= Godefroy Calès =

French physician and politician

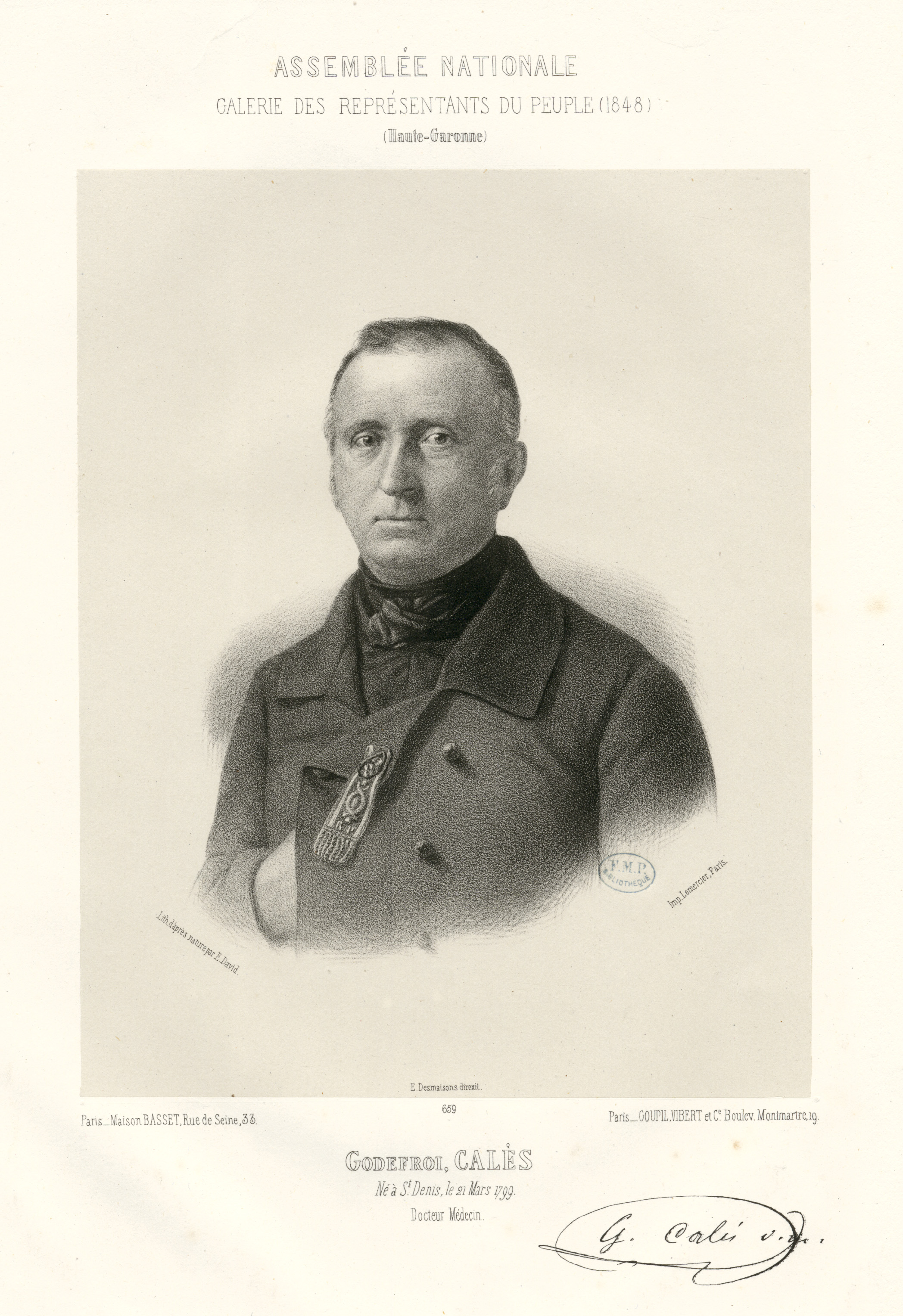
- Godefroy Calès (lithography by E. David from the collections of the BIU Santé)

Deputy in the National Constituent Assembly of Haute-Garonne
- In office 23 April 1848 – 26 May 1849

Personal details
- Born: 21 March 1799 Franciade, Seine, French First Republic
- Died: 25 July 1868 (aged 69) Villefranche-de-Lauragais, Haute-Garonne, Second French Empire
- Party: Left wing (The Mountain)
- Profession: Physician

Jean Marie Noël Godefroy Calès (French pronunciation: [ɡɔd.fʁwa ka.lɛs]) was a French physician and politician. He was born on 21 March 1799 in Franciade, Seine and died on 25 July 1868 in Villefranche-de-Lauragais, Haute-Garonne.

== Biography ==
Godefroy Calès was born on 21 March 1799 in Franciade in a family from Occitania with a republican tradition. His father, Jean Calès (born in Caraman on 8 November 1764, deceased in Mazamet on 11 October 1840 and married to Marianne Louise Victorine Fournier, deceased on 9 February 1744 in Villefranche-de-Lauragais), was a physician and the administrator of the region Haute-Garonne between 1793 and 1794. He was later appointed, in 1799, chief physician of the military hospital of Franciade, then called hôpital militaire de Franciade and located after the revolution within the walls of the Abbey Church of St Denis, where his son Godefroy was born. He then filled, from 1800 to 1804, the functions of Inspector-General of Military Hospitals. Jean Calès was the brother of Jean-Marie Calès (1757–1834), the eldest, also physician and representative at the National Convention and at the Council of Five-Hundred, and of Jean-Chrysostôme Calès (1769–1853), colonel in Napoleon's Great Army, baron of the Empire and representative at the Chamber of Representatives. Their parents (Godefroy's grandparents), Jean Calès, who was an alderman of Caraman, and Jeanne Rochas, were landowners of the region of Lauragais near Toulouse, from old Protestant families rooted in the region and forced to convert to Catholicism after the revocation of the Edict of Nantes issued by King Louis XIV in 1685.

The younger brother of Godefroy, Louis Denis Godefroy Calès, (born in November 1800 in Etain, Meuse), medical student in Toulouse in 1821, then professor at Castres, was presented to the Faculty of Protestant Theology of Montauban (created in 1808 by Napoleon I) and the Protestant consistory named him, on 20 April 1832, pastor in Viane (Tarn) where he will officiate until June 1874.

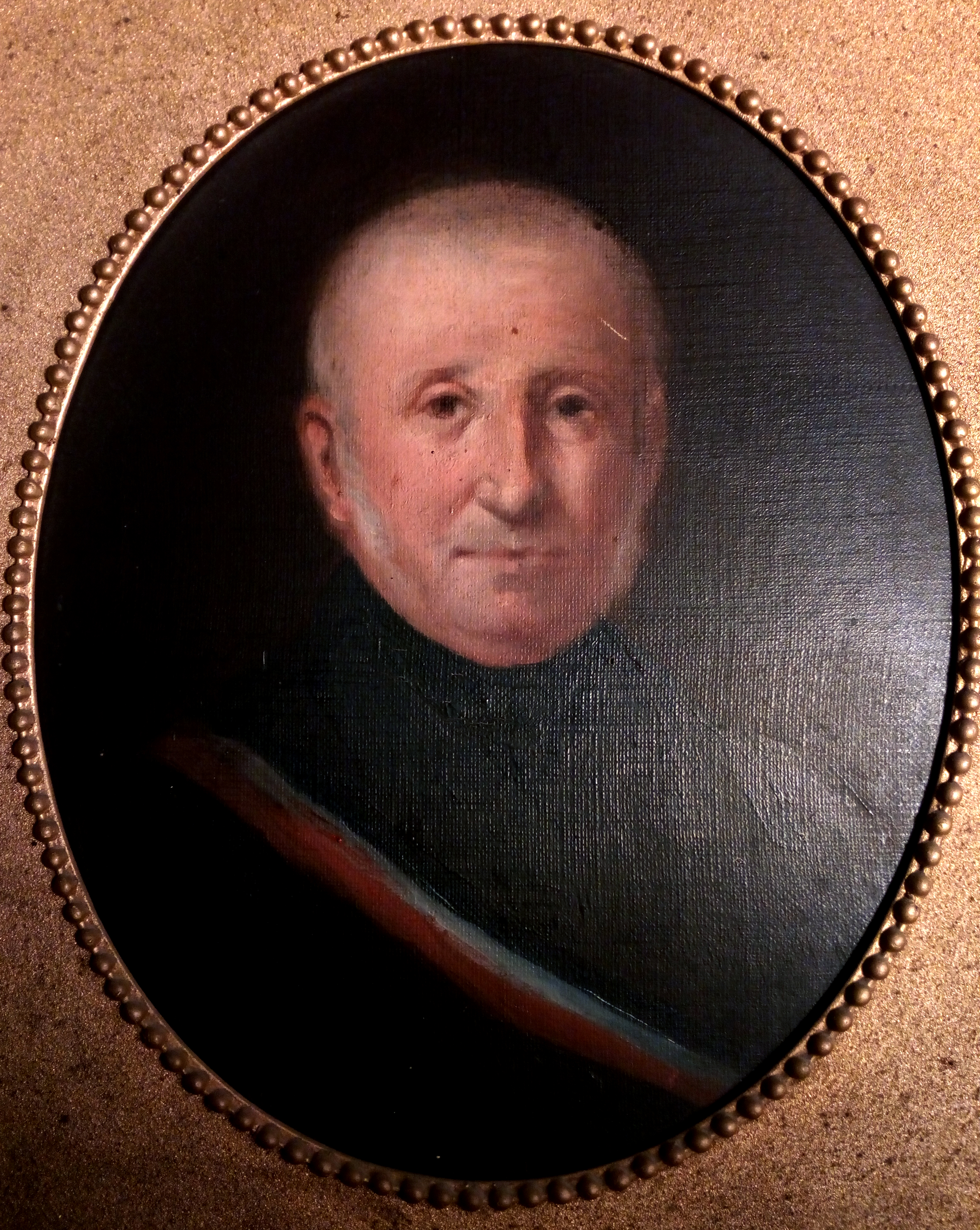
Godefroy Calès (oil painting, unattributed)

Faithful to family's traditions, Godefroy Calès followed, in Montpellier, the courses at the Faculty of Medicine and was received doctor in 1822. Established in Villefranche-de-Lauragais, where he had early acquired a certain political influence in republican circles, he was named after the Revolution of 1830 Commander of the National Guard; but seeing that the government was embarking on a course which was not his, he resigned. Godefroy remained close, intellectually and politically, to his uncle Jean-Marie, and this, despite the fact that the royalists condemned him to exile and banished him from the national territory in 1816, as a regicide, during the restoration of Monarchy. A letter written from Liège in 1833 by the former conventional and deputy to the Council of the Five-Hundred, and addressed to his nephew Godefroy, explicitly testifies about the proximity of their common republican convictions. Still remaining a member of the Municipal Council of Villefranche until 1848, Godefroy proclaimed that year, during the French second revolution, the Republic, and took over the administration of the city.

=== A pioneering doctor on the study of pellagra ===
Dr. Calès was one of the first doctors who identified pellagra in France, from 1822, in the Lauragais, alongside Doctors Jean Hameau (Landes) and Roussilhe (Aude). This disease, which has become rare in developed countries, is due to malnutrition and is manifested by dermatitis, diarrhea and, in the most severe cases, dementia. In the absence of treatment, the outcome is death. It reaches poor populations whose diet contains little tryptophan and Vitamin B3 (Niacin, Vitamin PP), as in the case of non-nixtamalized maize diets.

The observations and works of Calès made in Villefranche-de-Lauragais served as a foundation for the subsequent work of the doctor, philanthropist and politician Théophile Roussel (of the Academy of Medicine) who will contribute to publicize the disease in France, by the publication in 1845 of « De la pellagre », but especially by the second enlarged edition entitled « Traité de la pellagre et des pseudo-pellagres » published in 1866. The importance of Roussel is also to be found in his continuous action with health authorities to eradicate pellagra.

Thus, Roussel undertook a study trip to the South-West of France in 1847 and visited Dr. Calès in Villefranche to better understand this terrible plague. He will recognize in Calès the accuracy of his observations on the links of the disease with malnutrition, misery and deprivation, as well as with the maize crops of the region. He also saw in him a forerunner of the sanitary approaches against the impotence of therapeutic agents:

« I will limit myself to reproduce in this respect a page that wrote to me Mr. Calès in 1845. After the categorical confession of impotence [of the Therapeutic Agents, A.N.] which has been formulated above in terms so expressive: "I do not pretend, said the honorable doctor of Villefranche, that the therapeutic agents have no action; but, forced to accept our patients with their misery, we are confessing our failures. I have obtained satisfactory results only in those who have been placed under the influence of better hygiene" »

— Théophile Roussel

This sensitivity to the living conditions of the needy will underlie his future political action and his commitment to stand for the legislative elections of 23 April 1848.

=== A republican «fourtyeighter» deputy of the Mountain ===
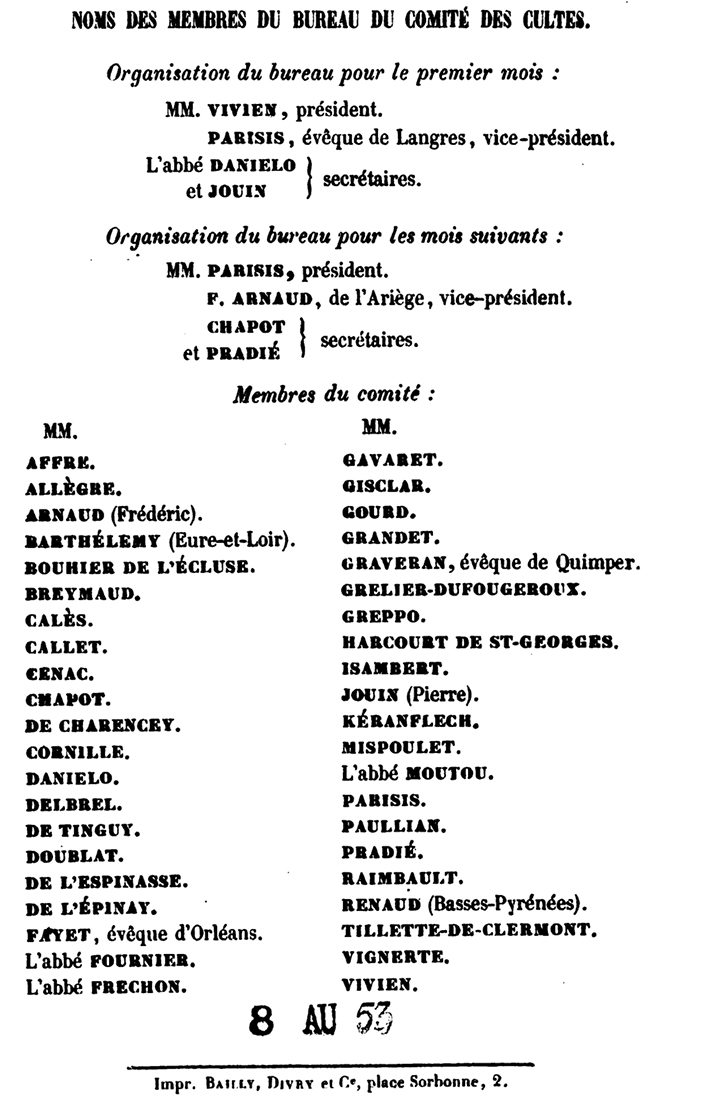
List of the members of the Committee of the Cults

Godefroy Calès was a very popular and advanced Republican militant in his département, and was elected on 23 April 1848, representative of Haute-Garonne at the Constituent National Assembly of the new Republic (Second Republic) declared after the Revolution of February 1848 and the overthrow of King Louis Philippe. These elections were the first to be held by universal suffrage since 1792.

Calès sat first, until 26 May 1849, in the « Committee of the Cults », a parliamentary committee of 42 members established to consider the question of a possible revision of the Concordat concluded with the Catholic Church in 1801, and consider the project of a complete Separation of the Churches and the State. The majority of the members of the committee, like a large part of the French, not wanting to reiterate the excesses of the revolution of 1789 in religious matters, and taking advantage of the climate of concord of the revolution of 1848, believed in the necessity and possibility of an agreement between Rome and the Republic, and wished to see negotiations open between Paris and the Holy See, to give the Concordat a new and more liberal foundation. They did not wish to see however the Concordat abrogated unilaterally. They also rejected the idea of a complete separation between the church and the state.

In the assembly, Calès sat with the extreme-left group of the Mountain (French: La Montagne, whose members sat on the highest benches of the Assembly), like his uncle Jean-Marie Calès half a century before (in 1792) at the National Convention. This group, in 1848, was led and organized by Alexandre Ledru-Rollin and comprising sixty-six deputies such as Pierre-Joseph Proudhon, Pierre Leroux, Victor Schœlcher or Félicité Robert de Lamennais, some of the pioneers of socialism in history. Calès attempted to defend the political achievements and the important social benefits obtained after the Revolution of February 1848 against the attacks of the moderate Republicans and of the party of Order (a political group formed by monarchists and conservatives, led by prominent members including Adolphe Thiers, Francois Guizot, Odilon Barrot, and Alexis de Tocqueville), who were the majority in the assembly. Thus, Calès violently opposed the reactionary policy of the Assembly and voted constantly with the montagnarde left and often with the associated independent extreme left (in particular with deputies such as Étienne Arago, Victor Considerant et Edgar Quinet).

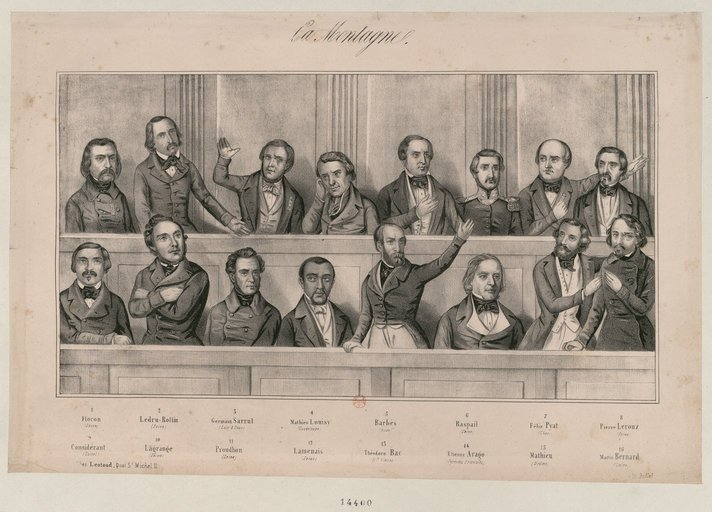
Collective Portrait of 16 Representatives of "the Mountain" at their banks of the Assembly over 2 ranks. (Buffet. Lithograph. Engraving in revue "La Montagne", Léotaud, publisher, quai Saint-Michel, 11. From up left to right: Considerant, Lagrange, Proudhon, Lammenais, Bac, Arago, de la Drôme, Bernard. From bottom left to right: Flocon, Ledru Rollin, Sarrut, Mathieu, Barbès, Raspail, Pyat, Leroux)

He maintained a relationship of friendship with the latter (famous writer, philosopher, poet, historian, professor at the Collège de France and republican politician), which continued later with his son Jean Jules Godefroy Calès. Edgar Quinet and his wife, Hermione Ghikère Asaky, frequently visited the Calès in the family home of Villefranche-de-Lauragais and maintained an epistolary relationship. Madame Quinet wrote later:

« It is a family adored in the country, respected by its opponents: since 89, leaders of the Lauragais democracy from father to son. From the Conventional [Jean-Marie Calès], to the representative of the Constituent Assembly [Godefroy Calès], all republicans, men of heart. Jules Calès, our friend, is indeed the worthy son of a worthy father »

— Madame Edgar Quinet

=== His parliamentary work ===
Supporter of the freedom of expression, Calès was opposing any restrictive law on the press, such as that on the restoration of the deposits for the newspapers. However, on 9–11 August 1848, the Assembly voted the extension of press offenses, the aggravation of penalties and the increase of the deposits.

Calès had been constantly interested in the social question which was progressively rising in France since the beginning of the 19th century. He therefore supported the uprising of May and June 1848. Thus, when on 26 August 1848, the Assembly proposed the prosecution of the former member of the Provisional Government Louis Blanc and the former prefect of police Marc Caussidière, who had been accused of having participated to the uprising, Calès strongly opposed the project. Prosecutions will be finally voted by the conservative majority and maintained. Blanc and Caussidière were forced to flee on exile.

On 1 September 1848, he also opposed the project of the restoration of the « contrainte par corps » (imprisonment for debt, in criminal matters), previously suppressed by the Provisional Government. It will be finally restored by the assembly, even if slightly softened.

As humanist, Goderoy Calès was a fervent supporter of a total abolition of the death penalty. Its partial abolition (for political offenses) had been initially decreed by the Provisional Government in February 1848, at the initiative of one of its member, the famous poet Alphonse de Lamartine. A project to extend the partial abolition to a total abolition was then debated at the National Assembly on 16 September 1848. The main abolitionist speaker was the famous writer and poet Victor Hugo. However, Calès and Hugo will finally not succeed in convincing their colleagues: the project will be rejected (and abandoned until 1981).

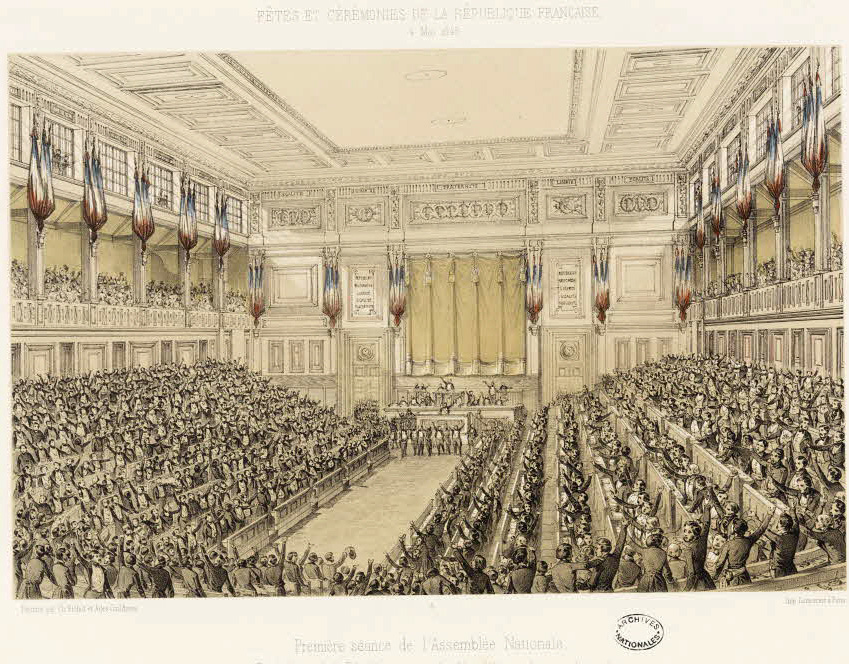
Celebrations and ceremonies of the French Republic. 4 May 1848. (First session of the National Assembly. Proclamation of the united and indivisible Republic by the people's representatives. Drawing by Ch. Fichot and Jules Gaildreau, national archives.)

Like his uncle Jean-Marie Calès, Godefroy was advocating a system of « representative » Republic against any possible form of republican « absolutism », founded both on a strong legislative and parliamentary power, and on a non-personalised and limited executive power. Thus, on 6 October 1848, Godefroy Calès defended the Grevy amendment, which proposed that « The National Assembly delegates the executive power to a citizen, who takes the title of president of the council of ministers, elected for a limited time, and always revocable ». Indeed, through this amendment, the young republican Jules Grevy wanted to oppose the project of an election of the President of the Republic by universal suffrage, and proposed instead to obtain the election of a president of the executive, who will be always revocable by the National Assembly, thus refusing to legitimize the power to one single person above everything: however, following Lamartine's recommendation, the majority of the deputies rejected the amendment. The date of the presidential election was thus set for 10 December 1848.

On 2 November 1848, still supporting social progress in society, Calès voted in favor of the Right to labor, defended at the speaker's tribune by Ledru-Rollin. Nevertheless, the final formula of the compromise, due to Lamartine, obliged the Republic to provide work for the needy « within the limits of its resources ».

On 25 November 1848, he voted against the parliamentary decree: « The General Cavaignac has well deserved from the Homeland ». Being accused of having allowed the June insurrection to flourish, and before violently crushing it, sacrificing thousands of National Guards, General Cavaignac gave explanations at the occasion of a public debate, which took place at the Assembly on 25 November. The debate turned to his advantage, and the Assembly almost unanimously confirmed the previous decree of 28 June 1848. Godefroy Calès, together with Victor Hugo, was one of the only thirty-four representatives who voted against.

Among other social measures debated in public at the parliament, Calès voted on 27 December 1848, in favor of the abolition of the tax on salt (against Government's recommendation), which was solicited by representatives of rural regions; on 2 May 1849, for the amnesty of the transported, and on 18 May 1849, for the abolition of the tax on beverages.

On 16 April 1849, Calès voted against the credits allocated to the Expedition of Rome and to sending an expeditionary force commanded by General Oudinot. The expedition was nevertheless voted by the National Assembly to initially provide aid to the Roman republicans, insurgent against the pretensions of Pope Pius IX expelled from Rome and against the Austrian domination. It was accompanied by the vote of a 1,200,000 francs loan, for the expenses of the first three months of the operation, to which the Socialists led by Ledru-Rollin opposed. Calès unsuccessfully signed the request for indictment of the President of the Republic Louis-Napoléon Bonaparte – the future emperor Napoleon III – and of the ministers guilty of violating the constitution: in the following weeks, the French troops will finally receive the order of the Prince-President and Odilon Barrot to crush the Roman Revolution led by the republicans Giuseppe Mazzini and General Garibaldi.

=== Towards the dissolution of the Constituent assembly ===
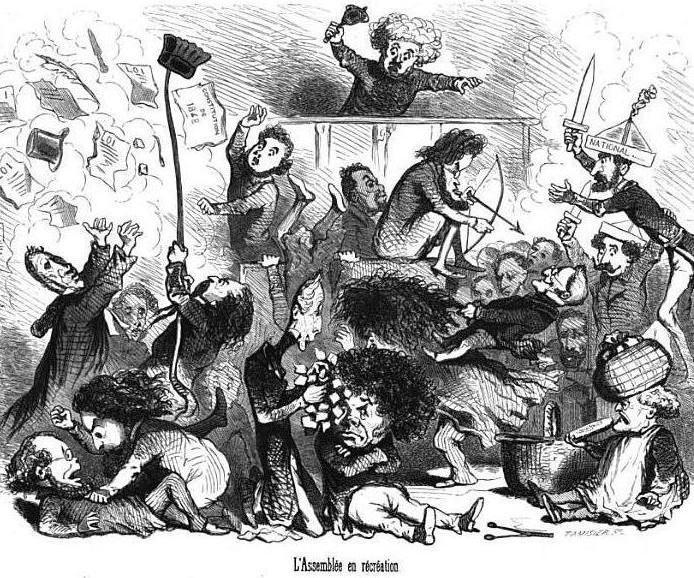
L'Assemblée en récréation. (Caricature by Cham representing the Constituent National Assembly (1850). Proudhon (bottom-left), Lamartine (on his knees, bottom-center), Crémieux (next to Lamartine, bottom-center), Considerant (next to Lamartine, holding a stick, center-left), Thiers (center-right), general Cavaignac (upper-right, with a newspaper hat), Ledru-Rollin (upper-left, facing the explosion of the Laws & Constitution)... are represented.)

Godefroy Calès vividly opposed the Rateau proposal: after the election of Louis-Napoleon Bonaparte as President of the Republic on 11 December 1848, and the nomination of the conservative cabinet Odilon Barrot on le 20 December 1848, the party of Order wanted to take advantage of its state of grace and to get rid as quickly as possible of the republican representatives who were opposing the right-wing government. He thus called for the rapid dissolution of the Constituent National Assembly of 1848 before the term of its legislature, and the election of a new Legislative Assembly. Supported by the government, the « Rateau proposal » was opposed by many representatives, from the deputies of the Mountain to some moderate republicans like Alphonse de Lamartine, Adolphe Billault or Jules Grévy, who felt that the task of the Constituent Assembly was not over. Vigorously discussed on 12 January 1849, Godefroy Calès and the Left couldn't prevent its adoption on 29 January.

Thus, on 26 May 1849, the Constituent National Assembly held its final seance. Godefroy Calès did not belong to the newly elected Legislative National Assembly of 1849, nor to other Assemblies. He came back to his region of Villefranche-de-Lauragais to resume his activity of physician, until his death on 25 July 1868, at the age of 69.

He was married to madame Zulmée Calès (born Léonie Alphonsine Zulmée Metgé), with whom he got a son on 24 July 1828, Jean Jules Godefroy, who will also become a physician, and will be elected Mayor of Villefranche-de-Lauragais in 1875, and Deputy of Haute-Garonne in 1885, under the Third Republic.

== Genealogy ==
Godefroy Calès is:

- the nephew of Jean-Marie Calès (1757–1834), regicide and deputy at the National Convention (1792–1795) and at the Council of Five Hundred (1795–1798).
- the nephew of Jean-Chrysostôme Calès (1769–1853), colonel of the Great Army and baron of the Empire. He has also been elected representative of the ephemeral Chamber of Representatives created by Napoleon during the period of the Hundred Days in 1815.
- the father of Jean Jules Godefroy Calès (1828–1889), deputy at the Chamber of Deputies (Third Republic) (1885–1889).

== Hommage ==
- The name of Godefroy Calès resurfaced in the 1930s during the apogee of the Radical Party in France. In search of an affirmation of his identity on the Left, the figure of Calès will be singularly commemorated in an article of the « Le Radical », the press organ of the party, on 11 May 1930.

== Annexes ==
=== Bibliography ===
- « Godefroy Calès », in Robert et Cougny, Dictionnaire des parlementaires français, 1889
- « Godefroy Calès » Biography on the website of the French National Assembly: http://www2.assemblee-nationale.fr/sycomore/fiche/%28num_dept%29/9795
- « Godefroi Calès » in « Biographie nationale des contemporains rédigée par une société de gens de lettres » (National biography of contemporaries written by a society of men of letters), under the direction of Mr. Ernest Glaeser, Editors: Glaeser and Co., Paris (1878). p. 85. Public domain. Identifier: ark: / 12148 / bpt6k5861239f. Source: National Library of France, Digital Collections Department, 2008-232271. Available in French on Gallica's website: http://gallica.bnf.fr/ark:/12148/bpt6k5861239f/f91.item.r=Cales
- « Godefroi Calès » in the « Dictionnaire universel des contemporains contenant toutes les personnes notables de la France et des pays étrangers » (Universal dictionary of contemporaries containing all the notable people of France and of foreign countries) by Louis-Gustave Vapereau. Bookshop of L.Hachette et Cie, Paris (1858). p. 323. Public domain. Available on Archive.org: https://archive.org/details/bub_gb_Dck5AAAAcAAJ
- « Godefroy Calès » in « La Grande Encyclopédie, inventaire raisonné des sciences, des lettres, et des arts » (La Grande Encyclopédie – The great encyclopedia: reasoned inventory of sciences, letters and arts) (Volume 8, p. 912), by a society of scholars and literary people; under the dir. of MM. Marcellin Berthelot,...Ferdinand-Camille Dreyfus et al. Publisher: H. Lamirault (Paris) then Société anonyme of "La Grande encyclopédie" (Paris) (1885–1902) Contributor: Dreyfus, Camille (1851–1905). Identifier: ark:/12148/bpt6k246438. Source: National Library of France. Available in French on the website of Gallica.fr: http://gallica.bnf.fr/ark:/12148/bpt6k246438.image.langFR.f3.pagination
- « Traité de la pellagre et des pseudo-pellagres » (Treatise on pellagra and pseudo-pellagres, "Work crowned by the Institute of France, Academy of Sciences, meeting of February 6, 1865"), by Théophile Roussel, ed. JB Baillière and son; 1866. Public domain. In French. Read on the Archive.org website: https://archive.org/stream/traitdelapella00rous#page/424/mode/2up
