= Jean-Marie Calès =

French politician (1757–1834)

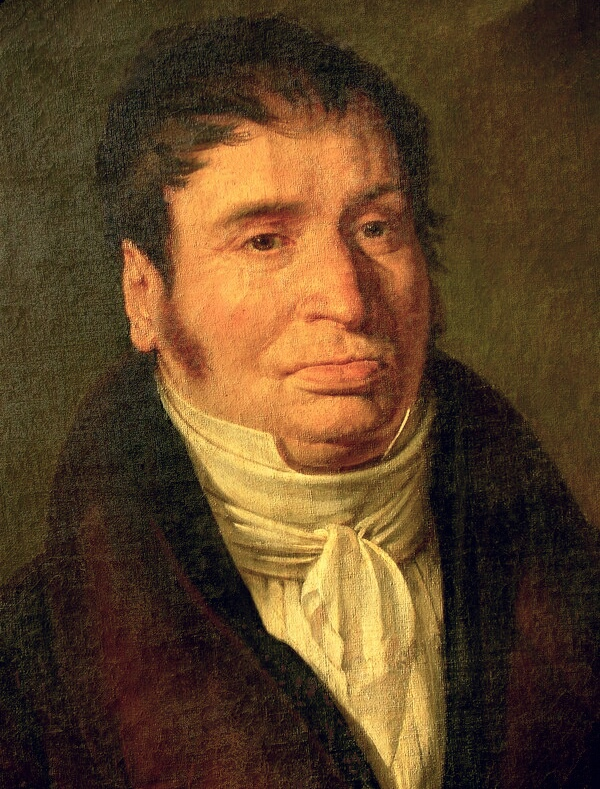

Deputy in the National Convention for Haute-Garonne
- In office 6 September 1792 – 26 October 1795
- Parliamentary group: Left-wing (The Mountain)

Deputy in the Council of Five Hundred for Haute-Garonne
- In office 15 October 1795 – 20 May 1798

Member of the Committee of General Security
- In office 5 March 1795 – 26 October 1795

Personal details
- Born: 13 October 1757 Cessales, Haute-Garonne; Kingdom of France
- Died: 13 April 1834 (aged 76) Liège; Kingdom of Belgium
- Profession: Physician

Jean-Marie Calès (French pronunciation: [ʒɑ̃maʁi kalɛs]; 13 October 1757 – 13 April 1834) was a French medical doctor and left-wing politician amid the French Revolution. He was born in Cessales, Haute-Garonne and died in Liège, Belgium.

== Biography ==
Jean-Marie Calès was a deputy of Haute-Garonne at the two first republican assemblies in French history, the National Convention from 1792 to 1795 and the Council of Five Hundred from 1795 to 1798, and a member as well of the Committee of General Security in 1795. He was also appointed Representative on mission by the Convention between 1793 and 1795 and sent to the départements of Ardennes, of Côte D'Or and of Doubs. He retired from political life in 1798, before being banned from the French territory as regicide under the Restoration of monarchy in 1816.

Although having voted for the death of King Louis XVI, the representative of the Mountain Calès was however a moderate revolutionary. Nourished by the renovating ideas characterizing the pre-revolutionary Age of Enlightenment, he did not support any of the radical measures taken during the Reign of Terror and even pronounced himself against Robespierre during the events of the 9 Thermidor. His parliamentary activity was particularly characterized by his reforming vision of society and of the institutions, which was particularly reflected in his innovative proposals on the future constitutions (Constitution of Year I and Constitution of Year III), on public education and on the place of women in the new society. As a Representative on mission, he was also very effective in the administrative work of organization, logistics, law enforcement and industrial development in the regions. Until his last hours, he never betrayed his republican and humanist ideals and maintained a constant hostility towards the scornful nobility and the obscurantist clergy, as well as a fine understanding of the difficulties of the people. His republican heritage will be preserved throughout the whole 19th century in Haute-Garonne through the political work of his nephew Godefroy Calès, then of his grand-nephew Jean-Jules-Godefroy Calès, both Republicans representatives at the National Assemblies of 1848 and from 1885.

He married, in October 1793, Marie-Sylphide Anne Poupardin (widow of Gabriel-Étienne Poupardin du Rivage d'Orléans), born Chardron, in Sedan in 1768 and deceased in 1828 in Liège, in exile alongside her husband Calès, with whom she had no children.

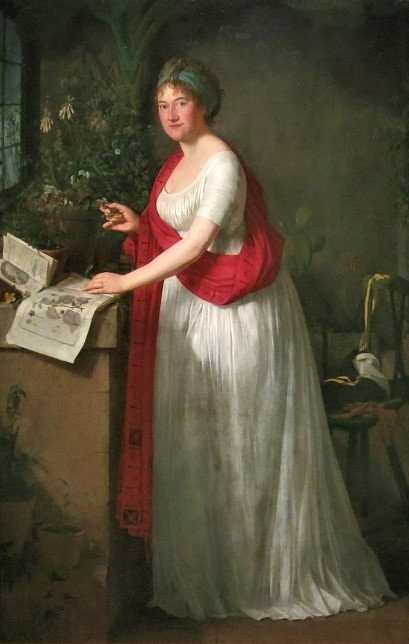
Portrait of Marie-Sylphide Calès by Julie Philipault, musée des Beaux-Arts d'Orléans

Calès died also in Liège in exile, six years later, on 13 April 1834, at the age of 76.

=== Youth ===
Jean-Marie Calès, « son of Jean Calès, alderman of Caraman, and of damsel Jeanne Rochas » was born on 13 October 1757 in Cessales, a small village in the region of Lauragais near Toulouse. Jean-Marie was the eldest son of 10 siblings, and had two sisters and seven younger brothers. Several of his siblings were also prominent, including the second oldest brother, Jean Calès (1764–1840), who became Inspector-General of military hospitals, Jean-Chrysostôme Calès (1769–1853), the fourth oldest, who became colonel in the Great Army and baron of the 1st Empire (and also representative at the ephemeral Chamber of Representatives created by Napoleon during the period of the Hundred Days in 1815), and Jean Joseph Etienne Victorin Calès (1772–1853), the fifth oldest, who became a military officer. Their parents were landowners of Lauragais, from old Protestant families rooted in the region and forced to convert to Catholicism after the revocation of the Edict of Nantes issued by King Louis XIV in 1685.

On the death of his father in 1785, Jean-Marie enrolled at the Faculty of Medicine of the University of Toulouse. As a doctor, he settled down and practiced medicine in the small town of Revel (Haute-Garonne). He quickly became one of the correspondents of the Academy of Arras and wrote an « Art of Healing ». He became at that time a fervent supporter of the Revolution, and was charged with performing administrative duties, including that of Procureur-syndic (magistrate who appeared during the French Revolution) of Revel, before being elected, on 9 September 1791, Administrator of the department of Haute-Garonne. But he refused this last position and, in his place, the electors chose his younger brother Jean Calès (1764–1840). Jean-Marie was also a member of the Society of the Friends of the Constitution (commonly known as the Jacobin Club) of Revel between 1791 and 1792.

=== Under the National Convention ===
==== Installation of the Republic ====
Jean-Marie Calès ran in the legislative elections of 6 September 1792 and was elected deputy at the National Convention by the department of Haute-Garonne. At the age of 34, he was the youngest of the 12 elected representatives of the departement. These legislative elections, the first experience of universal suffrage in French History, were held in an extremely tense national context, less than a month only after the Insurrection of 10 August 1792 (attack and take of the Royal Palace of the Tuileries by the armed Parisians, or the «Second Revolution») and under the imminent threat of the Austrian and Prussian troops led by the Duke of Brunswick-Wolfenbüttel, which were marching on Paris to «free» King Louis XVI (who had been arrested and suspended during the journée of August 10), and to restore the absolute monarchy.

During its first session held in the Salle du Manège (the indoor riding academy hall, seat of deliberations during most of the French Revolution since 1789) on 21 September 1792 (the day following the victory of the French troops at the battle of Valmy), the National Convention proclaimed the Abolition of Royalty. The next day, 22 September 1792, it proclaimed the French First Republic by decree. Hence from this day, all public bills will be dated from « Year I » of the Republic.

Calès joined the political group of the « Mountain » (French: La Montagne, whose members sat on the highest benches of the Assembly), which was considered as the most radical group of the assembly and was led by personalities such as Georges Danton, Jean-Paul Marat, and Maximilien Robespierre. This group was notably opposing the group of the Girondist representatives.

==== Trials of King Louis XVI and Queen Marie-Antoinette ====
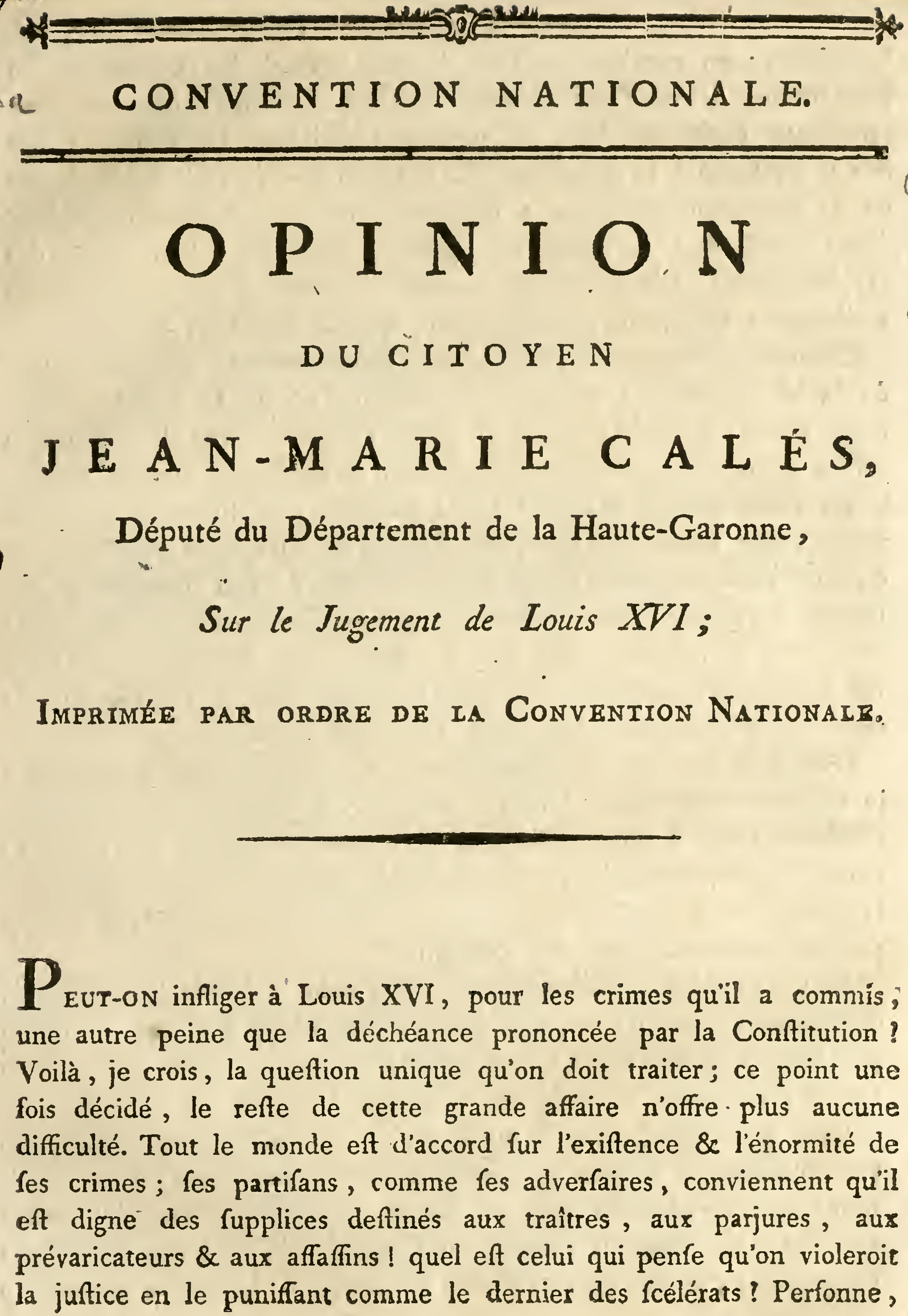
Opinion of the citizen Jean-Marie Calès, deputy of the department of Haute-Garonne, on the judgment of Louis XVI. Printed by order of the National Convention (1792)

When the Convention organised the Trial of Louis XVI, held between 10 and 26 December 1792, Calès published his « Opinion on the judgment of the king », and then voted on 15 January 1793 « yes » to the immediate Death of the King, without suspension nor ratification by the people. He notably declared solemnly to the Assembly: I vote for death, and all my regret is not to have to pronounce on all the tyrants. This vote of Calès will be later reported in « Ninety-Three », the last novel written by Victor Hugo:

« People pointed out the corner where the seven representatives of the Haute-Garonne sat, elbow to elbow; the first called to pronounce their verdict on Louis XVI, they replied one after another: Mailhe: death. – Delmas: death. – Projean: death. – Calès: death. – Ayral: death. – Julien: death. – Desaby: death. »

— Victor Hugo, « Ninety-Three » (1874)

The king will be sentenced to death by an extremely narrow majority: 365 votes against 356, and then, after recounting the votes the next day: 361 against 360. He would be guillotined a few days later, on 21 January 1793, on Revolution's Square.

Soon after (six months later), on 5 August 1793, Calès, then Representative on mission to the armies of the Ardennes (see below), will send a letter from the camp of Ivoy to the Convention to mark his adhesion to the decree which provided for the dismissal of Queen Marie-Antoinette before the Revolutionary Tribunal. He will speak in these terms:

« Citizens my colleagues, you have decreed that Marie-Antoinette would be sent to the revolutionary tribunal and I was unfortunate enough to be absent when you issued this decree. I ask you to receive my adhesion as a proof of my horror for tyrants and of my contempt for the threats of those who defend their cause. »

On 5 October 1793 the Convention will vote this decree, on the 14th, the hearings of the revolutionary tribunal led by the public prosecutor Fouquier-Tinville will begin: the sentence of death, for high treason, will be pronounced on 16 October 1793. Only a few hours later, Marie Antoinette would be guillotined, like her husband, on Revolution's Square.

Following the King's death, the National Assembly left the Salle du Manège and moved on 9 May 1793 to the neighbouring Tuileries Royal Palace. It settled into the Salle des Machines (Hall of the Machines), which was larger, more comfortable and more adequate to the parliamentary sessions, and where the Assembly will carry out the main part of its works (until its final and definitive transfer into the current Palais Bourbon on 21 January 1798).

==== Project of Constitution ====
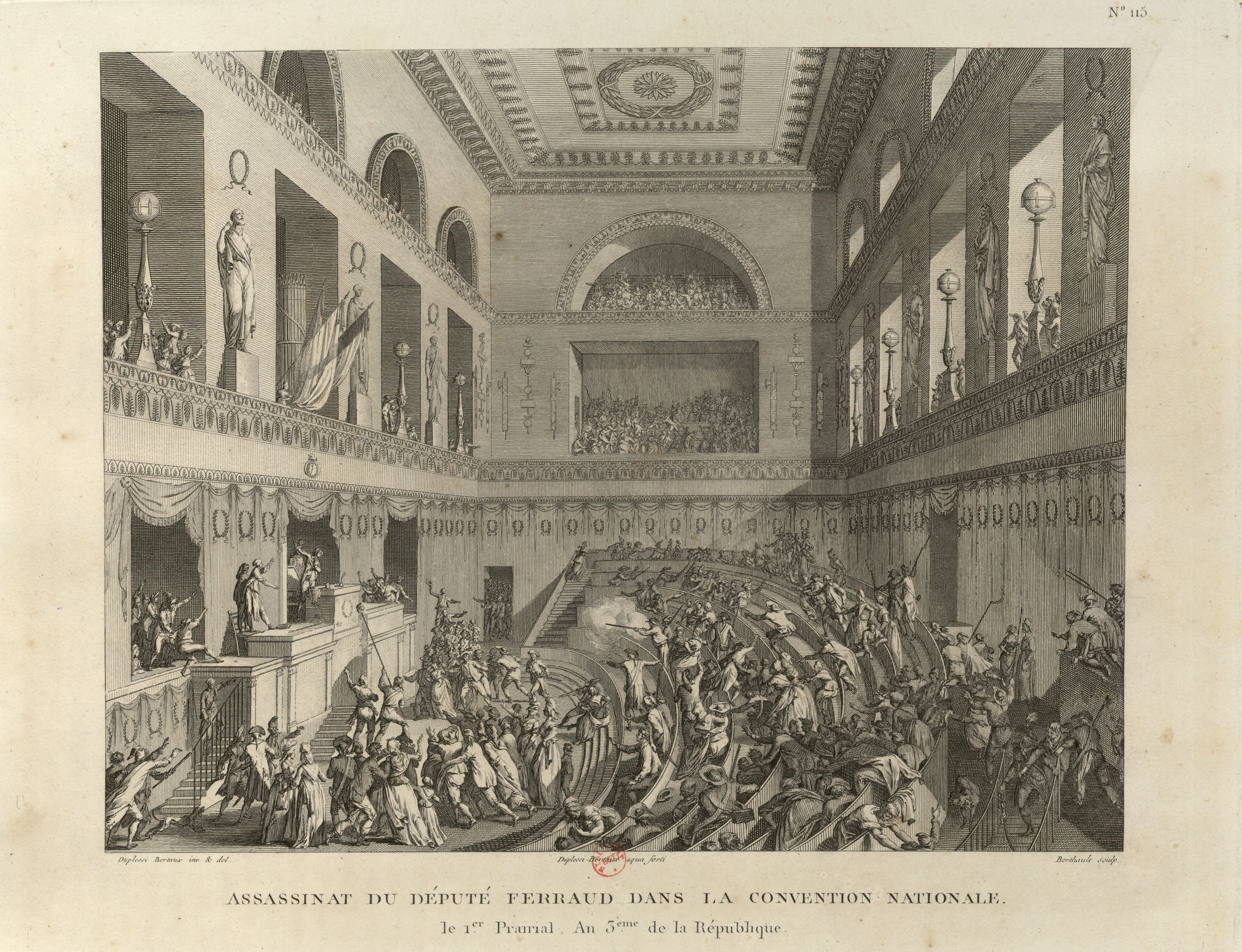
It was in the Salle des Machines of the Tuileries Royal Palace that the National Convention held the majority of its sessions from 9 May 1793 to 21 January 1798. Estampe by Jean Duplessis-Bertaux (between 1793 and 1803), Musée Carnavalet, Paris.

In the course of the same year, Calès was one of the fifty deputies who were commissioned to draft a project of constitution, concurrently with the one proposed by Condorcet on 15 and 16 February 1793 (Girondin constitutional project). He published two liberal booklets entitled: « Notes on the plan of Constitution » and « Continuation of the Notes ». Although he was a deputy of the mountain, Calès criticized the plan of constitution proposed by the Committee of Public Safety which consecrated the Rousseauist democratism of popular sovereignty (direct democracy) to the detriment of the principle of national sovereignty (representative democracy) inspired by Montesquieu, and then by Sieyès in 1789. Thus, the Committee's project, very democratic and decentralized, envisaged that the French people would be distributed, for the exercise of its sovereignty, in Primary Assemblies of cantons. The representative Calès recalled that « the people taken en masse, could not, in a large State, exercise by itself its right of legislation, nor handle the ship's wheel of the government » at the risk that « the whole of France would see its workshops, its agriculture and its trade abandoned, and the people would be continually assembled into deliberative assemblies ». Thus, he advocated the organization of a « representative republic », which should not be « absolute ».

Also, against the excesses of egalitarianism, he proposed a 'republic of merit', offering to establish four « degrees of honor » in the State: for the farmer, the warrior, the scholar and the artisan (« I would have liked these degrees of honor to be personal, and that the quality of being a French citizen made it the basis and the merit »). He also opposed making the right to insurrection a law of the Republic (« It is in nature, and you have no need to erect it fastidiously and unnecessarily into a law »). Finally, the liberal and tolerant Calès criticized several of the directive and uniformizing proposals of the Committee aimed at reinforcing the Unity of the social corps and of the nation:

« Indeed, the self-interest, the self-esteem, the inclinations of both sexes towards each other, the religious sentiments, that we can change, modify, but not destroy, these motives of the human heart, have counted for nothing in the calculations of the Committee ».

The Convention solemnly promulgated the Constitution of the Year I on 24 June 1793 (constitution of the 6 messidor year I, the "convention montagnarde"). It was ratified by referendum on 9 August, but was never implemented because of wartime. Indeed, only two months later, on 10 October 1793, the Convention decreed that its application was suspended indefinitely and « the government will be revolutionary until peace ». The Convention adopted a few years later the Constitution of the Year III (22 August 1795, which included in its preamble the Declaration of the Rights and Duties of Man and the Citizen of 1795), which was approved by plebiscite on 6 September 1795 and founded the new regime of the Directory (it established also the Census suffrage, and politically, provided for a two-house legislature: a Council of Five Hundred and a Council of Ancients, and a unique kind of executive: a five-member committee (Directory) chosen by the legislature).

==== Project on Public education ====
In the context of the revolutionary great's idea of the regeneration of man, and of woman in particular, Calès also published a project on public education, regarded as very progressive for the time, because it was concerning women:

« You will agree, Citizens, that all the projects which have been presented to you up to now are related only to a part of humanity, & that it seems that the most interesting class of society has not yet deserved to fix the attention of the legislator. Yes, always occupied with men, I never hear about women. »

These debates on the public school were at the time the opportunity for the conventionals to define the norms of the new femininity. Within this project influenced by the ideas of Condorcet, Calès developed his innovative proposals for the establishment of public education houses « differing from the old convents » in which no religion would be taught, for girls aged from eight to twelve or fifteen, « entrusted to citizens [women] known for their virtues, talents and love for the laws of the state ». There, they will receive an education « based on the eternal laws of reason and truth », they will learn to read, write, speak French, count and hold a household. Not yet free, this education would nevertheless be moderate and financed on the basis of income, including a maximum beyond which the State will bear the additional expenses.

Similarly, in July 1793, to remedy to the illiteracy in the army, Calès proposed that military rank advancement should no longer be simply determined by seniority of service criteria, but rather conditioned on reading and writing proficiency. « It is urgent to remedy this abuse by demanding that the individual should meet the required qualities ». A decree of 27 Pluviôse, Year II (12 February 1794) will state later that no citizen may be promoted, from the rank of corporal to that of general-in-chief, if he can not read and write.

As representative of the Convention, Calès actively participated to the foundation of many famous current institutions as the National Museum of Natural History (10 June 1793), the Ecole Polytechnique (28 September 1794), the National Conservatory of Arts and Crafts (10 October 1794), the Ecole Normale Supérieure (30 October 1794), the Metric system, the Music Conservatory of Paris, the Conservateur des hypothèques and the Special School of Oriental Languages (30 March 1795). The decree of 19 March 1793, also affirmed, together with the Right to work, the Right to assistance for every man who is unable to work (the public aid is a « sacred debt », Constitution of 1793). The law of Floreal, 22 Year II (11 May 1794) organized the public assistance in the countryside.

==== Representative on mission ====
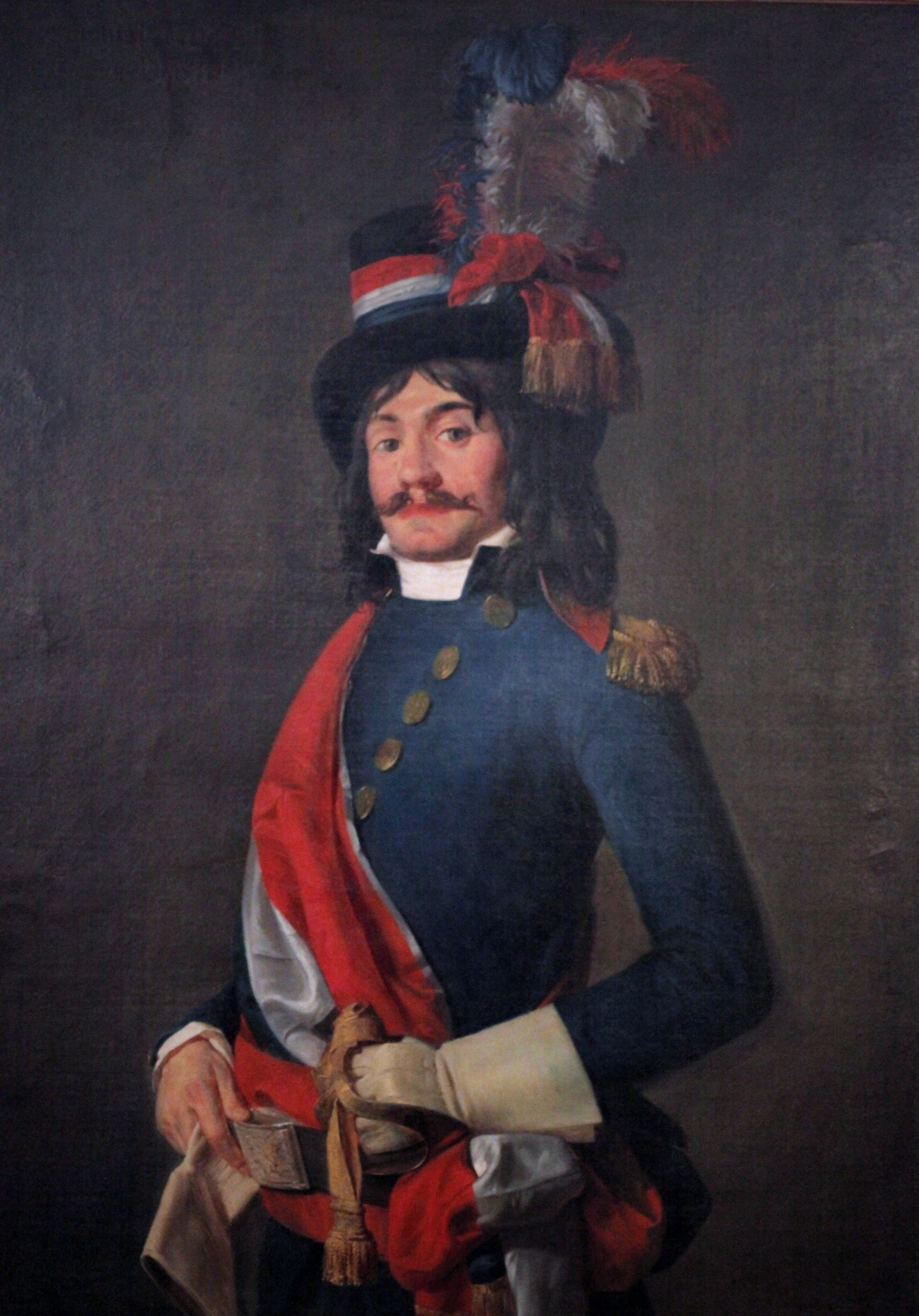
Portrait of a représentant en mission

On 15 June 1793 Calès was appointed as areprésentant en mission, an extraordinary envoy of the National Assembly for maintaining law and order in the départements and armies. He was sent several times between 1793 and 1795, notably in the Ardennes and the Marne (on 17 June 1793) to ensure the supply of military troops. During his mission, he delivered a resounding « Speech » at the Champ de Mars of Sedan on 10 August 1793, which was printed and placarded in that city. This speech began with these exalted words:

« What a spectacle for the universe! What a day for a man worthy of being free! What a moment for a heart that has long groaned under the chains of an unworthy slavery, sighing for the delights of liberty. »

He met then in this city his future wife Madame Marie-Sylphide Anne Poupardin (1768–1828), widow of the negociant Gabriel-Étienne Poupardin du Rivage d'Orléans. She belonged to a family of industrialists of Protestant origin, owned a manufacture in Sedan, which gave her a certain ease, and had two children. Calès married her in October 1793.

However, after four months of mission, on 19 October 1793, both Calès and his colleague Jean-Baptiste Perrin des Vosges were called back to Paris, because being considered as « too moderate ». In reality, this recall followed slanderous denunciations issued by members of the Popular Society of Sedan, as well as by the mayor of the city, Vassant, who accused them of having too much frequented the high society of Sedan (with as proof in support, the new wealthy wife of Calès). However, the two representatives were defended by the deputies of the Ardennes and by the general-council of the commune of Charleville, who demanded to the Convention (in a eulogistic address read during the session of 27 September 1793) that « the infamous calumniators of these deputies should be delivered to the Revolutionary Tribunal ». The accusations, thus, were not pursued. Calès and Perrin published then a « Report » of this mission, made to the Convention and printed.

==== Thermidorian Convention ====
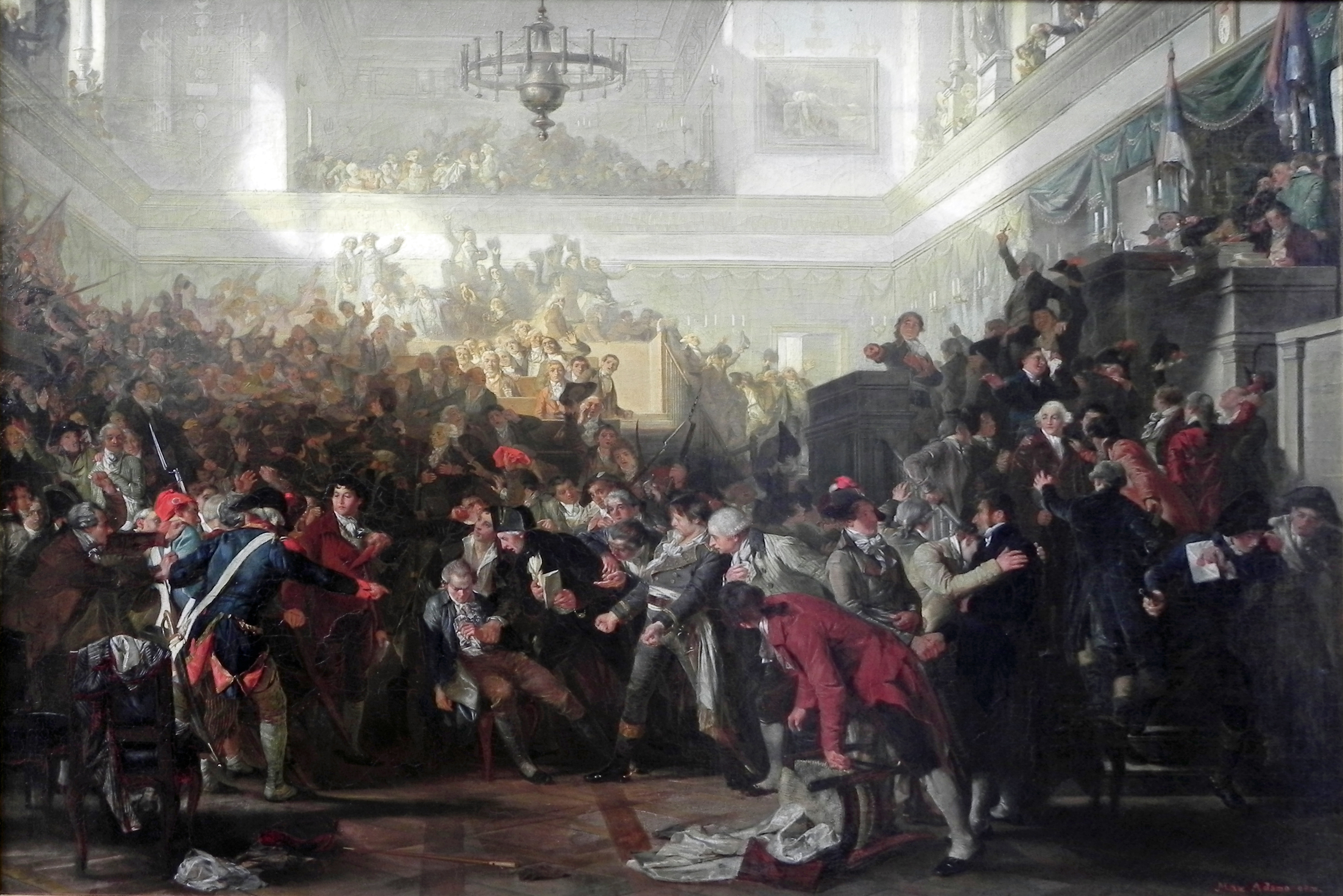
Robespierre overthrowed during a Session of the Convention nationale the 9 Thermidor Year II, painting by Max Adamo (1870), Alte Nationalgalerie, Berlin.

After returning to the Assembly, Calès did not support any of the sanguinary proposals of the Convention during the Reign of Terror, and remained silent until the events of the 9 Thermidor Year II (27 July 1794), which resulted in the fall of Robespierre and of the regime of Terror, thus opening the so-called period of the Thermidorian Convention. On the following 23 Thermidor (10 August 1794) was appointed member of a commission comprising twelve representatives who were charged to unseal the « Papers of Robespierre, Couthon, Saint-Just, Lebas ... and other accomplices of the conspiracy, to examine them, and to make a report to the National Convention ». Calès thus published, on 15 September 1794, a « List of names and addresses of individuals convinced or accused to have taken part in the conspiracy of the infamous Robespierre » which brought together 191 people from the entourage of Robespierre, who will all be later prosecuted. Because of his clear opposition to the « Incorruptible » and to the Reign of Terror, he received from the victorious party a new mission in the department of Côte d'Or on 9 October 1794.

In this mission, he developed much « prudence and firmness ». He succeeded, not without difficulty, in putting an end to the revolutionary excesses committed by the "terrorists" (supporters of the regime of the Terror) and closed the club of Dijon (Terror is no longer on the agenda! he said) which had asked the Convention on 7 Fructidor (24 August 1794) for the return of rigorous measures, as before under the Terror. Calès freed about 300 incarcerated prisoners, and the political purge was led in the opposite direction. All the local popular societies became prohibited and were dissolved. Conversely, he attempted to prevent the return of the royalists and other fanatic Catholics, who took advantage of the liberalism of the thermidorian reaction to install in turn a violent reign of white terror, by threatening by decree the nonjuring priests (« prêtres réfractaires », except married, sixty-year-old or invalid priests) that their bells would be broken, as well as their crosses and pedestals, and that the celebration of the cult would be forbidden. The National Convention, after having heard the glowing reports of the Committee of Public Safety (made by Boissy d'Anglas) and of the Committee of General Security which were both approving the « firm and energetic » conduct of Calès in the Côte d'Or, decreed the 5 nivôse year III (25 December 1794) that he will go immediately to Besançon, in the department of Doubs.

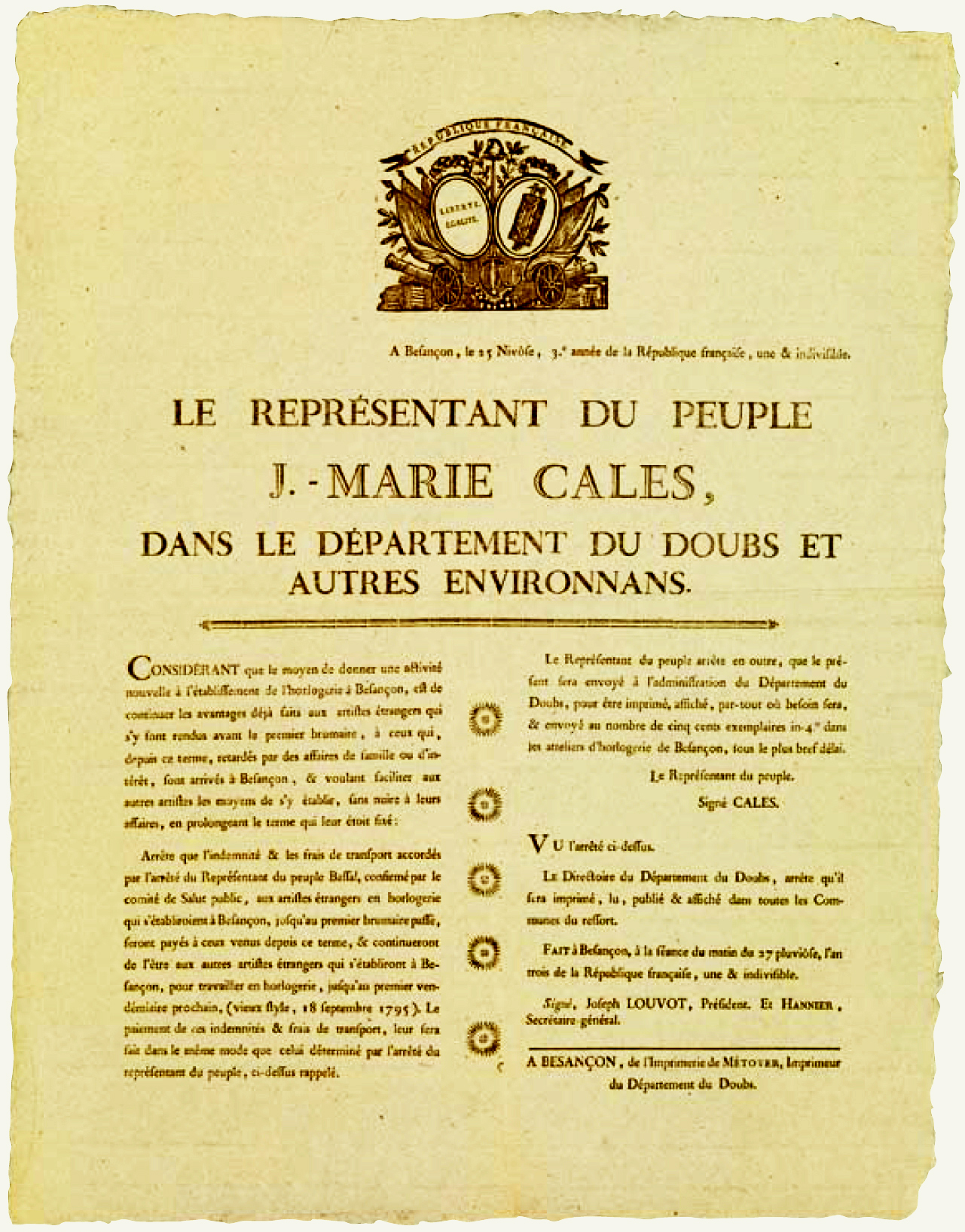
Decree issued by the Representative Calès (Besançon, Doubs) the 25 nivôse year III (14 January 1795).

Calès arrived in the Doubs at the beginning of the year 1795 to develop the local industry. He was authorized to take all measures necessary to promote the progress of the internationally renowned Watchmaking Manufacture of Besançon and to deliver it from the obstacles that were hindering its success. He was similarly charged to maintain in activity in the departments of the Doubs and other surrounding departments, the forges and furnaces that feed the foundries of cannon, iron and weapons manufactures. On 25 Nivôse Year III (14 January 1795), Calès published a decree, posted in all communes of the department, which encouraged Swiss watchmakers to settle in Besançon. This decree was extending that of 21 Brumaire Year II (11 November 1793) which granted the right of citizenship, an exemption from military service and housing facilities to Swiss immigrants, who came to found the watchmaking industrial hub of the franc-comtoise capital, and the French Watchmaking Manufacture of Besançon (founded by decree on 1 June 1794). Thus, thanks to these significant incitements initiated by Calès and by the French public authorities, from only 80 Swiss watchmakers arrived in Besançon in 1793, their number will reach the 1500 at the end of the 1st Empire, Besançon becoming at the end of the 19th century, and still nowadays, the French capital of watchmaking.

==== In the Committee of General Security ====
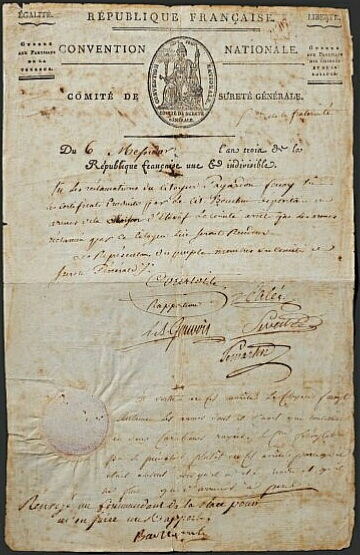
Decree issued by the Representative Calès, member of the Committee of General Security, contersigned by Buonaparte (6 Messidor year III (24 June 1795) in Paris).

Back in Paris, on Ventose, 15, year III (5 March 1795), Calès was elected member of the Committee of General Security, a committee previously designed to protect the Revolutionary Republic from its internal enemies. He was re-elected a second time on 2 August 1795. During the historic session of the Assembly on 14 Vendemiaire (6 October 1795), under the applause of his colleagues, Calès came to announce that he just had, at the head of the armed force, proceeded to the evacuation and closing of the hall where the electors of the "section of the Théâtre-Français" (one of the revolutionary sections of Paris whose illustrious former members were Danton, Desmoulins and Marat) were meeting to protest against the decrees of the Convention and to organize the royalist insurrection of the 13th Vendémiaire year IV (5 October 1795), which had started the day before. This coup against the Convention and the young Republic will be repressed in blood by the commander of the troops of Paris Paul Barras and the young general Napoléon Bonaparte.

Calès remained in the Committee until the Directory, when it was replaced by a Ministry of General Police (2 January 1796).

=== Under the Directory ===
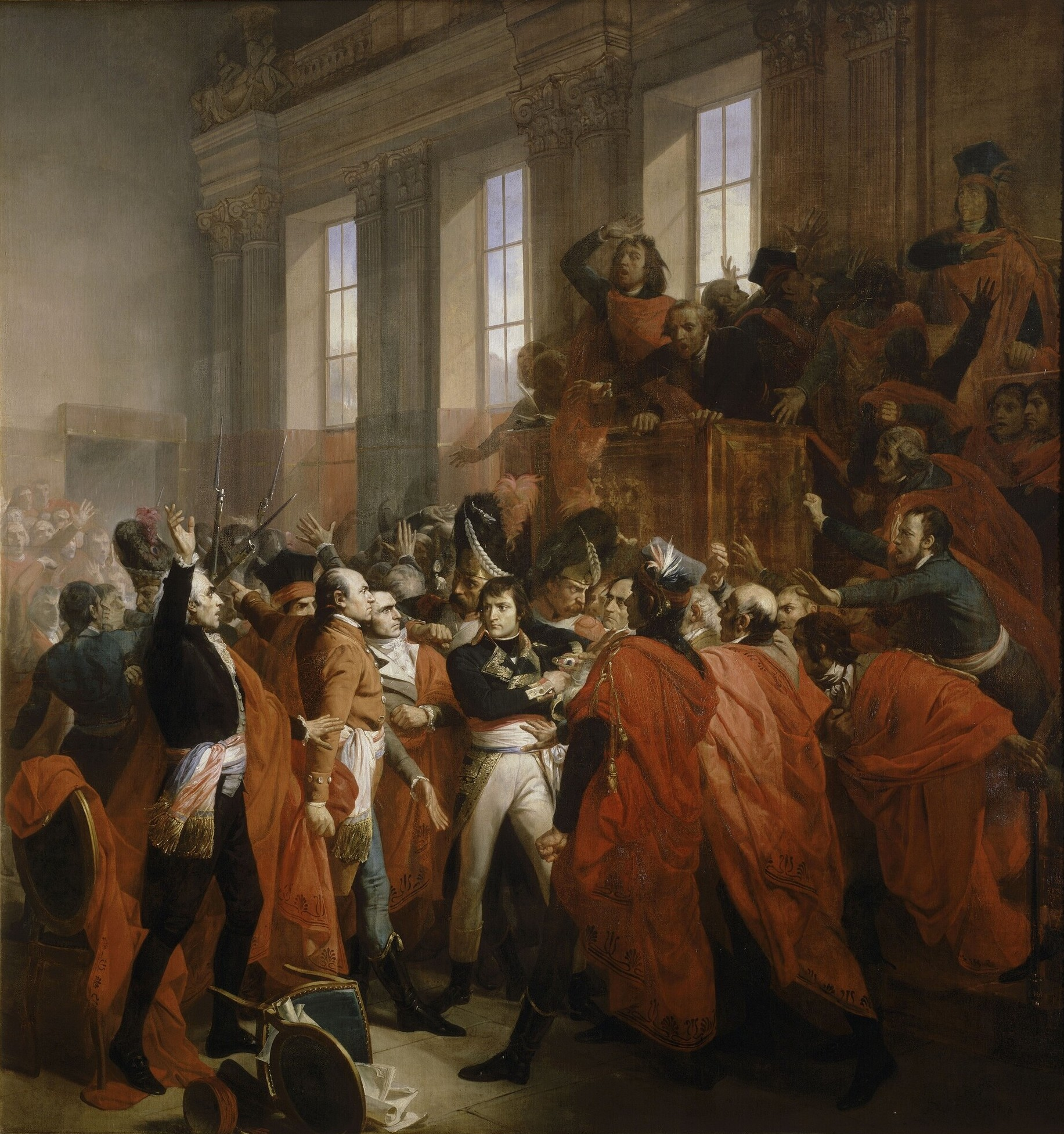
The deputies of the Council of Five Hundred (in red costume), a year after Calès left it on 20 May 1798. (General Bonaparte at the Council of Five Hundred — Coup d'État of the 18–19 brumaire Year VIII, by François Bouchot)

Calès was elected deputy of the Council of Five Hundred at the legislative elections of the 23rd Vendemiaire year IV (15 October 1795), according to a procedure whereby two-thirds of the seats were reserved to former deputies of the Convention (by virtue of the « decree of the two-thirds » previously adopted, to prevent the royalists from returning to power). These principles were previously established by the Constitution of the Year III, which was adopted by the Convention on 23 August 1795, and which inaugurated the new regime of the Directory. The Convention held its last session on Brumaire 4, year IV (26 October 1795) and closed with the prolonged cries of Long live the Republic! after having decreed an amnesty to all those punished for revolutionary crimes and pronounced the abolition of the death penalty from the day the general peace would be proclaimed.

The mandate of Calès was renewed on 20 Nivose year V (9 January 1797). He took part, in a militarily besieged Paris, in the Coup of 18 Fructidor year V (5 September 1797) led against the royalists who had become the majority in the Council of Five Hundred and the Council of Ancients, and actively contributed to the success of this day. The same day, the Chambers moved to the Odéon (Council of Five Hundred) and to the School of Medicine (Council of Ancients).

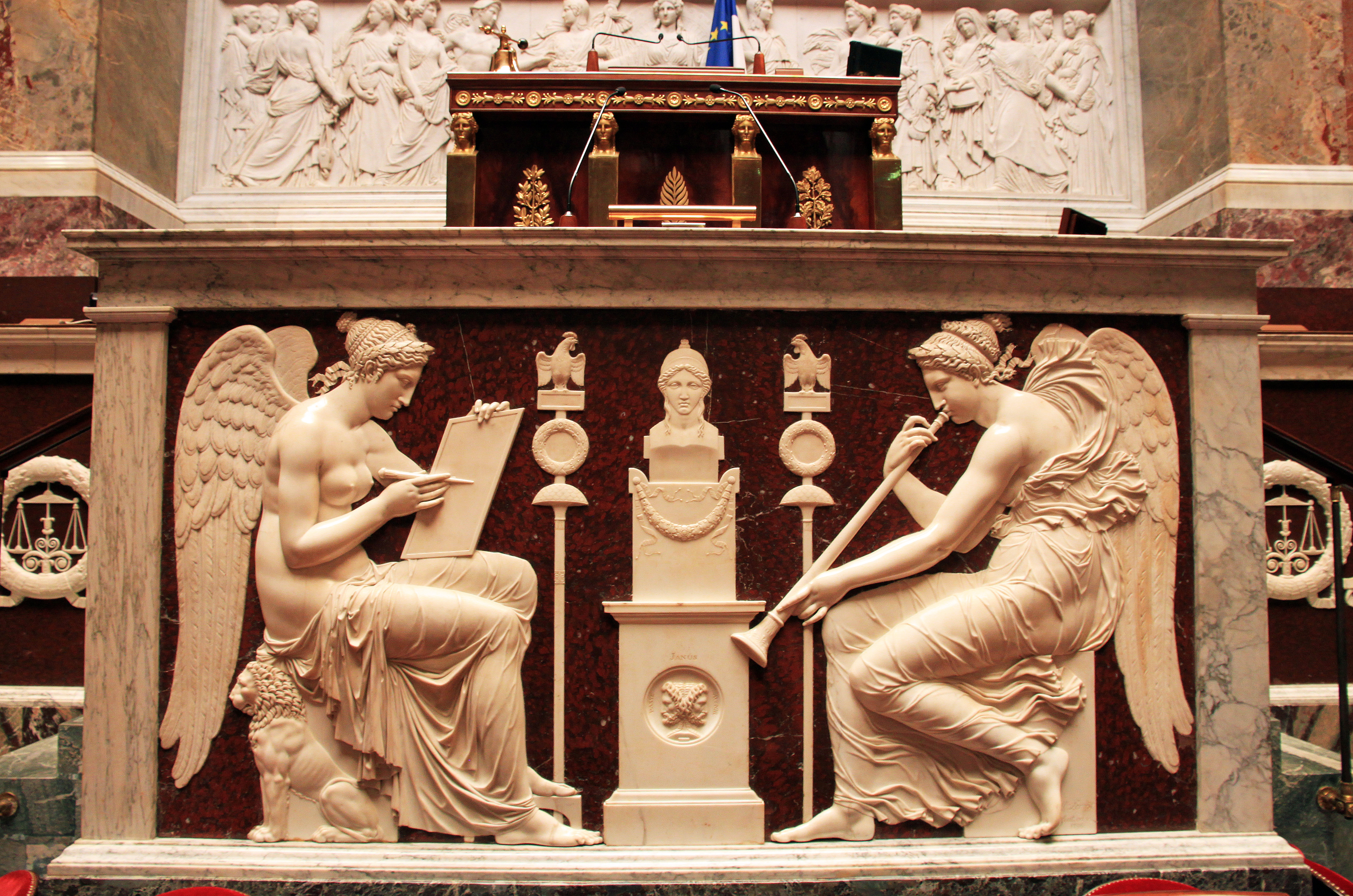
The Orator's Tribune of the French National Assembly (in today's hemicycle of Palais Bourbon) and its bas-relief sculpted by François-Frédéric Lemot in 1798, were ordered by Calès, then deputy and quaestor of the Council of Five Hundred.

He also made several reports to the Council (which were adopted), on the costume of the representatives, of the secretaries, of the messengers of State and of the ushers of the Legislative Body, on the establishment of health schools in Paris, Angers, Bruxelles and Montpellier (12 Brumaire, Year VI – 2 November 1797), on medical education (29 Germinal, Year VII – 18 April 1798), and on the organization of the Ecole Polytechnique (he requested that only « young men known for their civic virtue » should be admitted).

Finally, Calès was chosen and appointed by his peers « quaestor » of the assembly (member of a parliamentary assembly in charge of its internal administration, such as budgeting, personnel, premises, equipment, etc.). The first major work under the responsibility of Calès was the construction of the first hemicycle of the Palais Bourbon, which has now disappeared. The names of « Talot, Jacomin, Martinel, Laa and Calès » were engraved on a copper plate placed under the marble of the « orator's tribune » at the occasion of the installation of the Council of Five Hundred in its new palace on 21 January 1798. This tribune, whose bas-relief sculpted by François-Frédéric Lemot represents two allegories: « The History facing The Fame », still exists today and is still currently being used in today's French National Assembly.

=== Under the Empire and the Restoration ===
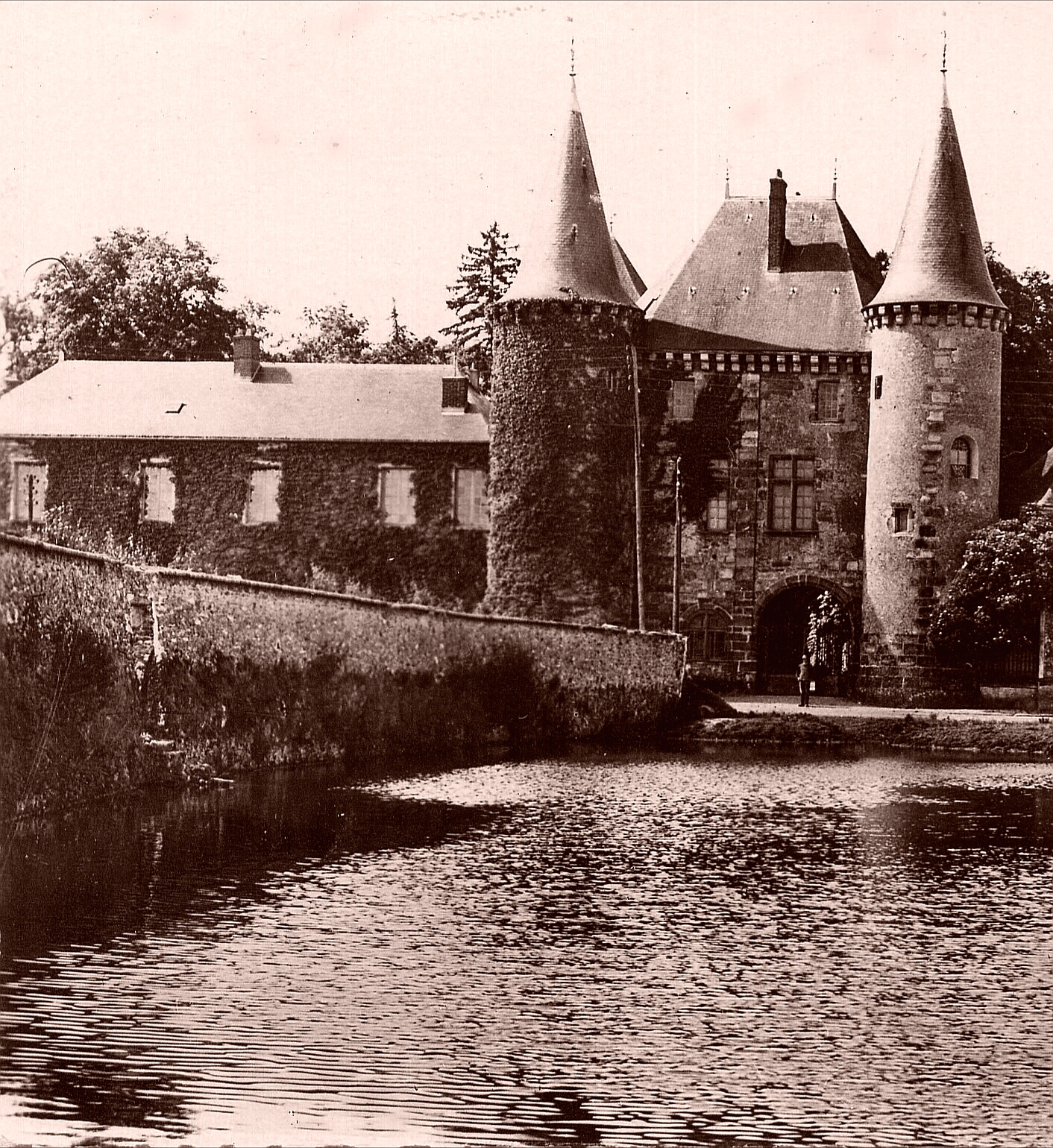
Residence of Jean-Marie Calès in les Bordes (Yvelines, France). Photography by Émile Mignon.

Calès retired from the parliament at the end of his mandate on 20 May 1798. He retired to his property, the château des Bordes, he had bought in 1796 as biens nationaux (properties confiscated during the French Revolution from the Catholic Church, the monarchy, émigrés, and suspected counter-revolutionaries for "the good of the nation"). This farm of a hundred hectares, which the descendants of the lord of Bonnelles owned under the Old Regime, is located in the commune of La Celle-les-Bordes, near Rambouillet and not far from Paris. He became mayor of the hamlet of les Bordes for a while, a breeder of purebred merinos – a sheep species rare at this time – and he also resumed the practice of medicine. He lived at les Bordes during the last hours of the Directory, and throughout the Consulate and the Empire, for about 18 years.

However, after the fall of Napoleon, under the Bourbon Restoration of Monarchy, Calès was condemned to exile as regicide and banished from the national territory by the « amnesty law of 12 January 1816 » proclaimed by king Louis XVIII. He had to hastily leave France with a passport for Germany issued by the Minister of Police. He and his wife took with them only a few belongings, including one book: the works of Hippocrates (Van der Linden edition, Leiden, 1665), which Calès gave to the doctor who treated his last illness.

After living in Munich (Germany) and in Basel (Switzerland), he took refuge in Liège (Belgium) with his wife and several other conventional regicides, including the former president of the Convention and deputy of Marne Thuriot de la Rozière, and the deputies of Ille-et-Vilaine Duval, of Lot-et-Garonne Paganel, of Haute-Garonne Mailhe, of Indre-et-Loire Ysabeau and of Oise Matthieu-Miranpal. He was helped for his settlement in the Belgian city by a certain police commissioner Wassin, who at first took him for his younger brother (the Colonel of Napoleon's Grande Armée, Jean-Chrysostôme Calès) with whom he had served. There, to survive, he continued practicing medicine, as well as other activities, such as works on the agricultural economy, as he mentioned himself in a revelatory letter addressed to one of his nephews Godefroy Calès (and to his five-year-old grand-nephew, Jean Jules Godefroy Calès, both future Republican representatives in 1848 and 1885), which gives an interesting piece of information about his new life in the Belgian city. He also demonstrates in this letter that, until the twilight of his life, he kept a constant execration of the nobility:

« These nobles have no nobility and, as long as this caste will exist, it will be the misfortune of France. I do not wish it to be annihilated, but I would have it put into the inability to harm. »

Shortly after his arrival at Liège, the Bourbons, answering to the solicitations of a friend to whom Calès had saved the life during the Terror, consented to let him return to France, but Calès refused, alleging that being exiled by a law, he could only come back by a law. After the Revolution of July 1830, he did not wish to take advantage of the abrogation of the amnesty law promulgated by the Monarchy of July, and thus he never returned to France.

Calès died, six years after his wife, in Liège on 13 April 1834, at the age of 76, and after 18 years of exile.

=== Genealogy ===
Jean-Marie Calès is:

- the elder brother of Jean-Chrysostôme Calès (1769–1853), colonel of the Great Army and baron of the Empire. He has also been elected representative of the ephemeral Chamber of Representatives created by Napoleon during the period of the Hundred Days in 1815.
- the uncle of Godefroy Calès (1799–1868), deputy at the Constituent National Assembly (Second Republic) (1848–1849).
- the great-uncle of Jean Jules Godefroy Calès (1828–1889), deputy at the Chamber of Deputies (Third Republic) (1885–1889).

== Bibliography ==
- Roger Caratini, Dictionnaire des personnages de la Révolution, Ed. Le pré aux Clercs, 1988, 580 p. (ISBN 2-7144-2232-2)
- « Jean-Marie Calès », in Robert et Cougny, Dictionnaire des parlementaires français, 1889
- « Jean-Marie Calès » in Joseph François Michaud et Louis Gabriel Michaud, « Biographie universelle, ancienne et moderne, ou Histoire, par ordre alphabétique, de la vie publique et privée de tous les hommes qui se sont fait remarquer par leurs écrits, leurs actions, leurs talents, leurs vertus ou leurs crimes » (Volume 59, pp. 556–557), Michaud frères, 1835.
- « Jean-Marie Calès » in « La Grande Encyclopédie – The great encyclopedia: reasoned inventory of sciences, letters and arts » (Volume 8, p. 911), by a society of scholars and literary people; under the dir. of MM. Marcellin Berthelot,...Ferdinand-Camille Dreyfus et al. Publisher: H. Lamirault (Paris) then Société anonyme of "La Grande encyclopédie" (Paris) (1885–1902) Contributor: Dreyfus, Camille (1851–1905). Identifier: ark:/12148/bpt6k246438. Source: National Library of France. Available in French on the website of Gallica.fr: http://gallica.bnf.fr/ark:/12148/bpt6k246438.image.langFR.f3.pagination
- « Jean-Marie Calès » in the « Galerie historique des contemporains, ou Nouvelle biographie » (Historic gallery of the contemporaries, or New biography), Volume 3, by Pierre Louis Pascal Jullian, Gerrit Van Lennep, Philippe Lesbroussart., editions Aug. Wahlen & Co (1818).
- Biography of Jean-Marie Calès on the website of the French National Assembly: http://www2.assemblee-nationale.fr/sycomore/fiche/(num_dept)/12960
- « Le Conventionnel Jean-Marie Calés (1757–1834): du Lauragais à Liège. » by Pierre Arches, Actes des 115e et 116e Congrès nationaux des Soc. savantes, Avignon, 1990 et Chambéry, 1991, Section d'H. moderne et cont., T. II, (1992), pp. 225–232.
- « Compendium of Acts of the Committee of Public Safety with the official correspondence of the representatives on mission and the register of the provisional executive council » published by François-Alphonse Aulard (Scientific editor), Chapter "Representatives on mission", Volume 19th, Imprimerie Nationale (National Library of France), Paris, 1909. Public domain. Identifier: ark:/12148/bpt6k62213544. Available in French on the website of Gallica.fr: http://gallica.bnf.fr/ark:/12148/bpt6k62213544
