= Calès =

The name Calès may refer to:

== Places ==
Calès is the name of two communes in France:

- Calès, Dordogne
- Calès, Lot

== People ==
- Jean-Marie Calès (1757–1834), French politician (republican deputy under the Ist Republic)
- Jean-Chrysostôme Calès (1769–1853), French Colonel and Baron (deputy under the Ist Empire)
- Godefroy Calès (1799–1868), French politician (republican deputy under the IInd Republic)
- Jean Jules Godefroy Calès (1828–1899), French politician (republican deputy under the IIIrd Republic)
