= Cales (disambiguation) =

Cales may refer to:

- Cales, an ancient city of Campania, Italy, on the Via Latina
- Cales (Bithynia), an emporium or trading place on the coast of ancient Bithynia
- Cales (river), a river of ancient Bithynia
- Cales (wasp), a genus of Chalcidoid wasps
- Cales, Dordogne, France
- Cales, Lot, France
- "Cales" or "Calis", a common Middle English spelling of Cádiz, Spain

== See also ==
- Calès (disambiguation)
- Cale (disambiguation)
