= Cale =

Cale may refer to:

== People ==
- Cale (name), including a list of people and fictional characters with the name
- Calé, an endonym used by Romani subgroups in Spain and Portugal

== Places ==
- Cale, Arkansas, a town in Nevada County, Arkansas, United States
- Cale, Indiana, an unincorporated community in Martin County, Indiana, United States
- Portus Cale, an ancient town and port in northern Portugal
- The River Cale, which runs through Wincanton in Somerset, Great Britain (and gives the town its name)

== Other uses ==
- Cale, a common name for fish in the family Odacidae
- Cale:Drew, a 2003 album by New Zealand band Jakob

== See also ==
- Cales (disambiguation)
- Calès (disambiguation)
- Kale (disambiguation)
