= Jean Jules Godefroy Calès =

French politician (1828–1899)

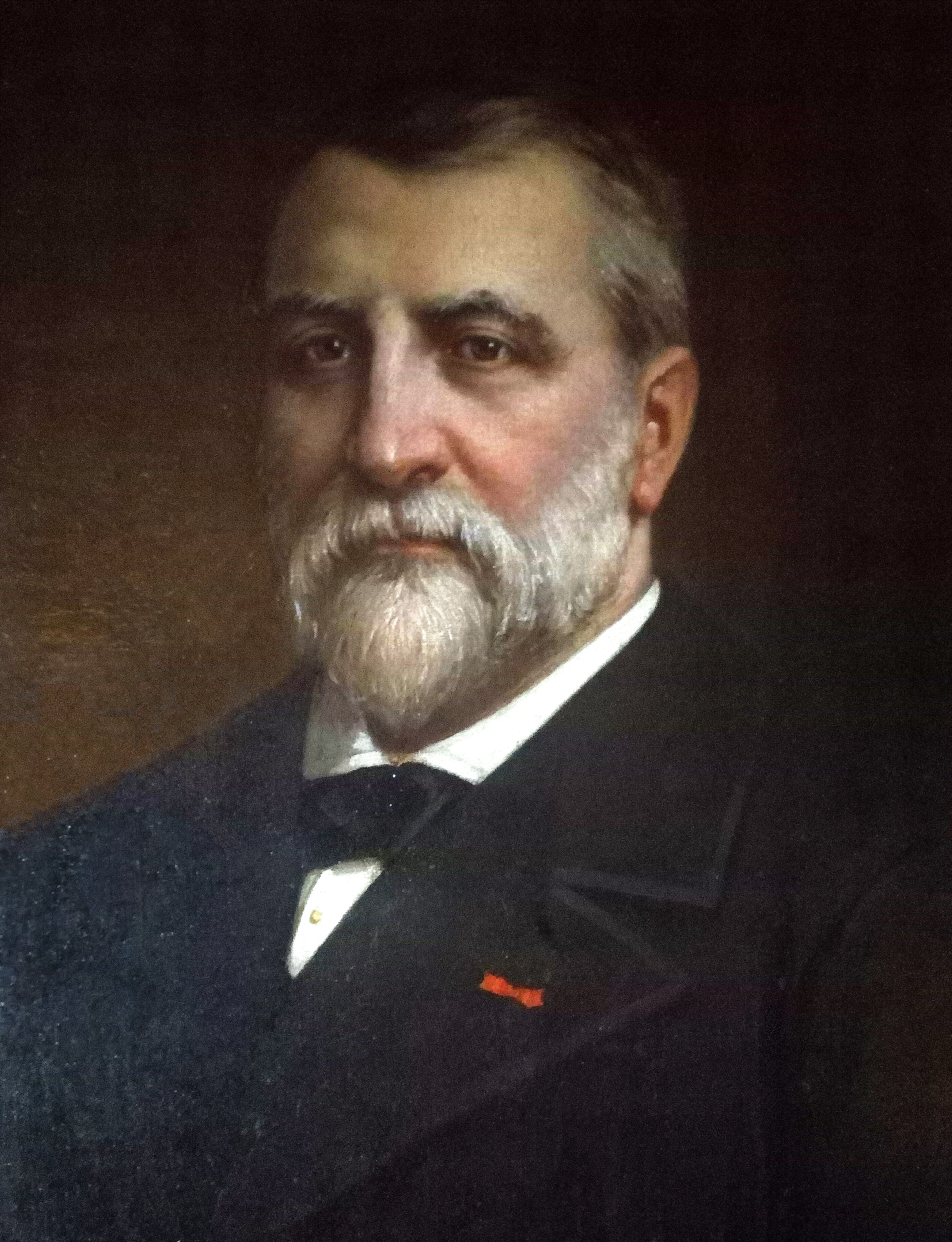

Deputy in the Chamber of Deputies (3rd Republic) of Haute-Garonne
- In office 18 October 1885 – 11 November 1899

Mayor of Villefranche-de-Lauragais
- In office 1875–1892

Personal details
- Born: July 24, 1828 Villefranche-de-Lauragais (Haute-Garonne)
- Died: November 2, 1899 (aged 71) Bordeaux (Gironde)
- Party: Left wing; Moderate Republicans; Republican Union; Opportunist Republicans
- Profession: Politician; Physician
- Awards: Chevalier de l'Ordre de la Légion d'Honneur (Knight); Officier de l'Ordre des Palmes Académiques (Officer)

Jean Jules Godefroy Calès (French pronunciation: [ʒɑ̃ ʒyl ɡɔdfʁwa kalɛs]) was a French politician and physician. He was born on July 24, 1828, in Villefranche-de-Lauragais (Haute-Garonne) and died on November 2, 1899, in Bordeaux (Gironde).

== Biography ==
« Son of Jean Marie Noël Godefroy Calès, physician doctor, and of dame Léonie Alphonsine Zulmée Metgé », Jean Jules Godefroy Calès was born in Villefranche-de-Lauragais (Haute-Garonne) on July 24, 1828. His father, the doctor Godefroy Calès (1799–1868) was a deputy (Représentant du Peuple) of Haute-Garonne at the Constituent National Assembly (1848–1849) under the French Second Republic. His grandfather, Jean Calès (1764–1840), also physician, was the Administrator of Haute-Garonne and Inspector-General of military hospitals. His grand-uncles were Jean-Marie Calès (1757–1834), who was deputy at the National Convention and at the Council of Five Hundred under the French Revolution, and Jean-Chrysostôme Calès (1769–1853), who was colonel of the Great Army, baron of the Empire and elected at the ephemeral Chamber of Representatives created by Napoléon Bonaparte during the period of the Hundred Days in 1815. The Calès family came from old Protestant families rooted in the region of Lauragais and forced to convert to Catholicism after the revocation of the Edict of Nantes issued by King Louis XIV in 1685.

=== Under the Second French Empire (1852–1870) ===
Jean Jules Godefroy studied medicine in Paris and in Montpellier, and, after receiving his doctor's degree in 1854, he settled in his native town of Villefranche-de-Lauragais. He exercised there, and free of charge, the functions of doctor of the prisons, of the gendarmerie, of the charity office, and of the schools & assisted children. He was later elected Municipal Councilor (1863–1875) and then Mayor of Villefranche-de-Lauragais (1875–1892), a function he exercised for nearly seventeen years. He also became General Councilor of the canton of Villefranche from 1880 to 1898.

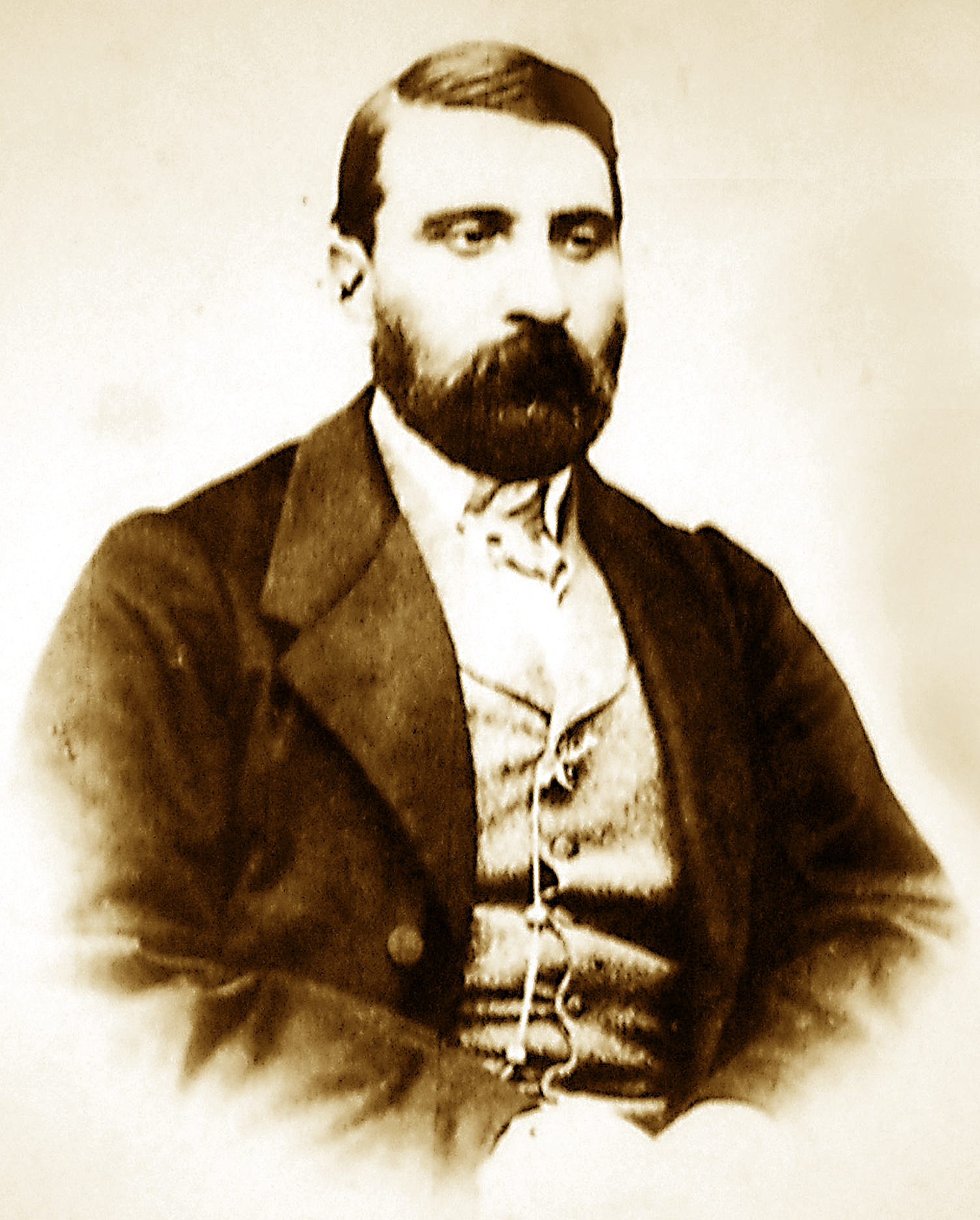
Jean Jules Godefroy Calès (photograph of the second half of the 19th century)

During the Second French Empire, Calès took part to the fights of the Democratic Party against Emperor Napoleon III, and presented his candidature to the Corps législatif (French parliament), as a candidate of the Republican Opposition at the Legislative Elections of May 24, 1869, in the 3rd district of Haute-Garonne: he failed, obtaining however 7,730 votes against 16,523 for the official candidate, the outgoing Bonapartist deputy M. Piccioni. The famous leader of the French Socialist Party Jules Guesde will report with ardor, indignation and with a certain sense of irony, this electoral defeat of the doctor Calès in a polemical article published the August 31, 1869, in his republican newspaper « La liberté de l’Hérault »:

« Do we want to know the difference between the Authoritarian Empire and the Liberal Empire? Last May, Mr. Jules Calès, a doctor of medicine installed in Villefranche (Haute-Garonne), ran against Mr. Piccioni. Upon which he is dismissed from his functions of cantonal doctor. That was the Authoritarian Empire. Dr. Calès remains deaf to this first warning. He maintains his democratic candidacy. And on the 17th of August – that is to say, just three days after the amnesty – he is dismissed from his duties of prison doctor. That is the Liberal Empire. »

— Jules Guesde

=== Under the French Third Republic (1870–1885) ===
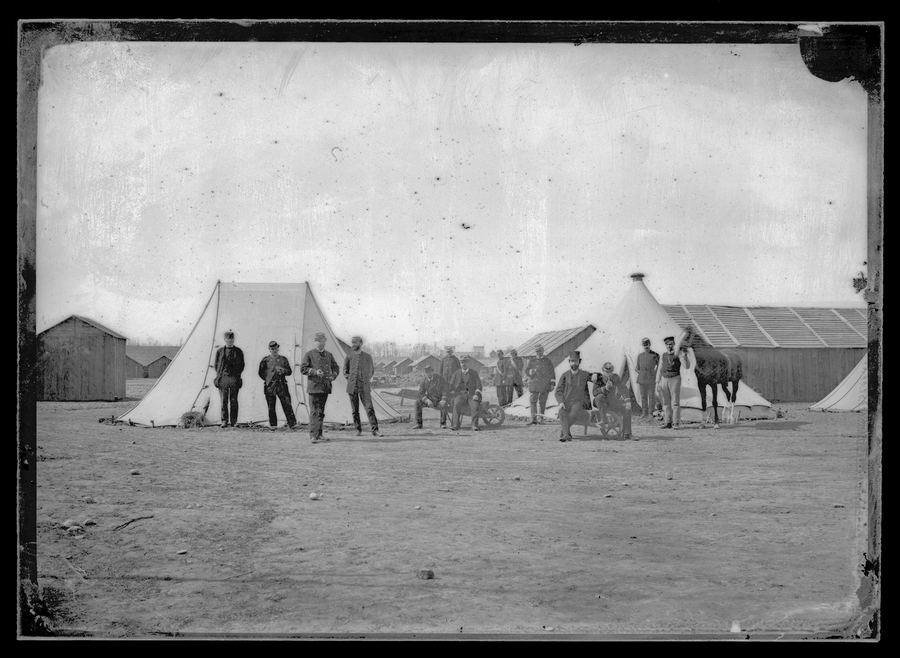
Toulouse military camp in February 1871 (photography by Eugène Trutat – City Archives of Toulouse)

After the outbreak of the Franco-German war on July 19, 1870, Calès was appointed, Sub-Prefect of his Arrondissement on September 5, 1870, just three days after the defeat of the French troops at the battle of Sedan and the capitulation of Napoleon III on September 2 (which provoked his exile and the fall of the Second Empire), and the next day only after the proclamation of the Third Republic by Republican leader Léon Gambetta, on September 4. But soon he considered that his place was with those who defended France against the Prussian invasion. He thus resigned from his new position and joined the Army in November, in one of the eleven regional military camps created by Gambetta, who was newly appointed Minister of the Interior and of War in the Government of National Defense. He was appointed Chief Physician of the military Camp of Toulouse on November 20, 1870, a position he held until his demobilization on March 15, 1871.

After the victory of the German troops, the signing of the Armistice of Versailles on January 28, 1871, and the suspension of the hostilities, and in accordance with the German requirements which stipulated that elections should be organized rapidly to form an Assembly aimed at ratifying peace, Calès made a second electoral attempt at the Legislative Elections of February 8, 1871: he arrived first on the list of the Republican Party led by Gambetta with 27,349 votes. However, the mixed list of the National Union, essentially composed of Monarchists, won (M. de Belcastel, the last elected member of this list, passed with 63,123 votes). The newly formed Assembly, mostly monarchist and favorable to peace, invested on February 19, a new government headed by Adolphe Thiers.

He was not more successful at the Legislative Elections of August 21, 1881; 4,229 « opportunistic» votes (Moderate Republicans, center-left) were reported on his name in the second district of Toulouse, but the outgoing Radical-socialist (extreme-left) deputy and ex-Prefect of Haute-Garonne in 1870, Armand Duportal was reelected with 4,618 votes.

Jean Jules Godefroy Calès, however, was made Knight of the Legion of Honor (Chevalier de la Légion d'Honneur) on July 9, 1883.

=== At the French Parliament (1885–1889) ===
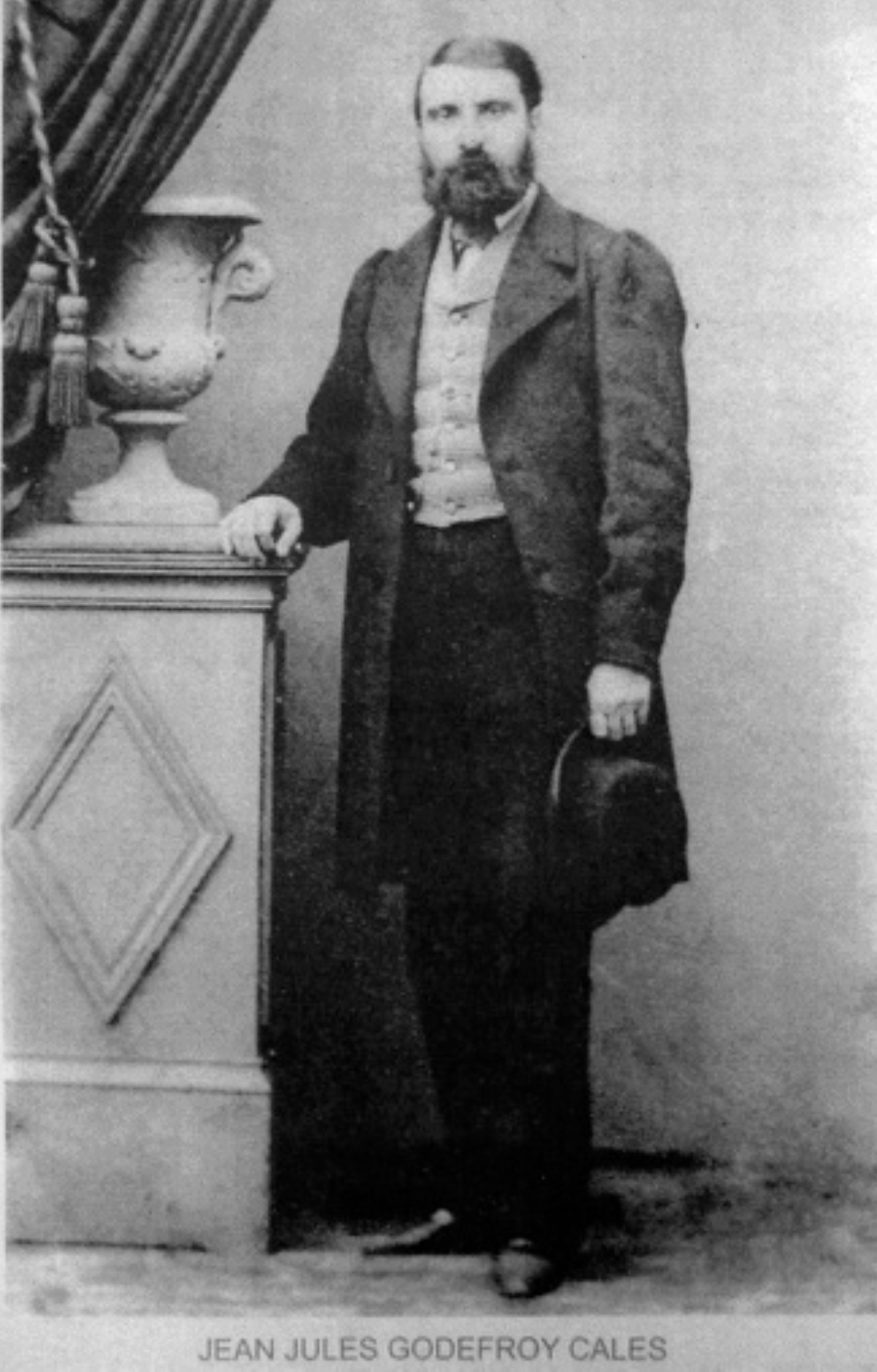
Jean Jules Godefroy Calès

Jean Jules Godefroy Calès was finally elected deputy of Haute-Garonne at the Legislative Elections of October 4, 1885. As general councilor of Villefranche since 1880, he was placed on the list of the Moderate Republicans and obtained 27,244 votes in the first round. Several Republicans of diverse horizons decided to concentrate their votes on his list for the second round, to stop the success of the Monarchists (who had already two elected candidates). Thus, Calès passed as the penultimate of the list, on October 18, 1885, and was elected with 57,621 votes (out of 113,803 voters and 138,226 registered).

Calès sat within the parliamentary group of the Radical Left, and held, in his votes, an almost equal balance between the Moderate and Opportunists Republicans and the Radicals Republicans, both in the majority of this new chamber, due to their grouping, and this, despite the push of the Conservative Union of the Monarchists and Bonapartists. Calès thus sat during 4 years, during the IVth legislature which took place from November 10, 1885, to November 11, 1889, under the presidency of the Republic of Jules Grévy (until December 2, 1887) and then of Sadi Carnot.

Calès neither supported the Freycinet government (1886) nor the Goblet government (1886–87), both composed of broad parliamentary coalitions and including General Boulanger at the War Ministry. The General Georges Ernest Boulanger was an extremely popular politician, promoter of an aggressive nationalism (known as revanchism) against Germany (he was nicknamed « Général Revanche »), and powerful enough to establish himself as dictator at the zenith of his popularity in January 1889, obliging the Republican camp to reorganize and strengthen its solidarity in opposition to him. After having shaken the Third Republic, the General was finally condemned, fled France, and committed suicide in Belgium in 1891. Calès supported however the Rouvier government (1887), in which General Boulanger was dismissed, the Tirard government (1887–88), composed by the President of the Republic Sadi Carnot, newly elected by the Senate and the Chamber of Deputies on December 2, 1887, the government Floquet (1888–89) and the second government Tirard (1889–90), all governments with a Republican opportunist majority. Established during the Boulanger affair, this prestigious cabinet, in which four former presidents of the council were seating (Fallières, de Freycinet, Rouvier and Tirard), was also supported by Radical Republicans to counter the Boulangist movement. In this last parliamentary session, Calès abstained on the re-establishment of the uni-nominal ballot (law of February 13, 1889), voted against the indefinite postponement of Constitutional revision, in favor of the Lisbon bill restrictive on the freedom of the press, and for the prosecution of three deputies who were members the far-right Ligue des Patriotes which was dissolved on April 3, 1889. In particular, he voted on April 4, 1889, in favor of the prosecution of General Boulanger « for conspiracy and treasonable activity », thus marking the twilight of Boulangism.

At the end of his mandate, Calès did not postulate for a second one (Legislative Elections of September 22, 1889).

Like his father Godefroy Calès (1799–1868), Jean-Jules had a close friendship relation with the writer, philosopher, poet, historian, professor at the Collège de France and republican politician Edgar Quinet (1803–1875) and his second wife, Hermiona Asachi (1821–1900). His father and Quinet had already met on the benches of the Constituent National Assembly of 1848 and had shared, then, many common ideas. The son maintained a regular epistolary correspondence from 1868 to 1973 with the couple Quinet during their forced exile in Switzerland (sent by Napoleon III) and after their return to France in 1870. The Quinet will respond to the invitation of Calès and come to visit him several times in Villefranche-de-Lauragais. Madame Quinet wrote later:

« It is a family adored in the country, respected by its opponents: since 89, leaders of the Lauragais democracy from father to son. From the Conventional [Jean-Marie Calès], to the representative of the Constituent Assembly [Godefroy Calès], all republicans, men of heart. Jules Calès, our friend, is indeed the worthy son of a worthy father »

— Madame Edgar Quinet

=== At the Direction of the psychiatric Hospital « Château-Picon » of Bordeaux (1889–1899) ===
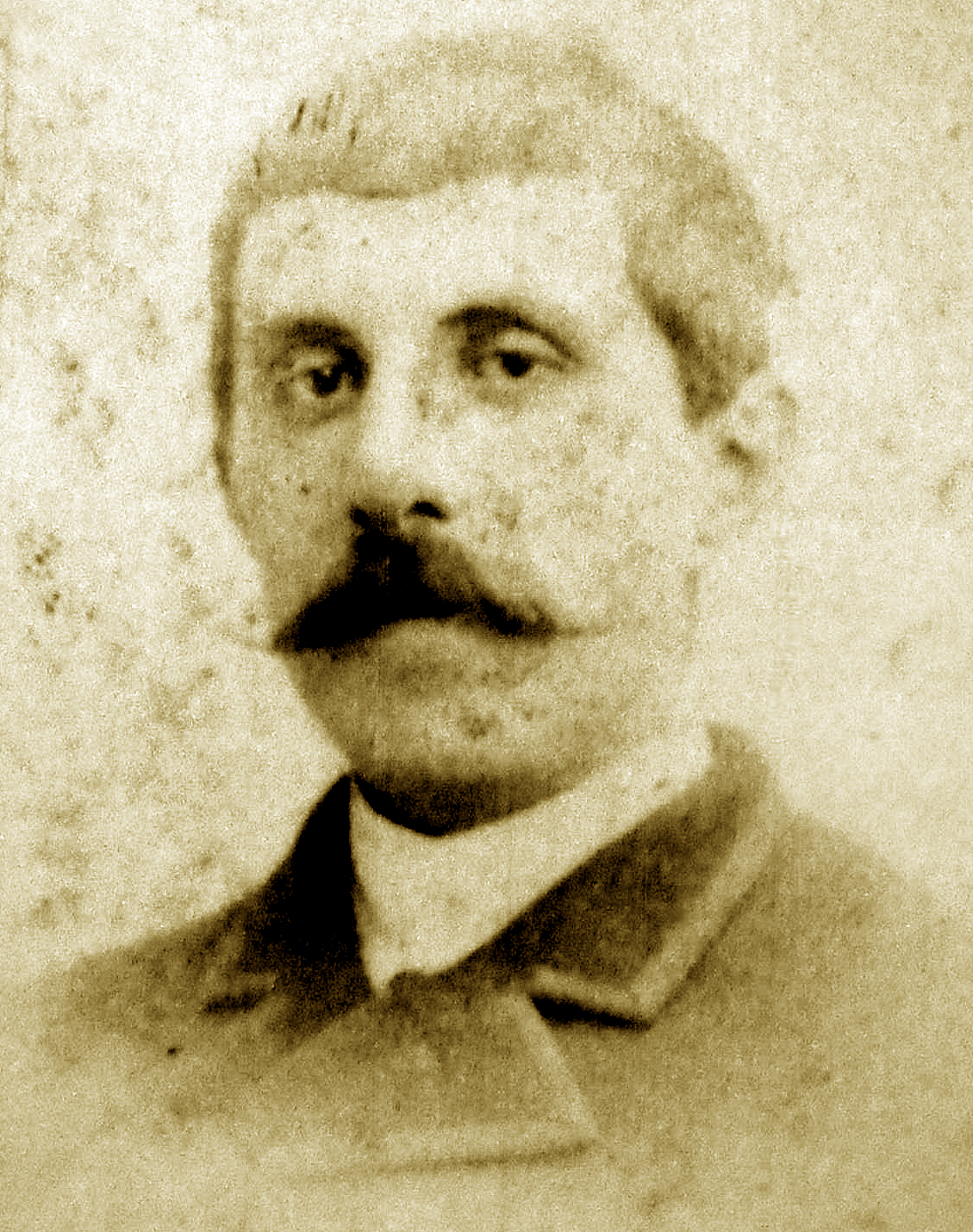
Albert Calès, his son, also Mayor of Villefranche-de-Lauragais

Following his parliamentary career, Calès was appointed, on September 2, 1889, and until his death in November 1899, Director of the psychiatric asylum of Bordeaux, « Château-Picon » (since 1974: Hospital Center Charles Perrens). He died in this city on November 2, 1899, at the age of 71.

He had with his wife Paule Laure Blanc only one son, Godefroy Victor Albert Calès (born in Villefranche on October 31, 1856, and deceased in Sarcelles in 1940), who will succeed him later, as sub-Prefect of Florac (Lozère, 1894), then as Mayor of Villefranche-de-Lauragais (1896–1904) – where he installed public electricity for the first time in the city – and finally as General Councilor of the canton of Villefranche (1898–1904 then 1907–1914) in the list of the Radical-socialist party. Albert Calès presented, without success, his candidature at the legislative elections of 1906 (the candidate of the moderate Right, Henri Auriol, won). He was then appointed to the warehouse administration for tobacco in Bordeaux and finally tax collector in Dammartin-en-Goële in the region of Paris, where he had a rather controversial end of life.

Albert Calès was married three times during his life, first with Marie Cabantous (who died very early, on September 13, 1882, in Villefranche) with whom he had his unique daughter (Augustine Laure Marthe Calès, deceased in 1977, the only descendant of Jean Jules Godefroy and Albert Calès), then with Jeanne Cavé-Esgaris (also deceased early), and finally with Jeanne Pebernad de Langautier (1875–1962), whom he will marry on September 14, 1902.

== Decorations and honors ==
Chevalier de l'Ordre de la légion d'Honneur (Knight rank - July 9, 1883).

Officier de l'Ordre des Palmes Académiques (Officer rank - « Officier d’Académie »).

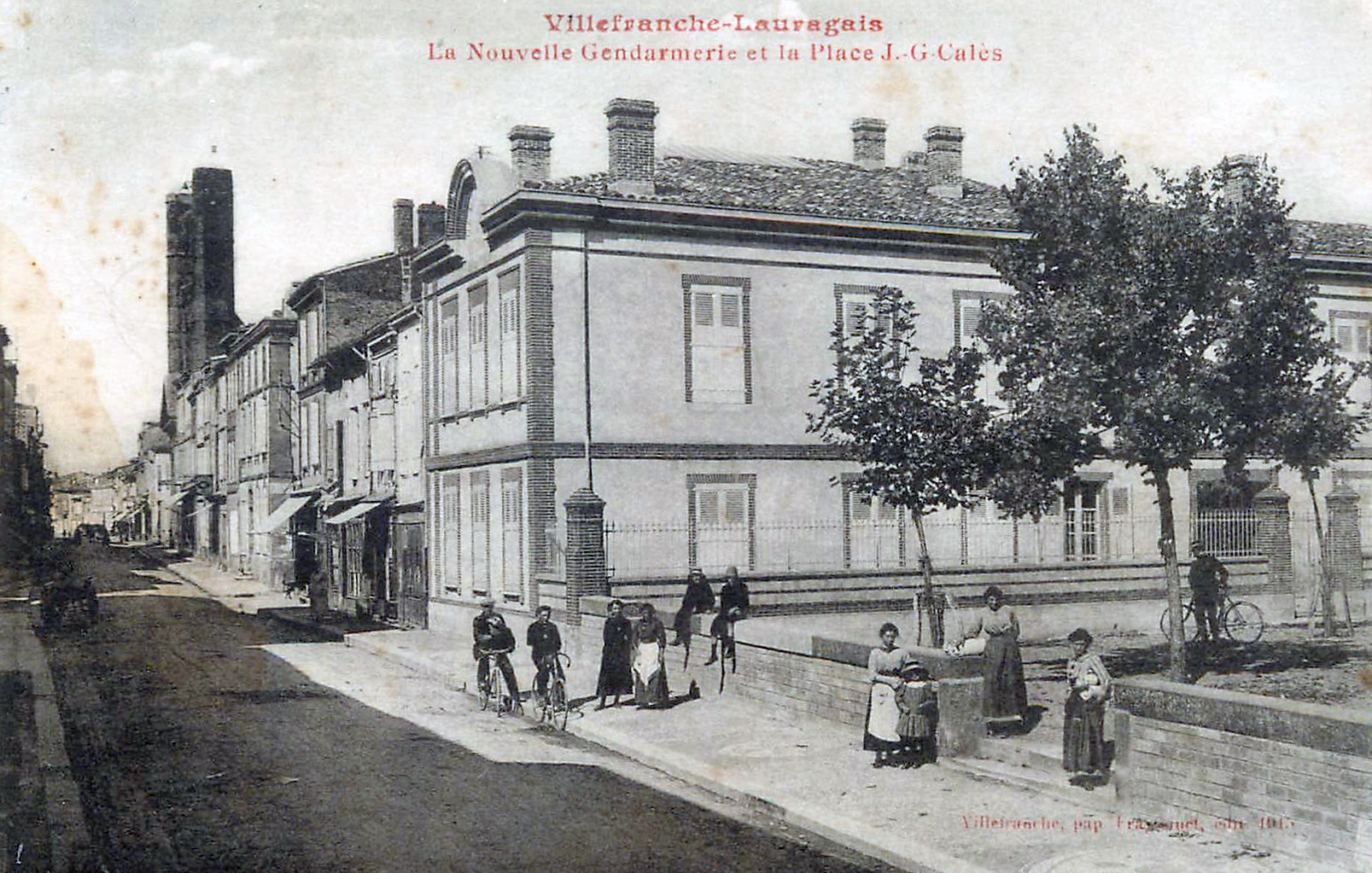
Square J.-G Calès in Villefranche-de-Lauragais, in 1915 (editions Papeterie Frayssinet)

== Hommage ==
- A town square was named after him in the commune of Villefranche-de-Lauragais (Haute-Garonne), near Toulouse.
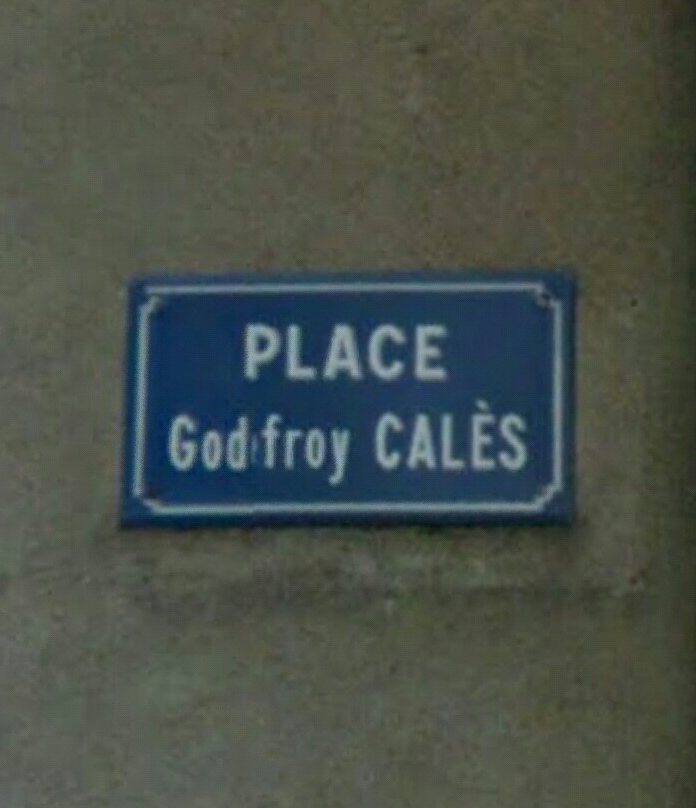

== Genealogy ==
Jean Jules Godefroy Calès is:

- the grand-nephew of Jean-Marie Calès (1757–1834), regicide and deputy at the National Convention (1792–1795) and at the Council of Five Hundred (1795–1798).
- the grand-nephew of Jean-Chrysostôme Calès (1769–1853), colonel of the Great Army and baron of the Empire. He has also been elected representative of the ephemeral Chamber of Representatives created by Napoleon during the period of the Hundred Days in 1815.
- the son of Godefroy Calès (1799–1868), deputy at the Constituent National Assembly (Second Republic) (1848–1849).

== Annexes ==
=== Bibliography ===
- « Jean Jules Godefroy Calès », in Robert et Cougny, Dictionnaire des parlementaires français, 1889
- Biography of Jean Jules Godefroy Calès on the website of the French National Assembly: http://www2.assemblee-nationale.fr/sycomore/fiche/%28num_dept%29/1376
- Ordre de la Légion d'honneur: Archives of Jean Jules Godefroy Calès on the Léonore database.
- « Lettres de Jean-Jules Calès à Edgar Quinet et à Mme Edgar Quinet (1868–1873) » by Pierre Arches, in Bulletin de la Société archéologique, historique littéraire & scientifique du Gers (January 1992), pp. 224–236. Source: National Library of France. Rights: Public Domain. Free reading online on the website of the National Library Gallica: http://gallica.bnf.fr/ark:/12148/bpt6k65770312/f226
- « Lettres d'exil à Michelet et à divers amis » (Exile Letters to Michelet and to diverse friends) by Edgar Quinet, in 4 volumes, Editions Calmann Lévy (1886). Public Domain. Free reading online on the website of "the Internet Archive" (Digitized by Google) https://archive.org/details/lettresdexilmic01quingoog
- « Edgar Quinet depuis l'exil » (Edgar Quinet from exile) by Mrs. Edgar Quinet, Hermione (1821–1900). Publisher: Calmann Lévy (Paris), 1889. Public domain. In French. Identify: ark: / 12148 / bpt6k836945. Source: National Library of France, Literature and Art Department, 8-Ln27-40314. Available on Gallica's website: http://gallica.bnf.fr/ark:/12148/bpt6k836945/
- « Une famille du Midi du XVIIe siècle à nos jours : les Calès et leur descendance » (A southern family from the 17th century to the present day: the Calès and their descendants) by Pierre Arches, in la Revue du Tarn, no. 136 (1989), pp. 611–627.
