= Cale (name) =

Cale is a surname and a male given name. Cale may refer to:

== People ==
=== Given name ===
- Cale J. Bradford, American judge
- Cale Boyter (born 1972), American film producer
- Cale Case (born 1958), American politician and economist
- Cale Conley (born 1992), American racing car driver
- Cale Dodds (born 1988), American country music artist
- Cale Fleury (born 1998), Canadian ice hockey player
- Cale Gale (born 1985), American racing driver
- Cale Gundy (born 1972), American football player
- Cale James Holder (1912–1983), American judge
- Cale Hooker (born 1988), Australian football player
- Cale Hulse (born 1973), Canadian ice hockey player
- Cale Iorg (born 1985), American baseball player
- Cale Keable (born 1976), American politician
- Cale Loughrey (born 2001), Canadian soccer player
- Cale Makar (born 1998), Canadian hockey player
- Cale Morton (born 1990), Australian football player
- Cale Parks, American musician
- Cale Sampson (born 1979), Canadian hip-hop artist
- Cale Simmons (born 1991), American pole vaulter
- Cale Yarborough (1939–2023), American racing car driver
- Cale Young Rice (1872–1943), American poet and dramatist

=== Surname ===
- Bruce Cale (born 1939), Australian jazz musician
- David Cale (born 1958 or 1959), English-American playwright, actor, and songwriter
- Elton Calé (born 1988), Brazilian footballer
- Franklin Cale (born 1983), South African football player
- Guillaume Cale (died 1358), French peasant leader
- JJ Cale (1938–2013), American songwriter and musician
- John Cale (born 1942), Welsh musician
- Hrvoje Čale (born 1985), Croatian footballer
- Maya Cale-Bentzur (born 1958), Israeli Olympic runner and long jumper
- Pandeli Cale (1879–1923), Albanian politician
- Paula Cale (born 1970), American actress
- Ray Cale (1922–2006), Welsh rugby player
- Rosalie Balmer Smith Cale (1875–1958), American composer
- Thomas Cale (1848–1941), American politician
- Zachary Cale (born 1978), American singer-songwriter

== Fiction ==
- Cale (Ronin Warriors), a character in the anime Ronin Warriors
- Erevis Cale, fictional character in the Forgotten Realms book series
- Veronica Cale, fictional character in the DC Comics universe
- Cale Tucker, fictional character and the main protagonist of the Don Bluth film Titan A.E.
- John Cale, fictional character in the film White House Down
- Thomas Cale, fictional character in the Paul Hoffman novel The Left Hand of God
- Cale Henituse, fictional character and the main protagonist of the novel Lout of the count's family

== See also ==
- Cale (disambiguation)
- Caleb (given name), a list of people with the given name
- Caley (given name), a list of people with the given name
- Calle (name), a list of people with the given name and surname
