= Cale Sampson =

Canadian hip hop artist

- Born: January 11, 1979 (age 47); Toronto, Ontario, Canada
- Genres: Canadian hip hop
- Occupations: Rapper; songwriter; singer
- Years active: 2002–present
- Label: Heads Connect Ent
- Website: www.calesampson.com

Cale Sampson (born January 11 in Toronto, Ontario, Canada) is a Canadian rapper.

== Biography ==
Sampson first emerged in the early 2000s as a member of the group Rhythmicru, who released several independent albums which were popular in the Toronto hip hop scene. Their biggest hit was a song called "The Facts of War" about George Bush and the war in Iraq. It also appears as a track on Sampson's self-titled debut.

After Rhythmicru split up, Sampson started a solo career. He then joined forces with some of Canada's most prominent hip hop producers, including Classified and DJ Kemo of The Rascalz and opened for such acts as Guru from Gang Starr, Maestro Fresh-Wes, The Hilltop Hoods, Eyedea & Abilities, and Scratch from The Roots. He has also performed on the Van's Warped Tour, as well as at NXNE. Sampson released his first full-length album, Cale Sampson in 2009 and his second album The Big Picture in 2013.

=== Critical acclaim ===
Sampson's debut solo album, Cale Sampson received highly positive reviews from the critics and peaked on both the Earshot and ChartAttack charts as the #3 most played hip hop album on Canadian college radio. In 2009, Cale Sampson was also named "Best Songwriter of the Year" by Now Magazine for their annual "Best of T.O." edition.

Sampson's second album, The Big Picture which focused primarily on global issues such as war, technology and economics, was also very well received. Writing for The Caper Times in September 2013, George Pink responded positively to the album stating that "the lyrics are nothing short of spectacular" and calling The Big Picture "a very brave, bold and fantastically written hip hop album. It is a gift to the ears as well as the mind".

=== Work outside of music ===
In his youth, Sampson had a small acting role opposite Vince Vaughn in the feature film A Cool, Dry Place. He had no acting experience prior to taking this role. Sampson tried out as an extra after being handed a flyer in his school. Despite his lack of previous experience, he was given the role of a high school basketball player named "Peter".

== Discography ==
- Cale Sampson – 2009
- The Big Picture – 2013
