= Villefranche-de-Lauragais =

- Commune
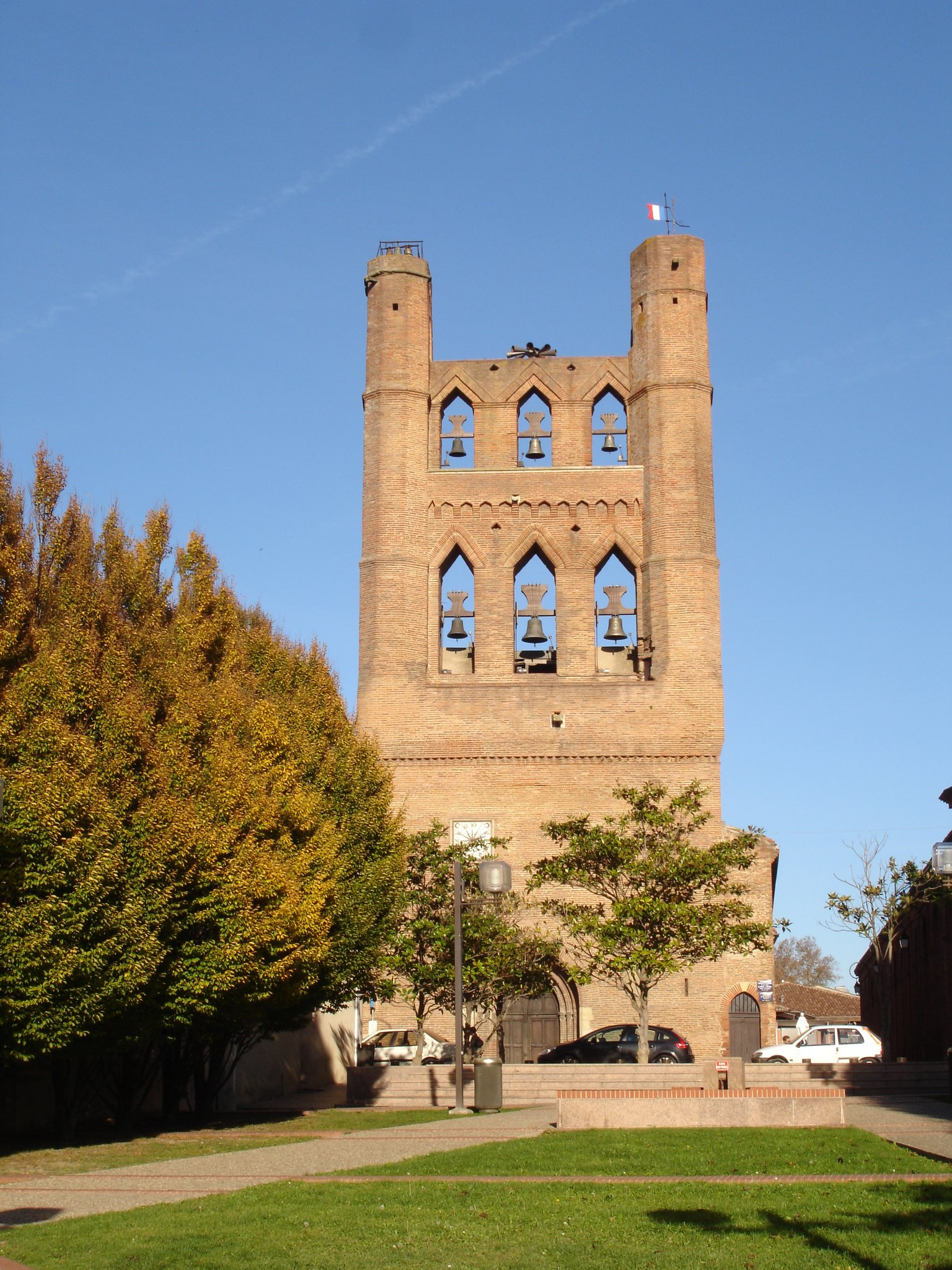
- The church in Villefranche-de-Lauragais

- Coat of arms
- Location of Villefranche-de-Lauragais
- Location within France Location within Occitanie
- Coordinates: 43°24′02″N 1°43′08″E
- Country: France
- Region: Occitania
- Department: Haute-Garonne
- Arrondissement: Toulouse
- Canton: Revel

Government
  - Mayor (2022–2026): Valérie Grafeuille Roudet
- Area^{1}: 10.35 km^{2} (4.00 sq mi)
- Elevation: 175 m (574 ft)
- Highest elevation: 256 m (840 ft)
- Lowest elevation: 168 m (551 ft)
- Population (2023): 5,072
  - Density: 490.0/km^{2} (1,269/sq mi)
- Time zone: UTC+01:00 (CET)
  - Summer (DST): UTC+02:00 (CEST)
- INSEE/Postal code: 31582 /31290
- ^{1} French Land Register data, which excludes lakes, ponds, glaciers > 1 km^{2} (0.386 sq mi or 247 acres) and river estuaries.

Villefranche-de-Lauragais (Languedocien: Vilafranca de Lauragués) is a commune in the Haute-Garonne department in southwestern France. Villefranche-de-Lauragais station has rail connections to Toulouse, Carcassonne and Narbonne.

== Population ==
The inhabitants of the commune are known as Villefranchois in French.

Historical population
Year	Pop.	±% p.a.
1968	2,771	—
1975	2,948	+0.89%
1982	3,127	+0.85%
1990	3,316	+0.74%
1999	3,338	+0.07%
2007	3,933	+2.07%
2012	4,188	+1.26%
2017	4,519	+1.53%
2023	5,072	+1.94%
Source: INSEE

== See also ==
- Communes of the Haute-Garonne department
