= Ferdinand-Camille Dreyfus =

French journalist and politician (1851–1905)

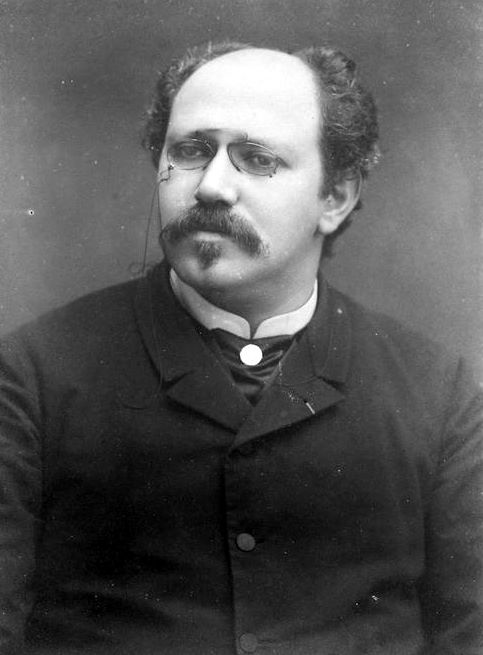

Ferdinand-Camille Dreyfus (19 August 1851 – 15 July 1915) was a French journalist and politician, unrelated to his contemporary Captain Alfred Dreyfus.

== Early life, family and education ==
Dreyfus was born in Paris. His family was Jewish. His parents were Israël "Isidore" Dreyfus (1821–1885) and Hana Athenaïs (née Waill) (1818–1892). After a classical and commercial education, he prepared himself for the École Polytechnique, but on the outbreak of the Franco-Prussian War left his studies to serve as a volunteer.

== Career ==
In 1873, he became editor of L'Avenir de la Sarthe. He spent five months in prison for opposing the dictatorship of MacMahon. He afterward controlled Le Libéral de la Vendée. In 1879, he became chief of the bureau of the financial under-secretary. Later, he represented the government at the Brussels Exhibition of 1880.

Becoming editor of La Lanterne in 1882, he founded two years later Le Matin. In December 1882, he was chosen to represent the Gros-Caillou quarter in the municipal council of Paris, and was reelected in 1884. Dreyfus in this position showed a remarkable aptitude for finance. In October, 1885, he was elected deputy by the department of the Seine, and was reelected, for the Twelfth District, in 1889, in opposition to a Boulangist candidate. A radical, with wide schemes of reform, Dreyfus sat with the Extreme Left. He was appointed a member of the army commission, and also on that of espionage.

His publications include: Une Dictature (Le Mans, 1874); Giboyer à Saint-Pélagie (Paris, 1875); L'Evolution des Mondes et des Sociétés (Paris, 1888); Les Traités de Commerce (Tours, 1879); Le Tunnel du Simplon et les Intérêts Français (Paris, 1879); L'Angleterre, son Gouvernement, ses Institutions (Paris, 1881); La Guerre Nécessaire, Réponse d'un Français à M. de Bismarck (Paris, 1890). Dreyfus was also secretary and part founder of La Grande Encyclopédie. He was a member of the Légion d'honneur.

== Personal life ==
He fought many duels, one with the Marquis de Morès, an anti-Semite.

He was married twice. He married Alice Trèves on October 9, 1876. He later married Adèle Porgès (1860–1917) on December 20, 1881, and they had two sons: Jacques (1884–1943) and Charles (1888–1942).
