= La Grande Encyclopédie =

La Grande Encyclopédie, inventaire raisonné des sciences, des lettres, et des arts (The Great Encyclopedia: a systematic inventory of science, letters, and the arts) is a 31-volume encyclopedia published in France from 1886 to 1902 by H. Lamirault, and later by the Société Anonyme de la Grande Encyclopédie (Grande Encyclopédie Company).

The general secretaries of its editorial board were Ferdinand-Camille Dreyfus and André Berthelot.

Major articles are signed and include a bibliography. In its 31 volumes of 1200 pages each, there are about 200,000 articles, 15,000 engraved illustrations and 200 maps.

From the Preface:

Despite numerous attempts, some of which were crowned with success in their time, France still does not have a great encyclopedic work, popular yet up-to-date with the latest progress of science....

The Grande Encyclopedie is a work of high popularization (haute vulgarisation). It presents the current state of modern knowledge, arranging a collection of the human knowledge of our time.

Staying above current disputes, resolute in not becoming a partisan tool, the Grande Encyclopedie has no rule other than the impartiality of science.

...It sets out facts with scrupulous precision, and diverse or contradictory theories with impartiality: it is up to the reader to compare them and reach conclusions.

In the article "Encyclopédie":

Since the publication of the Encyclopédie, no comparable work had been published, except in England. In 1882, a group of scholars and men of letters, at the initiative of Camille Dreyfus and the publisher Baer, undertook to fill this lacuna. At first, it was just a matter of an undertaking such as that of Brockhaus and of Appleton. But soon the plan was enlarged by Mr. Dreyfus, in agreement with the directors, to the scale of a true encyclopedia.

According to the Library of Congress catalog record, the individual volumes were published in the following years: 1-2: 1886, 3-4: 1887, 4: 1887, 5-6: 1888, 7-8: 1889, 8: 1889, 9-11: 1890, 12-13: 1891, 14-16: 1892, 17-18: 1893, 19-20: 1894, 21: 1895, 22: 1896, 23: 1898, 24-26: 1899, 27-8: 1900, 29-30: 1901, 31: 1902.
