= Calès, Dordogne =

Calès
- Commune
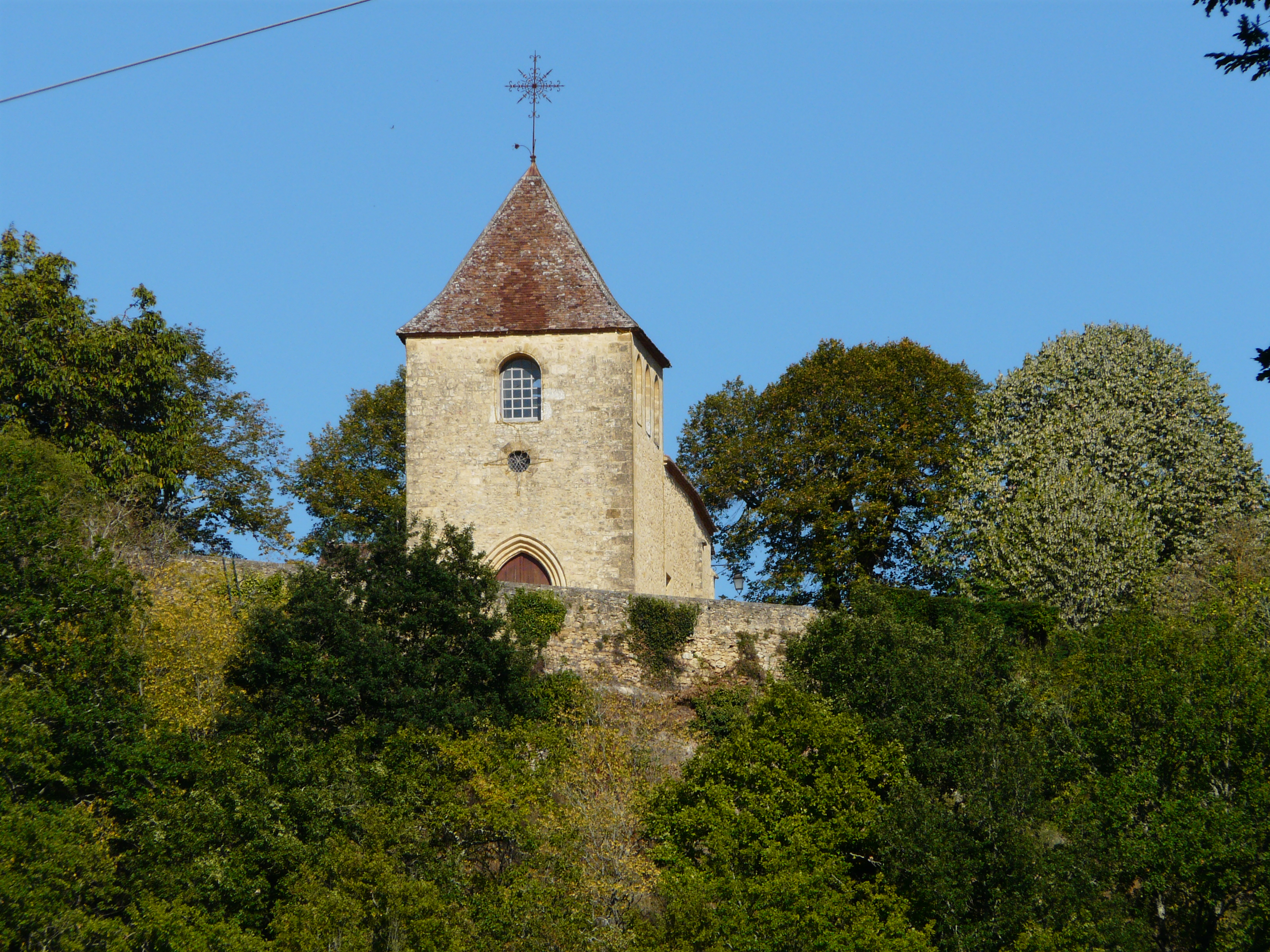
- The church in Calès
- Location of Calès
- Location within France Location within Nouvelle-Aquitaine
- Coordinates: 44°51′27″N 0°48′47″E
- Country: France
- Region: Nouvelle-Aquitaine
- Department: Dordogne
- Arrondissement: Bergerac
- Canton: Lalinde
- Intercommunality: Bastides Dordogne-Périgord

Government
  - Mayor (2020–2026): Christophe Cathus
- Area^{1}: 8.02 km^{2} (3.10 sq mi)
- Elevation: 111 m (364 ft)
- Highest elevation: 163 m (535 ft)
- Lowest elevation: 36 m (118 ft)
- Population (2023): 369
  - Density: 46.0/km^{2} (119/sq mi)
- Time zone: UTC+01:00 (CET)
  - Summer (DST): UTC+02:00 (CEST)
- INSEE/Postal code: 24073 /24150
- ^{1} French Land Register data, which excludes lakes, ponds, glaciers > 1 km^{2} (0.386 sq mi or 247 acres) and river estuaries.

Calès (French pronunciation: [kalɛs]; Occitan: Calés) is a commune in the Dordogne department in Nouvelle-Aquitaine in southwestern France.

== Population ==
Historical population
| Year | Pop. | ±% p.a. |
|---|---|---|
| 1968 | 380 | — |
| 1975 | 343 | −1.45% |
| 1982 | 312 | −1.34% |
| 1990 | 289 | −0.95% |
| 1999 | 304 | +0.56% |
| 2007 | 357 | +2.03% |
| 2012 | 383 | +1.42% |
| 2017 | 386 | +0.16% |
| 2023 | 369 | −0.75% |
Source: INSEE

== See also ==
- Communes of the Dordogne department
