= Chamber of Representatives (France) =

Lower body of the French Parliament (1815)

The Chamber of Representatives (French: Chambre des représentants) was the popularly elected lower body of the French Parliament set up under the Charter of 1815. The body had 629 members who were to serve five-year terms. The upper body was the Chamber of Peers.

== History ==
Jean Denis, comte Lanjuinais served as president of this body while it existed.

The Chamber of Representatives was short-lived. At the end of the Hundred Days, with the defeat of Napoleon at Waterloo, the chamber issued Napoleon a demand for abdication as Emperor of the French. On 22 June 1815 the Chamber of Representatives elected three members (Carnot, the duc d'Otrante, and the comte Grenier) of a five-member commission, the Commission de gouvernement, to constitute a new government, and on 23 June 1815 the Chamber of Representatives named Napoleon II as Emperor.

The allied powers of the Seventh Coalition soon occupied Paris, and the chamber capitulated on 3 July. It soon became clear that the occupiers wished to again restore the Bourbon monarchy. On 8 July 1815, the chamber was kept from meeting by armed force, effectively ending it.

With the restoration of the Bourbons, the Chamber of Deputies was returned as the lower body of Parliament. The reactionary Ultra-royalist delegation that was seated in October 1815 was nicknamed the Chambre introuvable.

== Proposed 1873 Chamber of Representatives ==
During the first years of the French Third Republic, France's Parliament was a unicameral National Assembly, elected in 1871, which also acted as a Constituent Assembly. The initial constitution, drawn up by this Assembly on 20 May 1873, provided for the re-establishment of Chamber of Representatives, with a Senate serving as the upper house. However, the final French Constitutional Laws of 1875 passed by it established the Chamber of Deputies as the lower house instead.
