= List of French Royal Army units (1776) =

Below is the List of French Army regiments (1776). Also included are the changes from the supplemental 1778 ordnance. Flags next to each unit represents what the majority of its members come from.

== Cavalry regiments ==
In 1776, the French Royal Army's cavalry regiments were divided into five different types: line cavalry, hussars, chasseurs à cheval, chevau-légers and dragoons.

=== Line cavalry regiments ===
- King's Cavalry Regiment
- Dauphin's Cavalry Regiment
- Commissary-General's Cavalry Regiment
- Colonel-General's Cavalry Regiment
- Royal Cravat Cavalry Regiment
- Royal Foreigner Cavalry Regiment
- Royal Piedmontese Cavalry Regiment
- Royal German Cavalry Regiment
- Royal Polish Cavalry Regiment
- Royal Lorraine Cavalry Regiment
- Royal Champagne Cavalry Regiment
- Royal Navarre Cavalry Regiment
- Royal Normandy Cavalry Regiment
- Burgundy Cavalry Regiment
- Berry Cavalry Regiment
- Nassau-Saarbrück Cavalry Regiment

=== Hussar regiments ===
- Colonel-General's Hussar Regiment
- Bercheny's Hussar Regiment
- Chamborant's Hussar Regiment
- Esterhazy's Hussar Regiment
- Conflans' Hussar Regiment

=== Dragoon regiments ===
- Royal Dragoon Regiment
- King's Dragoon Regiment
- Queen's Dragoon Regiment
- Colonel-General's Dragoon Regiment
- Camp-Master General's Dragoon Regiment
- Dauphin's Dragoon Regiment
- Monsieur's Dragoon Regiment
- Artois Dragoon Regiment
- Orléans Dragoon Regiment
- Chartres Dragoon Regiment (transferred from the line cavalry)
- Condé Dragoon Regiment
- Bourbon Dragoon Regiment
- Conti Dragoon Regiment (transferred from the line cavalry)
- Penthièvre Dragoon Regiment
- Boufflers' Dragoon Regiment
- Custine's Dragoon Regiment
- La Rochefoucauld's Dragoon Regiment
- Chabot's Dragoon Regiment
- Lanan's Dragoon Regiment
- Belzunce's Dragoon Regiment
- Languedoc's Dragoon Regiment
- Noailles' Dragoon Regiment
- Schomberg Dragoon Regiment

== Infantry regiments ==
In 1776, the French Royal Army's infantry regiments were divided into five groups: guard regiments, French line regiments, chasseur regiments, colonial line regiments and foreign line regiments.

=== Guard regiments ===
- French Guards (6 Battalions)
- Swiss Guards (4 Battalions)

=== French regiments ===
- Colonel-General's Regiment
- Picardy Regiment
- Piedmont Regiment
- Provence Regiment (formed in 1776)
- Navarre Regiment
- Armagnac Regiment (formed in 1776)
- Champagne Regiment
- Ponthieu Regiment (formed in 1776)
- Normandy Regiment
- Neustria Regiment (formed in 1776)
- Marine Regiment
- Auxerrois Regiment (formed in 1776)
- Auxerrois Regiment
- Forez Regiment (formed in 1776)
- Béarn Regiment
- Agénois Regiment (formed in 1776)
- Auvergne Regiment
- Gâtinais Regiment (formed in 1776)
- Flanders Regiment
- Cambrésis Regiment (formed in 1776)
- Guyenne Regiment
- Viennois Regiment (formed in 1776)
- Royal Regiment
- Brie Regiment (formed in 1775)
- Poitou Regiment
- Bresse Regiment (formed in 1775)
- Lyonnais Regiment
- Maine Regiment (formed in 1775)
- Dauphin's Regiment
- Perche Regiment (formed in 1775)
- Aunis Regiment
- Bassingby Regiment (formed in 1775)
- Touraine Regiment
- Régiment d'Angoulême
- Aquitaine Regiment
- Régiment d'Anjou (formed in 1775)
- Marshal of Turenne Regiment
- Dauphiné Regiment
- Isle de France Regiment
- Soissonnais Regiment
- Limousin Regiment
- Royal Vessels Regiment
- Regiment of the Crown
- Brittany Regiment
- Lorraine Regiment
- Vintimille Regiment
- Hainaut Regiment
- La Sarre Regiment
- La Fère Regiment
- Royal Roussillon Regiment
- Beauvoisis Regiment
- Rouergne Regiment
- Burgundy Regiment
- Royal Marine Regiment
- Vermandois Regiment
- Languedoc Regiment
- Beauce Regiment
- Médoc Regiment
- Vivarais Regiment
- Vexin Regiment
- Royal Comtois Regiment
- Beaujolais Regiment
- Boulonnais Regiment
- Angoumois Regiment
- Saintonge Regiment
- Foix Regiment
- Rohan Regiment
- Barrois Regiment

=== Princes' regiments ===
The Princes regiments were regiments which were either raised or funded almost entirely by a French prince or duke. The only difference between these regiments and other French Royal Army regiments were their funding and exclusion from the regimental uniform grouping.

- King's Regiment (4 Battalions)
- Queen's Regiment
- Duke of Orléans' Regiment
- Duke of Artois' Regiment
- Prince of Condé's Regiment
- Duke of Bourbon's Regiment
- Monsieur's Regiment
- Duke of Penthièvre's Regiment
- Prince of Conti's Regiment
- Duke of Chartres' Regiment
- Duke of Enghien's Regiment

=== German regiments ===
- Alsace Regiment
- Salm-Salm Regiment
- La Mark Regiment
- Royal Swedish Regiment
- Royal Bavarian Regiment
- Nassau Regiment
- Bouillon Regiment
- Royal Deux-Ponts Regiment
- Royal Liégeois Regiment

=== Swiss regiments ===
- Ernest's Regiment
- Salis-Samade Regiment
- Sonnemberg Regiment
- Castellas Regiment
- Waldner's Regiment
- Châteauvieux Regiment
- Diesbach's Regiment
- Courten Regiment
- Salis–Marschlins Regiment
- Steiner's Regiment
- Eptingen's Regiment

=== Irish regiments ===
- Irish Brigade
  - Dillon's Regiment
  - Berwick's Regiment
  - Walsh's Regiment

=== Italian regiments ===
- Royal Italian Regiment
- Savoyard Regiment (formed in 1775)

== Legions ==
Under the 1776 ordinance, all legions were disbanded and contributed a new mounted chasseurs company into each regiment of the cavalry, while the infantry components were absorbed into the new infantry garrison battalions. Before 1776 these legions composed of a company of grenadiers, eight companies of fusiliers, and eight companies of dragoons, after the Peace of Versailles the volunteers were reduced to:

Legions (mixed infantry and cavalry)

- (Holy Roman Empire) Légion de Conflans – Disbanded, then reformed in 1778 as the Régiment de Conflans Hussards
- Légion Royale – Disbanded, then reformed in 1778 as the 1er Chasseurs à Cheval
- (Holy Roman Empire) Légion de Flanders
- Légion de Lorraine
- Légion de Condé
- Légion de Soubise
- Légion de Dauphiné

Following the 1776 ordinance, all of the legions' infantry companies converted to infantry chasseurs and were incorporated into every regiment of the army, thereby providing every infantry regiment with a left–wing chasseur company. The cavalry of the legions were themselves also converted to chasseurs, but mounted and dispersed throughout the cavalry, thereby providing every cavalry regiment with a mounted (scouts) squadron.

After the former legions were disbanded, three more were raised (8 were originally planned) from foreign volunteers for service during the Anglo–French War (American Revolutionary War), these included:

- 1er Legion Voluntaires Étrangers de la Marine (la Royal Marine) – Raised for service in the Caribbean, also sent a detachment with the 2nd Legion to Yorktown
- (Holy Roman Empire) 2éme Legion Voluntaires Étrangers de la Marine (Lauzun's) – Raised for service in the Americas, also served in the West Indies
- 3éme Legion Voluntaires Étrangers de la Marine – Raised for service in India and the Second Anglo–Mysore War (most personnel transferred from the Légion Royale)

== Provincial Troops ==
Under the 1776 ordinance, the provincial volunteers were due to be disbanded, but by order of the King this was reduced. The provincial troops were divided into 4 categories: Royal Grenadiers, Infantry, État Major Regiments, and provincial artillery.

=== État Major ===
- 1er Régiment d'État Major (from battalions of Troyes and Chaumont)
- 2éme Régiment d'État Major (from battalions of Moulins and Montluçon)
- 3éme Régiment d'État Major (from battalions of Lille and Valenciennes)
- 4éme Régiment d'État Major (from battalions of Montbrison and Tarare)
- 5éme Régiment d'État Major (from battalions of Privas and Anduze)

=== Grenadiers ===
By ordinance of 30 January 1778, the Corps des Grenaiders Royaux was re–constituted, but were formed as a result of the 1776 ordinance, therefore are presented on this page for convenience. These new regiments were formed by grouped the old garrison battalions' grenadiers companies from regiments of a certain area. The regiments consisted of:

- Régiment des Grenadiers Royaux de la Picardie in Lille, companies from the Régiments de Picardie, Cambrésis, Hainaut, Vermandois, Flandre, Artois, and two companies of the 3éme Régiment de État Major
- Régiment des Grenadiers Royaux de la Champagne in Valenciennes, companies from the Régiments de Brie, Orléans, Neustrie, and La Marine, two companies of the Régiment Provincial d'Artillerie de La Fère, and two companies of the 1er Régiment d'État Major
- Régiment des Grenadiers Royaux de la Normandie in Rouen, companies from the Régiments de Perche, Beauce, Vexin, Normandie, Boulonnais, Dauphin, La Couronne, and Penthièvre
- Régiment des Grenadiers Royaux de la Guyenne in Blaye, companies from the Régiments de Guyenne, Aquitaine, Médoc, Forèz, Bresse, Armagnac, Agénois, and Aunis
- Régiment des Grenadiers Royaux du Lyonnais in Vienne, companies from the Régiments de Auvergne and La Sarre, one company from the Provincial Artillery Regiment of Auxonne and from Artillery Regiment of Grenoble, and 2nd and 4th État Major regiments
- Régiment des Grenadiers Royaux de la Touraine in Saumur, companies from the Régiments de Bourbonnais, Limousin, Touraine, La Reine, Conti, Maine, Anjou, and Rohan
- Régiment des Grenadiers Royaux de l'Île de France in Mantes la Jolie, companies from the Régiments d'Isle de France, Beauvoisis, Royal, Bourgogne, Chartres, and Soissonnais
- Régiment des Grenadiers Royaux de l'Orléanais in Orléans, companies from the Régiments de Blésois, Maréchal de Turrene, Auxerrois, Gâtinais, Bassigny, Bassigny, Berry, Poitou, and Angoumois
- Régiment des Grenadiers Royaux de la Bretagne in Rennes, companies from the Régiments de Bretagne, Monsieur, Royal Vaisseaux, Royal Marine, Savoie Carignan, La Fère, Saintonge, and Foix
- Régiment des Grenadiers Royaux de la Lorrainen in Nancy, companies from the Régiments d'Austrasie, Lorraine, Champagne, and Barrois, and the provincial artillery regiments of Strasbourg and Metz
- Régiment des Grenadiers Royaux du Languedoc in Montpellier, companies from the Régiments de Piémont, Royal Roussillon, Languedoc, Provence, and Dauphiné, and the 5th État Major Regiment and Provincial Artillery Regiment of Grenoble
- Régiment des Grenadiers Royaux du Comte de Bourgogne in Besançon, companies from the Régiments de Condé, Royal Comtois, and Enghien, also the Provincial Artillery Regiments of Besançon and Toul, and a company of the Provincial Artillery Regiment of Auxonne
- Régiment des Grenadiers Royaux du Quercy in Montauban, companies from the Régiments de Viennois, Vivarais, Rouergue, Beaujolais, Lyonnais, Bourbon, Navarre, and Béarn

=== Infantry ===
With the exception of the Régiment de la Ville de Paris, all provincial battalions were assigned to an infantry regiment, becoming their "3rd or Garrison Battalion", except for the Régiment du Roi which had their provincial unit as the 5th and 6th battalions respectively.

- Régiment de la Ville de Paris (from the two battalions of Paris)
- Bataillon d'Amiens (attached to Régiment de Picardie)
- 1er Bataillon d'Aix (attached to Régiment de Provence)
- Bataillon de Blois (attached to Régiment de Provence)
- Bataillon d'Auch (attached to Régiment de Navarre)
- Bataillon de Marmande (attached to Régiment d'Armagnac)
- Bataillon de Bar le Duc (attached to Régiment de Champagne)
- Bataillon de Nancy (attached to Régiment d'Austrasie)
- Bataillon de Rouen (attached to Régiment de Normandie)
- Bataillon de Pont Audemer (attached to Régiment de Neustrie)
- Bataillon de Neuchâtel (attached to Régiment de La Marine)
- Bataillon de Chartres (attached to Régiment d'Auxerrois)
- Bataillon de Limoges (attached to Régiment de Bourbonnais)
- Bataillon de Périgueux (attached to Régiment de Forèz)
- Bataillon de Saint Gaudens (attached to Régiment de Béarn)
- Bataillon de Libourne (attached to Régiment d'Agenois)
- Bataillon de Clermont (attached to Régiment d'Auvergne)
- Bataillon de Montargis (attached to Régiment de Gâtinais)
- 1er Bataillon d'Arras (attached to Régiment de Flandre)
- Bataillon de Péronne (attached to Régiment de Cambrésis)
- Bataillon de Nérac (attached to Régiment de Guyenne)
- Bataillon d'Albi (attached to Régiment de Viennois)
- Bataillon de Senlis (attached to Régiment du Roi)
- Bataillon de Mantes (attached to Régiment du Roi)
- Bataillon de Joigny (attached to Régiment Royal)
- Bataillon de Laon (attached to Régiment de Brie)
- Bataillon de Poitiers (attached to Régiment de Poitou)
- Bataillon de Bergerac (attached to Régiment de Bresse)
- Bataillon de Rodèz (attached to Régiment de Lyonnais)
- Bataillon du Mans (attached to Régiment de Maine)
- Bataillon de Caen (attached to Régiment du Dauphin)
- Bataillon d'Alençon (attached to Régiment de Perche)
- Bataillon de Saint Jean d'Angély (attached to Régiment d'Aunis)
- Bataillon de Bourges (attached to Régiment de Bassigny)
- Bataillon de Tours (attached to Régiment de Touraine)
- Bataillon de Vannes (attached to Régiment de Savoie Carignan)
- Bataillon de Villeneuve d'Agen (attached to Régiment de Aquitaine)
- Bataillon de Mayenne (attached to Régiment d'Anjou)
- Bataillon d'Orléans (attached to Régiment de Maréchal de Turenne)
- 2éme Bataillon d'Aix (attached to Régiment de Dauphiné)
- Bataillon de Saint Denis (attached to Régiment de Isle de France)
- Bataillon de Soissons (attached to Régiment de Soissons)
- Bataillon de Saumur (attached to Régiment de La Reine)
- Bataillon d'Angoulême (attached to Régiment de Lomousin)
- Bataillon de Nantes (attached to Régiment Royal Vaisseaux)
- Bataillon de Noyon (attached to Régiment de Orléans)
- Bataillon de Saint Lô (attached to Régiment de La Couronne)
- Bataillon de Rennes (attached to Régiment de Bretagne)
- Bataillon de Sarreguemines (attached to Régiment de Lorraine)
- 2éme Bataillon d'Arras (attached to Régiment d'Artois)
- Bataillon de Châteauroux (attached to Régiment de Berry)
- Bataillon d'Abbeville (attached to Régiment de Hainaut)
- Bataillon de Brioude (attached to Régiment Royal Roussillon)
- Bataillon de Salins (attached to Régiment de Condé)
- Bataillon de Millau (attached to Régiment de Bourbon)
- Bataillon de Beauvais (attached to Régiment de Beauvoisi)
- Bataillon de Figeac (attached to Régiment de Rouergue)
- Bataillon de Provins (attached to Régiment de Bourgogne)
- Bataillon de Redon (attached to Régiment Royal Marine)
- Bataillon de Gisors (attached to Régiment de Vermandois)
- Bataillon de Carcassonne (attached to Régiment de Languedoc)
- Bataillon de Mortagne (attached to Régiment de Beauce)
- Bataillon de Saint Sever (attached to Régiment de Médoc)
- Bataillon de Castelnaudary (attached to Régiment de Vivarais)
- Bataillon d'Argentan (attached to Régiment de Vexin)
- Bataillon de Dôle (attached to Régiment Royal Comtois)
- Bataillon de Cahors (attached to Régiment de Beaujolais)
- Bataillon de Dinan (attached to Régiment de Monsieur)
- Bataillon de Vire (attached to Régiment de Penthièvre)
- Bataillon de Vernoy (attached to Régiment de Boulonnais)
- Bataillon de Saint Maixent (attached to Régiment d'Angoumois)
- Bataillon d'Angers (attached to Régiment de Conti)
- Bataillon de Fontenay (attached to Régiment de Saintonge)
- Bataillon de Parthenay (attached to Régiment de Foix)
- Bataillon de Falaise (attached to Régiment de Rohan)
- Bataillon de Corbeil (attached to Régiment de Chartres)
- Bataillon d'Étain (attached to Régiment de Barrois)
- Bataillon de Lons le Saunier (attached to Régiment d'Enghien)

=== Artillery ===
New regiments and their predecessor battalions shown in order of precedence.

- Régiment Provincial d'Artillerie de La Fère (from battalions of Châlons and Saint Dizier)
- Régiment Provincial d'Artillerie de Metz (from battalions of Metz and Verdun)
- Régiment Provincial d'Artillerie de Besançon (from battalions of Dijon and Semur en Auxois)
- Régiment Provincial d'Artillerie de Grenoble (from battalions of Velence and Romans)
- Régiment Provincial d'Artillerie de Strasbourg (from battalions of Strasbourg and Colmar)
- Régiment Provincial d'Artillerie d'Auxonne (from battalions of Châlons and Autun)
- Régiment Provincial d'Artillerie de Toul (from battalions of Vesoul and Ornans)

== Artillery ==
In 1776 the French artillery consisted of 7 regiments, of which all held the number 64 in regimental precedence.

- Régiment de La Fère
- Régiment de Metz
- Régiment de Besançon
- Régiment de Grenoble
- Régiment de Strasbourg
- Régiment d'Auxonne
- Régiment de Toul
- Battalion d'Ingénieures – forms part of the Royal Corps of Artillery

== Admiralty ==
Until 1890, all colonial affairs were controlled by the Secretary of State of the Navy (known as the Admiralty) (Secrétaire d'État à la Marine), though the below regiments were part of the French Royal Army. They are only shown under the Admiralty as they were under the operational command of the organisation, not the administrative.

=== Colonial Regiments ===
- Régiment du Cap – Saint Domingue
- Régiment de Port au Prince – Saint Domingue
- Régiment de Martinique – Antilles
- Régiment de Guadeloupe – Antilles
- Régiment d'Île de France – Indian Ocean
- Régiment d'Île de Bourbon – Indian Ocean
- Régiment de Pondichéry – French India
