= 4e régiment de hussards =

4e régiment de hussards or 4th Hussar Regiment may refer to one of two regiments in the French Army:

- The Régiment de Saxe Hussards, the original 4th Hussar Regiment, removed from the French regimental list after they defected to the counter-revolutionary forces
- 4th Hussar Regiment, created as the hussards Colonel Général, originally numbered 5th Hussar Regiment, promoted to 4th on the defection of the Hussards de Saxe
