= Hompesch Hussars =

Hompesch's Hussars
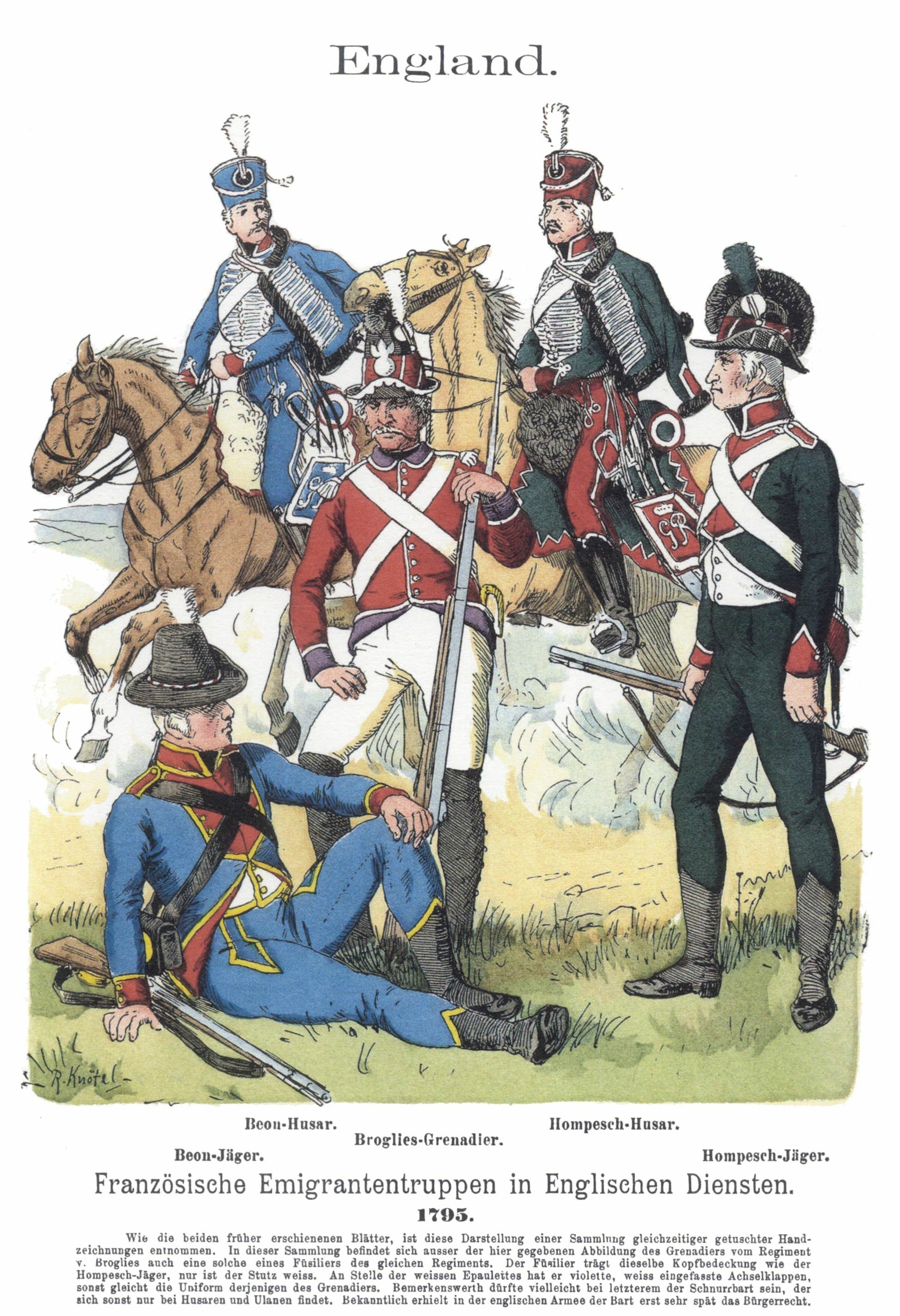
- A trooper of the Hompesch Hussars (second from right)
- Active: 27 February 1794 – October 1797
- Country: French Emigres
- Branch: Armée des Émigrés
- Type: Light Cavalry
- Size: Regiment
- Part of: (Kingdom of Great Britain) British Army: Hompesch's Legion
- Garrison/HQ: Yarmouth Castle, Isle of Wight
- Engagements: French Revolutionary War; Flanders Campaign; Rhine Campaign; Haitian Revolution

The Hompesch Hussars (German: Hompesch Husarenregiment, French: Régiment des Hussards de Hompesch) was a German light cavalry regiment of the French Armée des Émigrés raised by the Freiherr von Hompesch. The regiment was raised in 1794 following an expansion of the British foreign corps, and served in the Flanders campaign, notably at the Battle of Boxtel. However, following the unsuccessful attempt to overthrow the Republican government, the regiment was deployed to the West Indies instead of a planned deployment to Western France. They were slowly destroyed in the West Indies by disease and fever and finally disbanded in October 1797.

== Formation ==
In the spring 1794, the British War Office ordered the formation of several new units within the Holy Roman Empire, notably within Hanover and Swabia. That year, Charles, Freiherr von Hompesch, signed a capitulation with the British government in which he would organise a legion, later known as Hompesch's Legion. The new group would be composed of the following: one Hussar Regiment of three squadrons and two mounted chasseurs (rifles) were attached totalling 913 in all ranks. The second unit was an infantry battalion of six companies and 801 of all ranks.

By the end of 1794, the new legion was formed, with its mounted element becoming the Hompesch Hussars. The new regiment was composed of three squadrons of three troops of 3 officers and 81 other ranks each. The horses were Polish or Hungarian, and the uniform comprised a green pelisse and green dolman with a red collar and red breeches, and was surmounted by a red hussar cap with a white plume. The new regiment was raised at Schwarm and most of its original rank and file with three-quarters of its officers being émigrés, the rest being German. The regiment wore the badge of the Prince of Wales, George August Frederick.

In just two weeks, Hompesch had gathered some 300 troops to fight in his name. The majority of the officers were formerly part of the French Royal Army and mostly came from the Corps of Chasseurs (Corps de Chasseurs). The remainder were French counter-revolutionaries, Germans mostly from the Hanover, and Flemings from the Austrian Netherlands.

== Flanders campaign ==
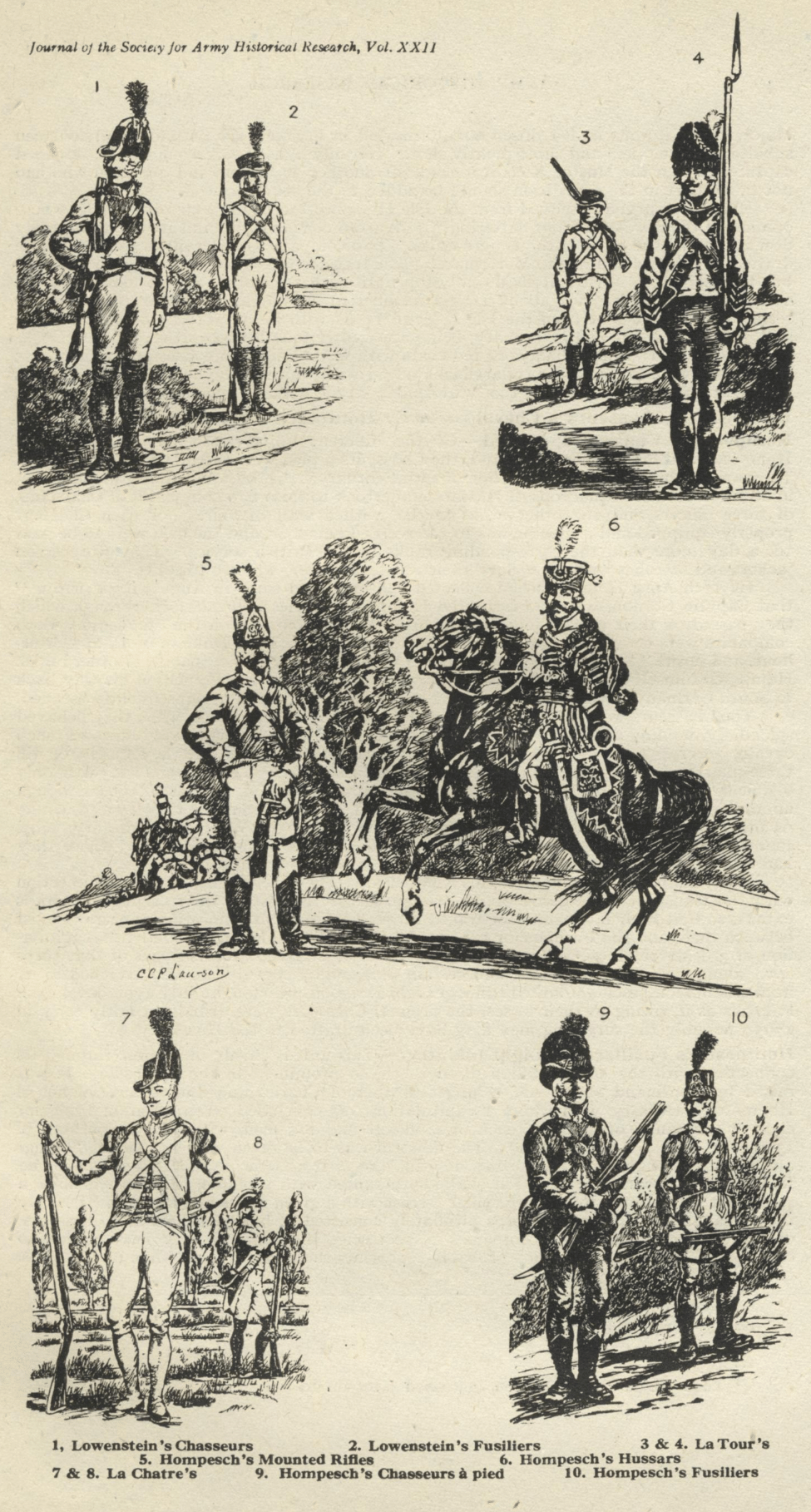
Uniform variations of the Lowenstein, La Tour, and Hompesch Legions/Regiments in 1794/1795

By early 1795, Prince Frederick, Duke of York and Albany had joined the Austrian Army of the Netherlands in Wallonia, in preparation for his planned Invasion of France. The Duke therefore, as Prince-Bishop of Osnabrück, ordered the newly formed émigré forces into Flanders. First the Uhlans Britanniques and Rohan's Light Infantry (Rohan's Legion) arrived, and later Choiseul's Hussars and Salm's Hussars. The Hompesch Hussars arrived last and were in a less favourable position than the other units. By 1 September 1794, the Hompesch Hussars, Ramsay's Hussars, and Rohan's Hussars returned 1,000 fit and present, but were 250 short.

On 14 September 1794, British command received despatches reporting an attack by the majority of the French Army of the North under Général de Division Jean-Charles Pichegru. The Duke of York immediately sent reinforcements to Generalmajor Baron von Dalwigk's position in Boxtel. The following day, the Hompesch Hussars with two squadrons, Hompesch Chasseurs with two Companies, and Irwin's York Hussars with two Squadrons arrived, along with 4 light guns. When the revolutionary French charged the Hessian positions, the Hompesch Chasseurs and Hussars held their post "magnificently", hanging on after the entirety of the Hessian brigade was routed. During this small engagements, 204 émigrés were killed (none were taken prisoners: the Republicans killed all), and lost their four guns. However, both the Hessians and advancing British gave the Hompesch troops praise for their tenacity, though this came at a cost of 120 casualties among 160 present.

By 1 December 1794, about a dozen foreign corps were in the field, of which the six mounted corps present on 1 September mustered 3,000 officers and men against establishments of nearly 5,000.

== Quiberon ==
By early 1795, the Royalist Émigrés planned a two prong attack into the French mainland. From the west, a British Fleet would transport a large émigré force to Brittany and land at Quiberon Bay with a plan of uniting with the Catholic and Royal Armies, which had already begun the first phase with the War in the Vendée in 1793. However, throughout the campaign, a mix of miscommunication and lack of loyal émigré soldiers led to a total breakdown of communication. By 11 July Hompesch's and Salm's Hussars were still based in Flanders and the desertion rate soared after news arrived that the regiment would be embarking shortly. On 10 October, the regiment's strength was at 39 officers and 772 other ranks. With news of the initial invasion being a failure, the regiment was instead sent to the West Indies, which would become known as the graveyard of the British Foreign Corps.

== West Indies ==
By late 1796, the Foreign Corps was embarked for the West Indies with the Cavalry going to Saint-Domingue, and the infantry going to the smaller islands. By 1 June 1797, the Hompesch Hussars numbered just 39 officers and 340 men, but by 1 July had shrunk to 36 officers and 318 other ranks. A detachment appears to have been sent to Guernsey and helped form the short-lived Guernsey Hussars.

By October 1797, the regiment returned to Europe and was based at Yarmouth Castle on the Isle of Wight where it was finally disbanded.

== See also ==
- Invasion of Quiberon

== General references ==
- Atkinson, C. T. (Winter 1942). "Foreign Regiments in the British Army, 1793–1802: Vol. I – General Overview". Journal of the Society for Army Historical Research. XXI (84). Society for Army Historical Research. JSTOR 44219934.
- Chartrand, René (1999). Émigré & Foreign Troops in British Service. Men-at-Arms. Vol. I: 1793–1802. Botley, Oxfordshire, United Kingdom: Osprey Publishing. ISBN 978-1472807205. OCLC 1021804719.
- Smith, Digby (2006). An Illustrated Encyclopedia of Uniforms of the Napoleonic Wars: An Expert, In-Depth Reference to the Officers and Soldiers of the Revolutionary and Napoleonic Period, 1792–1815. London Lanham, Md: Lorenz North American agent/distributor, National Book Network. ISBN 978-0-7548-1571-6. OCLC 60320422.

== Sources ==
- Atkinson, C. T. (1943a) [Spring 1943]. "Foreign Regiments in the British Army, 1793–1802: Vol. II – The Continent". Journal of the Society for Army Historical Research. XXII (85). Society for Army Historical Research. JSTOR 44219955.
- Atkinson, C. T. (1943b) [Autumn 1943]. "Foreign Regiments in the British Army, 1793–1802: Vol. IV – The West Indies". Journal of the Society for Army Historical Research. XXII (87). Society for Army Historical Research. JSTOR 44230405.
- Atkinson, C. T. (Summer 1944). "Foreign Regiments in the British Army, 1793–1802: Vol. VI – Notes on Each Corps or Regiment, Section II – du Dresnay's to MacLean's Chasseurs". Journal of the Society for Army Historical Research. XXII (90). Society for Army Historical Research. JSTOR 44219980.
- Brown, Steve (March 2014). "'Every Species of Foreigner': Britain's Foreign Regiments 1793–1796". napoleon-series.org. Archived from the original on 2021-01-29.
- Smith, Digby (1998). The Greenhill Napoleonic Wars Data Book. London Mechanicsburg, PA: Greenhill Books Stackpole Books. ISBN 978-1-85367-276-7. OCLC 37616149.
