= Jean Chrétien Fischer =

Jean Chrétien Fischer (German: Johann Christian Fischer; 17 January 1713 in Stuttgart – 1 July 1762 near Kassel) was a German-born soldier in the French service.

== Biography ==
He was a leader of the partisans in the French Army during the War of the Austrian Succession. In 1743, he was authorized by the Marshal de Belle-Isle to raise a company, which was called the Chasseurs de Fischer, the origin of that branch in the French Army. He distinguished himself in the Seven Years' War; was made brigadier for his bravery at Arloff (1759); added to his fame at the Battle of Clostercamp (1760); resigned his command to the Marquis de Conflans (1761), but still fought in his old troop with the rank of a lieutenant-colonel.
