= Steiner Infantry Regiment =

Former Swiss regiment in French service

Régiment de Lochmann Régiment de Muralt Régiment de Steiner
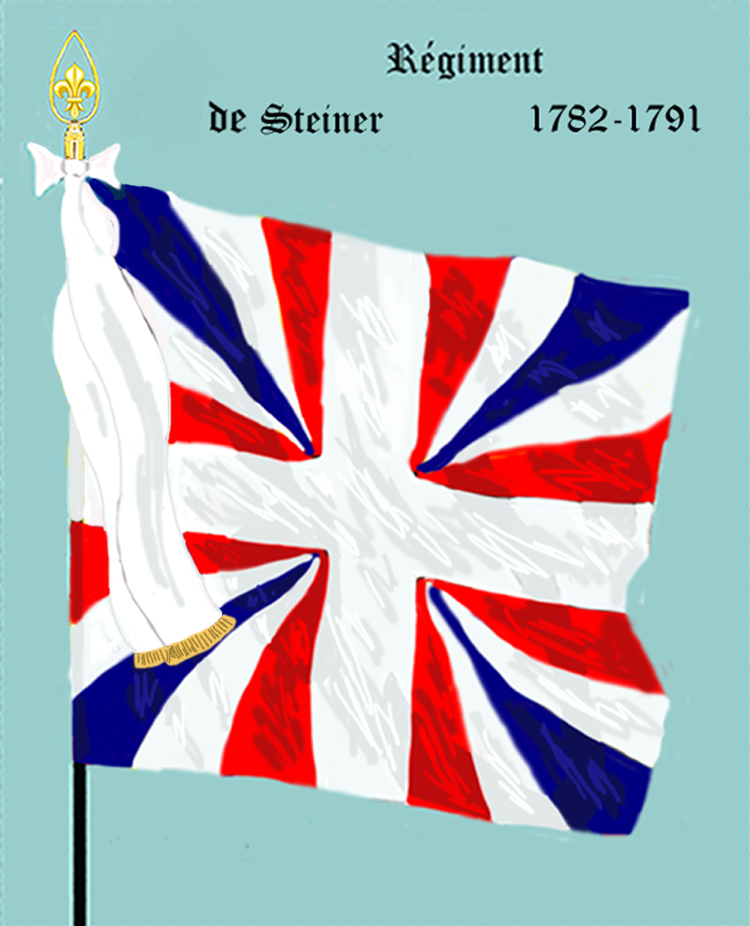
- Longest held regimental colours of the Steiner regiment.
- Active: 1752–1792
- Country: Kingdom of France
- Branch: (Kingdom of France) French Royal Army
- Type: Line Infantry
- Size: Battalion (Note: Swiss regiments only had one battalion.)
- Part of: Swiss Corps
- Depot: Belfort
- Colors: 'Swiss red' tunic and dark blue facings
- Engagements: Seven Years' War; French Revolutionary Wars

The Régiment de Steiner (British English: Steiner's Regiment) was a line infantry unit of the French Royal Army, and later briefly served under the French First Republic until its disbanded in 1792 following the revolution. The regiment was one of just a few Swiss regiments remaining in the later 18th century, but its successor, the 97th Infantry Regiment would see service throughout the French Revolutionary Wars, but not the Napoleonic Wars, however it was reformed and finally disbanded after the Battle of France.

== Formation ==
On 1 March 1752, the Régiment de Lochmann was formed in the Canton of Zürich by order of the local governor. Under this order, "A regiment is to be raised in the Canton of Zürich, of which this Swiss regiment is to be led by the Baron Lochmann". Shortly thereafter, the regiment was commissioned to contain twelve companies, of 120 men each. This new regiment became 117th in precedence. The first uniform consisted of a black tricorn with white trim and a black cockade, red tunic with silver buttons, red with black trimmed epaulettes, button flaps, dark blue small coat, turnbacks, and trousers, and long silver button lace on the small coat.

== Seven Years' War ==
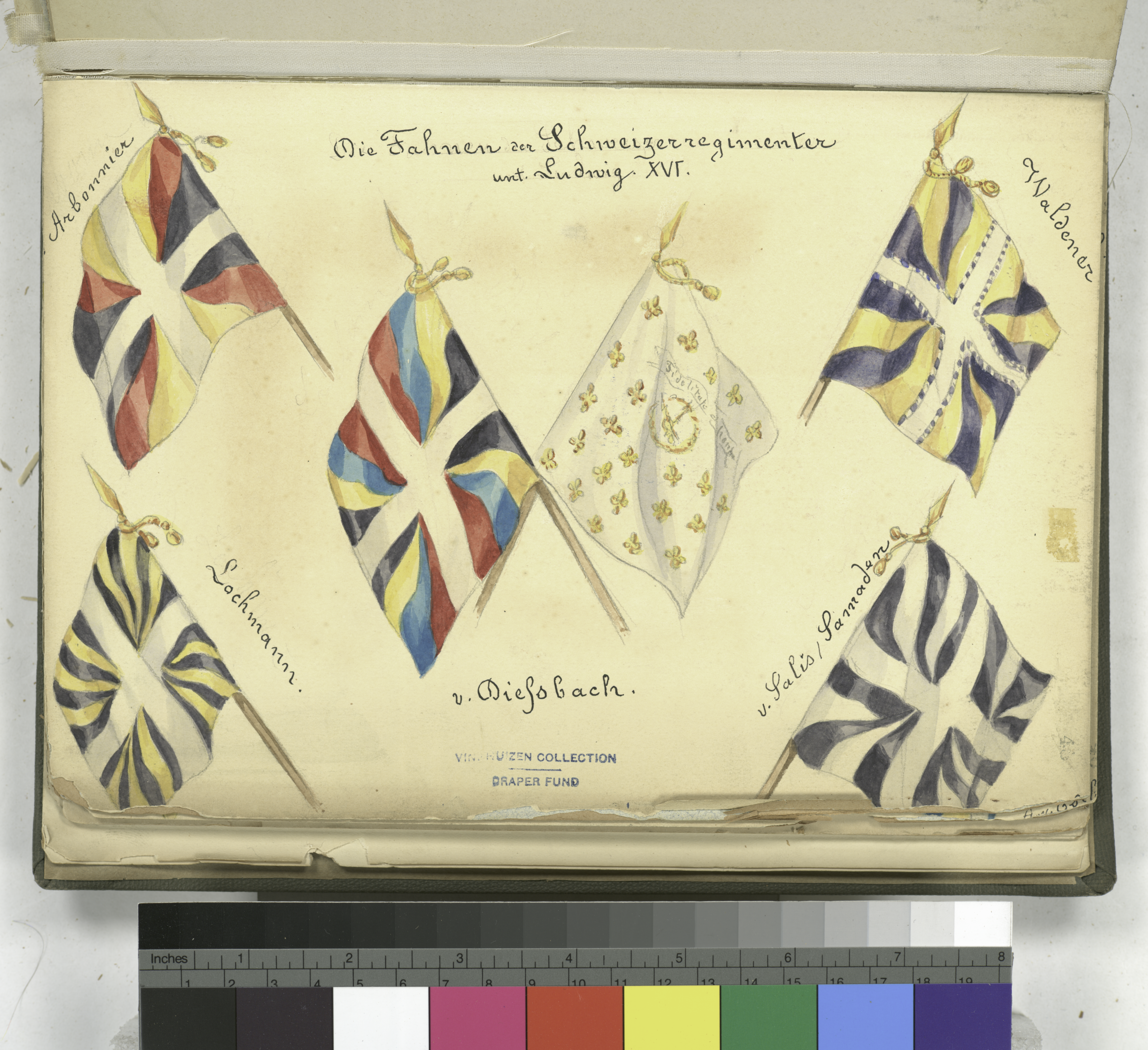
Regimental colours along with other Swiss regimental colours (bottom left corner) is that of the Steiner regiment.

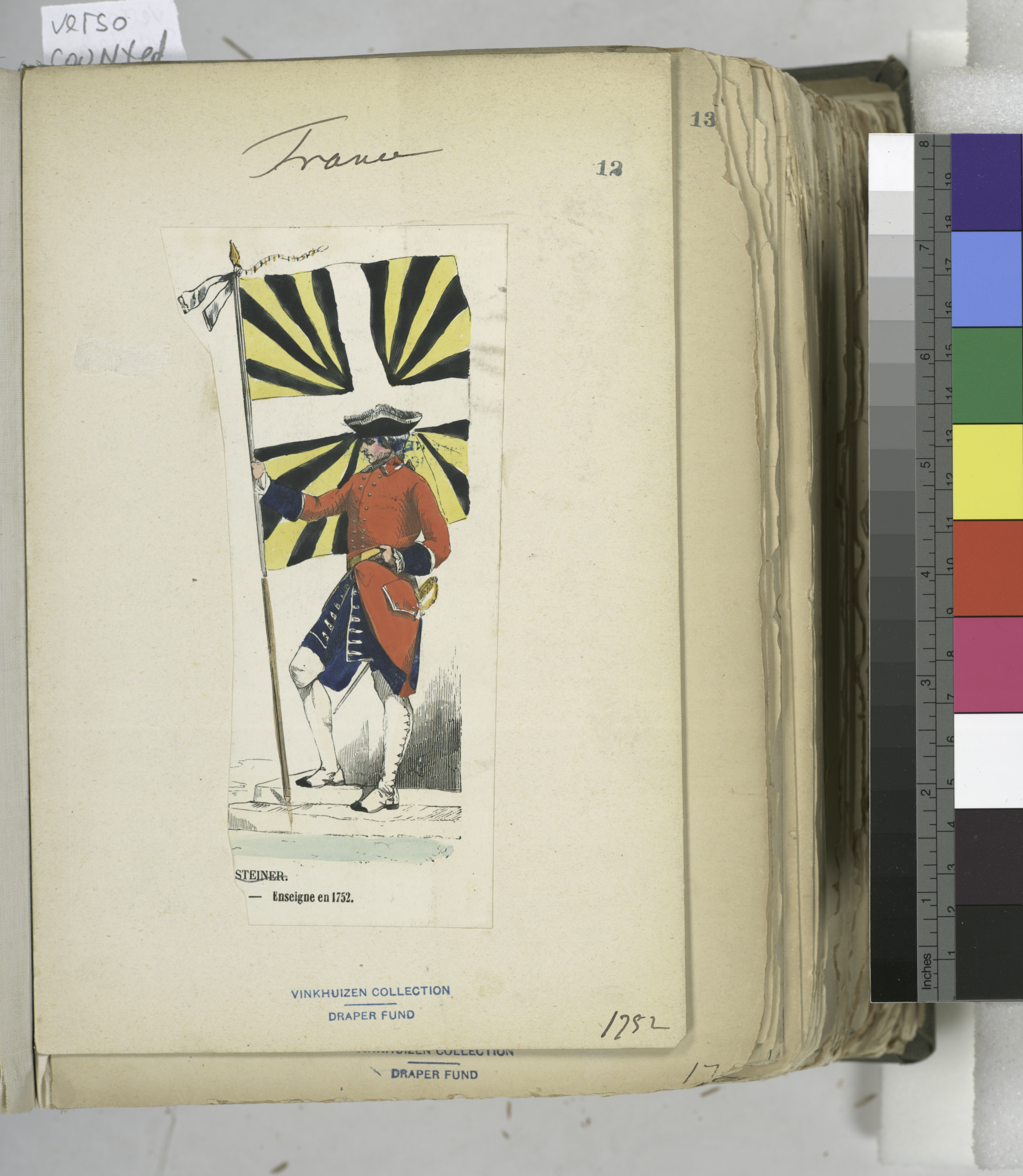
Uniform and colours of the regiment in 1752, just after formation.

In 1755, the regiment was based at the camp in Richemont, and in 1757 was attached to the Armée d'Allemagne (Army of Germany). It was at this point where the regiment was given their first standardised uniform, which consisted of the following; 'Swiss red' collars, tunic, epaulettes, and pockets, teal trousers, turnbacks, cuffs, and jacket braid, white buttons, white best and braid, and black bicorne with white trim.

=== Hanover Campaign ===
The regiment then saw its first action at the Battle of Haastembeck, where it was the first engaged, and took part in all subsequent battles during the Hanover Campaign. In early 1758, the regiment moved back across the Rhine, and was tasked with guarding the passes across the river. On 23 June 1758, the regiment was involved in the Battle of Krefeld, and in 1759 rose to great prominence during the Battle of Minden.

=== 1760 Campaign ===
During the 1760 campaign, the regiment gained much fame, notably during the Battle of Corbach and Battle of Warbourg. On 31 July, at Warbourg, the regiment fought with admirable vigour, and supported the Régiment de Jenner, against relentless attacks by the Allies. Because of their stand, the two regiments were able to delay the allies enough to cover the rest of the French Army's retreat. At the end of the battle, Colonel Lochmann was wounded and captured by the enemy.

In 1761 and 1762, the regiment would see further service in Germany, and at the end of the war in 1763 was based in Gelderland in the Dutch Republic. In 1762, a massive reorganisation of the French Army occurred as a direct result of their failure in the Seven Years' War, including a complete revamp of the uniform system. Under this experimental program, regiments were grouped into divisions for an easier uniform system. The Swiss regiments however were exempt from this programme, though the uniform was changed. The new uniform therefore became: 'Swiss red' tunic and facings, teal collars and lapels, black trimmed red epaulettes, pockets, and trim, and white small coat (no buttons), turnbacks, and trousers.

== Peacetime ==
Grenadier of the Steiner regiment in the new 1776 uniform, and wearing a bearskin. Under the 1779 changes, the bearskin was removed, however many regiments kept them, as the new look was un-appealing to many of the grenadiers.

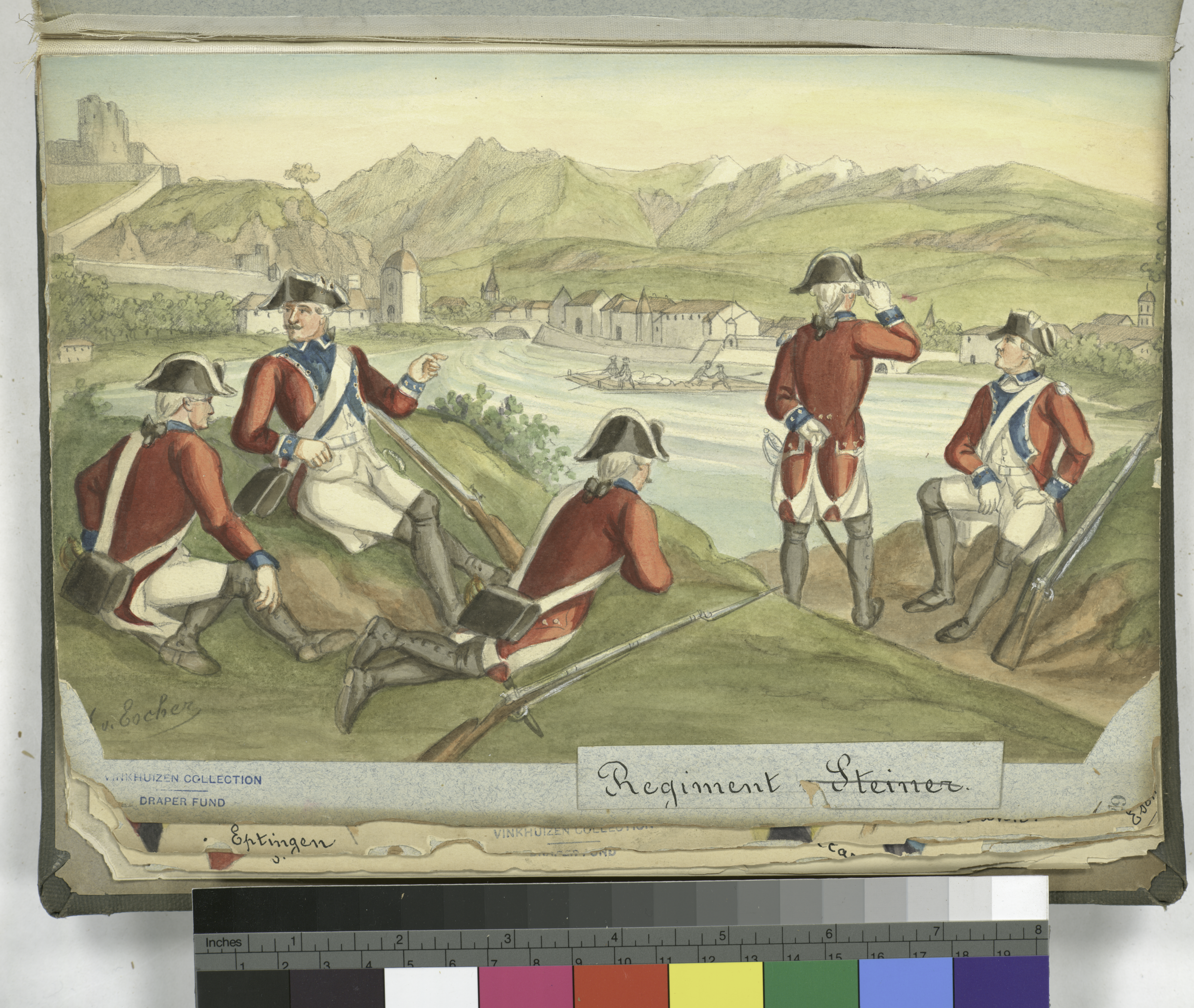
Soldiers and an officer of the regiment taking a break while stationed in the Alps.

After returning to France after the end of the disastrous German campaigns, the regiment was based in Mézières in the Canton of Vaud, Swiss Confederation, from where it then passed to Thionville in May 1763, Valenciennes in May 1763, Bélfort in September 1764, Landau in September 1766, Bitche in June 1767, and Strasbourg in November 1767. The regiment then joined the Verberie camp in 1769, and in August the regiment was separated, with the majority moving to Maubeuge, while small detachment moved to Mézières and Rocroi, but in June 1771, when it grouped back together. In 1772, the regiment moved back to Mézières, to Bitche in April 1774, and to Huningue in October 1775. It was in this town that the regiment's new Colonel arrived, the Baron de Muralt, and the regiment was subsequently renamed as the Régiment de Muralt.

On 2 September 1775 another ordnance was published in which the uniforms changed to the following: black tricorne with white trim and a white cockade, 'Swiss red' tunic and facings, dark blue collars, lapels, and pocket trim, white small coat (no pockets), and white pants.

The next year, another wide-ranging reform saw an expansion of the army, and a new uniform ordnance was published at the same time, on 21 May 1776. The regiment's new uniform now consisted of the following: black tricorne with grey tricorne trim and cockade, 'Swiss red' tunic, bright orange collars, dark (deep) blue lapels, facings, and pockets, white small coat (no buttons) and pants.

The regiment then passed to Strasbourg in November 1777, and to Phalsbourg in April 1778, and set out for Toulon later that year, where it arrived in November. Eventually the regiment embarked for Corsica where it arrived on 11 June 1779, and would remained for a five-year garrison. It was here when in 1782 the regiment's new colonel, the Baron de Steiner arrived, and the regiment was subsequently renamed as the Régiment de Steiner.

In 1779, another uniform change occurred which utilised the new 'Prussian Style' uniform. On 21 February 1779, a sequel ordnance was published on 21 February 1779, and the uniform changed to the following: black bicorne, white bourbon cockade with white plume, 'Swiss red' tunic, dark blue collars, facings, lapels, pocket trim, and epaulette trim, white small coat (no buttons), turnbacks (with a dark blue fleur-de-lis), and pants.

== Revolutionary Period ==
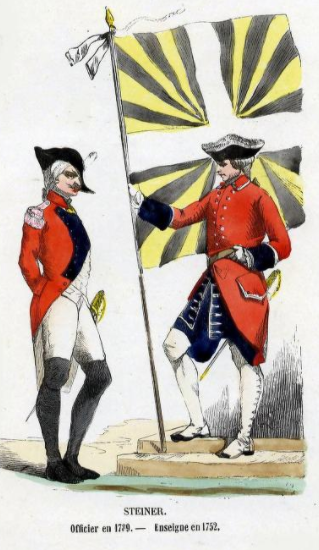
Uniform variations of the regiment, from formation in 1752 (right) to latest in 1789 (left).

On 16 May 1784, the regiment arrived in Toulon, where it was directed to Béziers in July, and from there went to Besançon in May 1788, and to Grenoble the following July. The regiment then spent the following three years in Grenoble, and towards the end of 1791 the regiment detached a few companies from Carpentras during the troubles following an election to join France in the former Papal enclave of Comtat–Venaissin.

Following the revolution, new 'republican style' uniforms were implemented, with the foreign troops having their ordnance on 15 June 1792, though the regiment's uniform was changed very slightly, only losing their fleur-de-lis, and gaining a white over blue bottom small coat, red facings, dark blue turnbacks, and a green plume in the bicorne.

The regiment was then reunited in Lyon in March 1792, and from there moved north to join the Army of the Rhine, which surrendered just before their arrival. It was here in Hochfelden camp where the regiment was disbanded with 500 men remaining, of which some 300 men remained in France, of which almost all joined the cavalry corps. The remainder of the regiment were disarmed and marched into Zurich with full honours where they were disbanded.

== Legal status and privileges ==
The officers and men of the regiment did not owe personal allegiance to the King of France; only to the colonel-proprietor, who also signed the officers' commissions. The colonel-proprietor had entered a capitulation with the King, through the Secretary of War, in which he put the regiment, its officers and men, into French service. It was the colonel-proprietor that had promised collective fidelity for himself and his regiment to the King. The capitulation was a legal contract, renewable every ten years, where the terms of both parties were carefully stipulated. As a foreign regiment, the regiment enjoyed a number of privileges. Liberty of conscience was guaranteed, which meant that Protestants could be recruited; Protestant officers and men were not obliged to participate in Catholic ceremonies. The regiment had its own legal jurisdiction, and its members could only be tried by its own court-martial, even when being accused of crimes against civilians. The privileges of the regiment often triggered conflicts with local military and civilian authorities.

== Uniform ==
Uniform gallery:

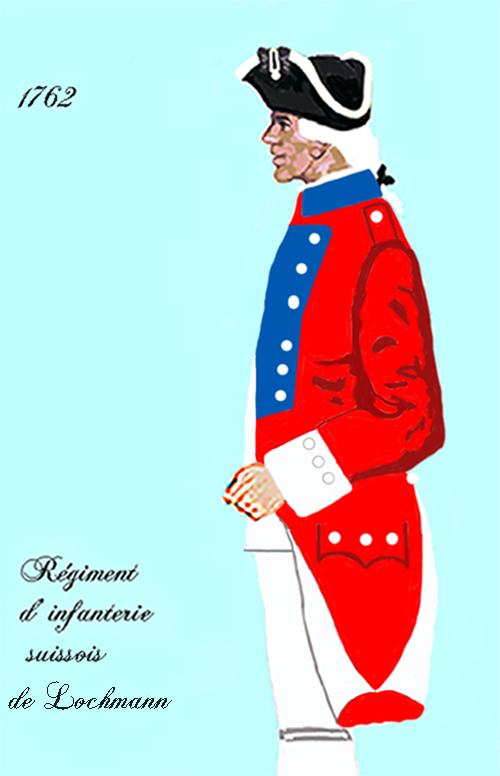
Uniform the regiment in 1762 showing the old dark blue facings and white cuffs.

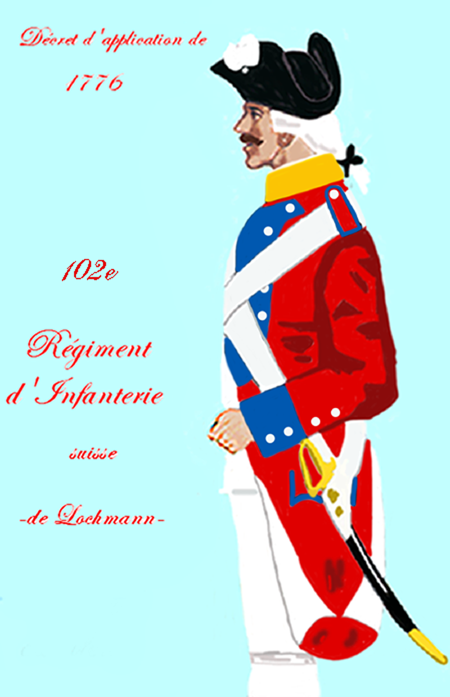
Uniform of the regiment after the 1776 ordnance, now with dark blue facings, cuffs, pocket trim, and epaulette trim. The new

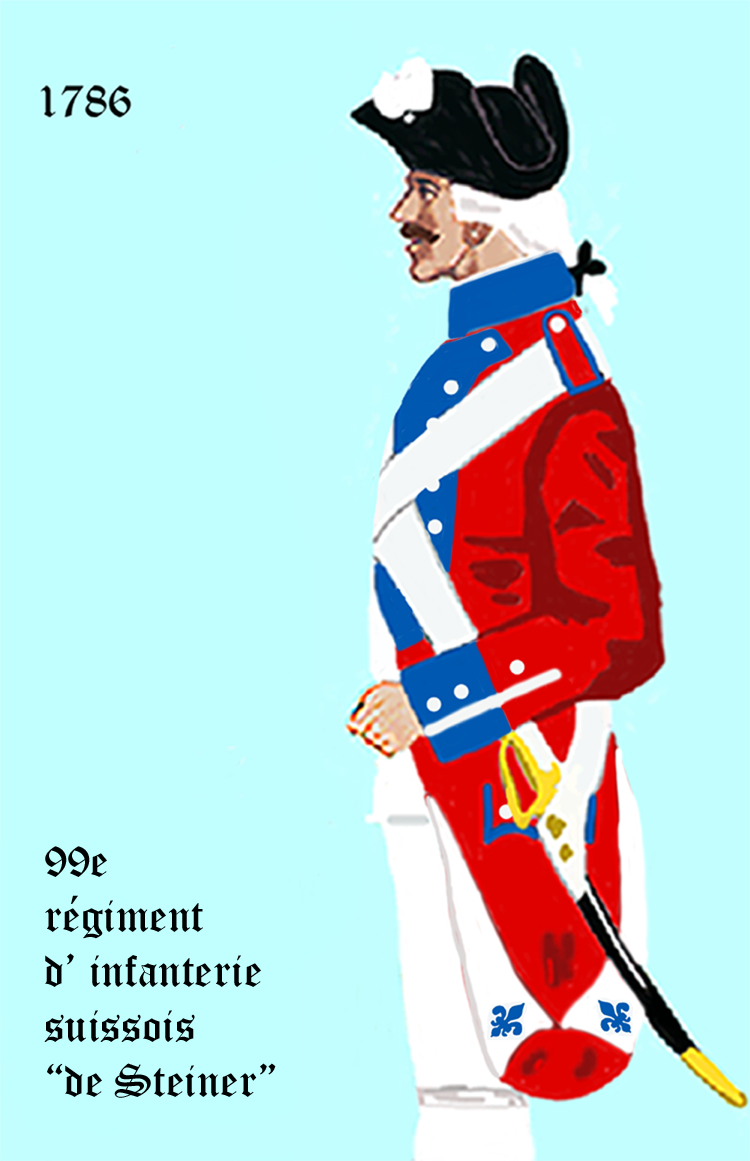
Uniform of the regiment in 1786, now with full dark blue colouring throughout the uniform.

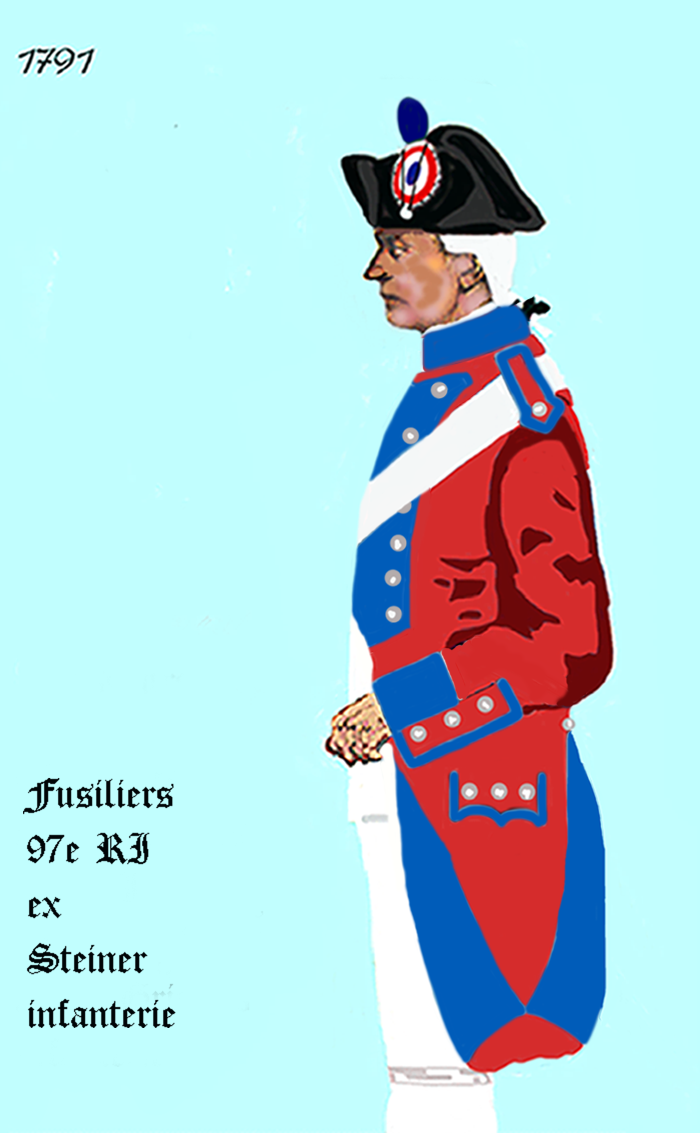
The new more republican-forward uniform with even more dark blue, this uniform was kept for less than a year.

== Colours ==
A typical regiment consisted of (until 1791) two colours; Regimental Colours Drapeau d'Ordonnance and the Colonel's Colours Drapeau de Colonel, which the later normally consisted of the bourbon flag (pure white) with a light grey trimmed cross imposed throughout. Because Swiss regiments were foreign, they didn't follow the bourbon rules, and therefore had separate colours.

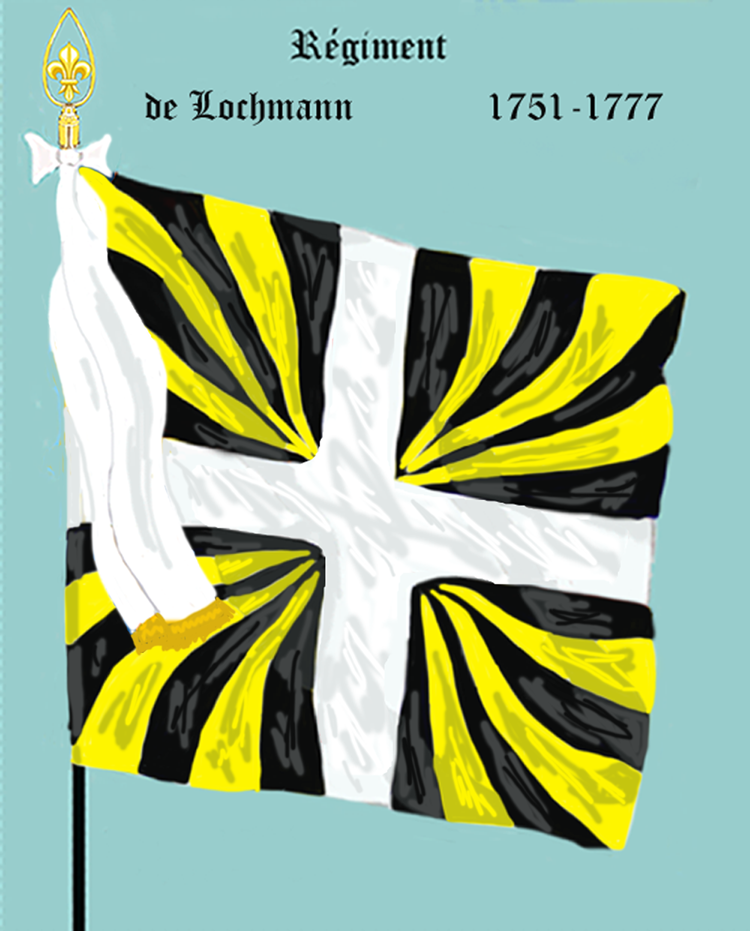
Regimental colours between 1751 and 1777.

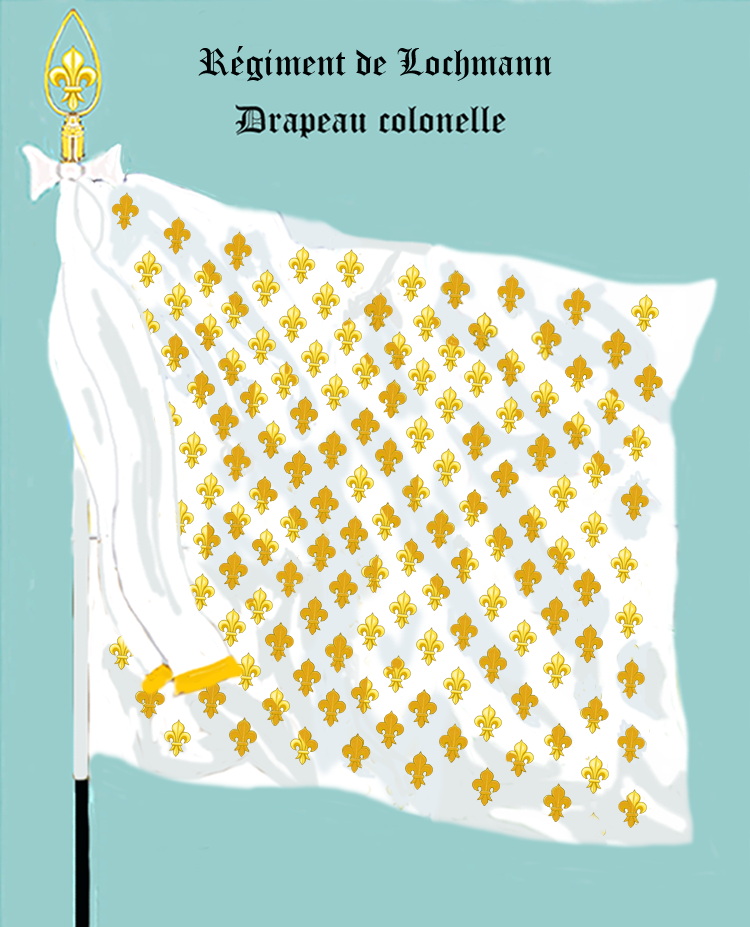
Colonel's colour, a simple white bourbon flag with fleur-de-lis throughout.

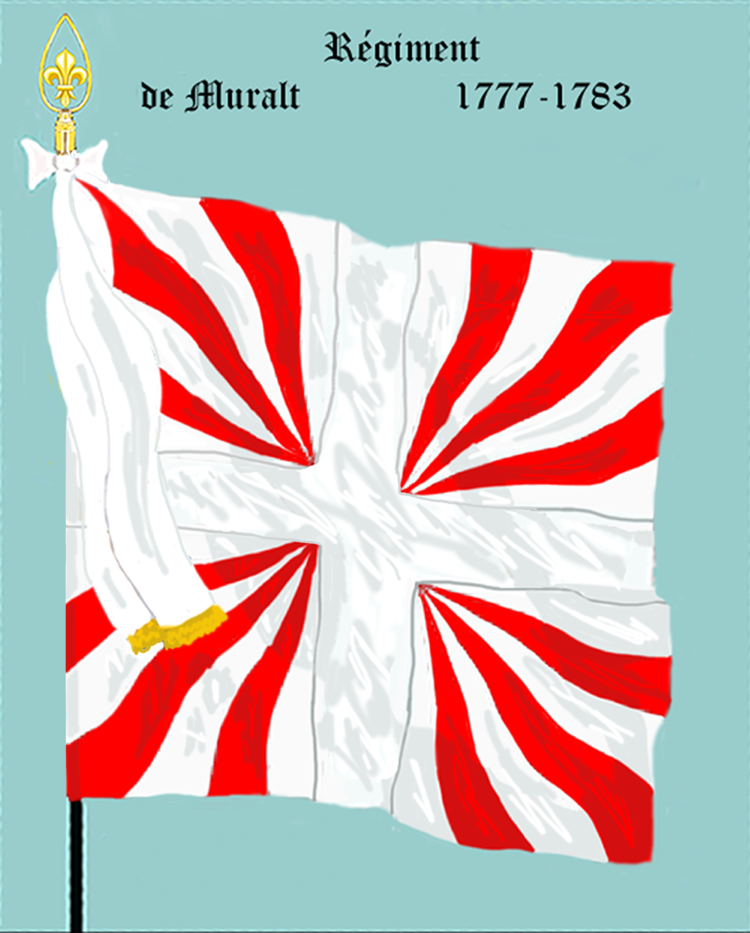
Regimental colours following their redesignation, the flag remained for only 6 years, from 1777 to 1783.

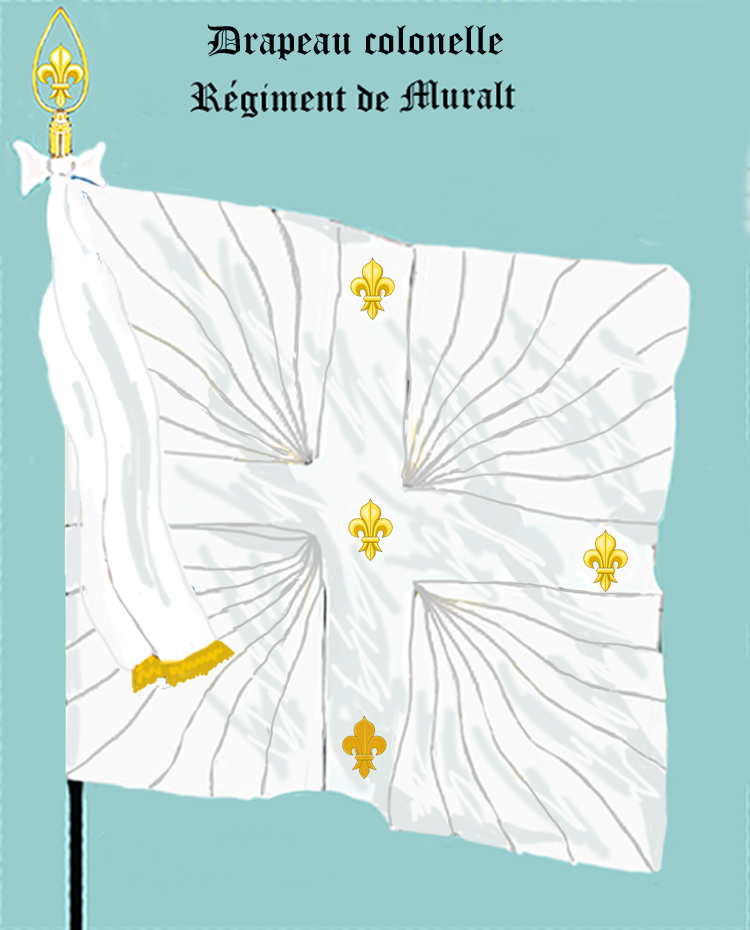
Colonel's colours of the regiment following its redesignation, a simple white bourbon flag with 5 x Fleur-de-lis

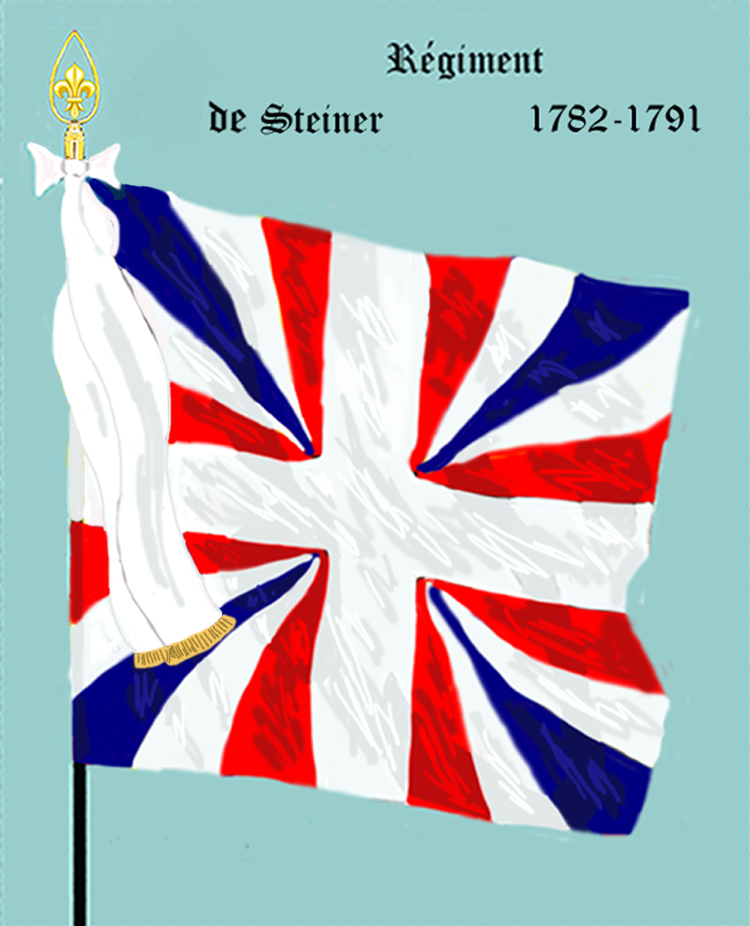
The final regimental flag, which was given in 1782 and removed in 1791 when the regimental colours were removed.

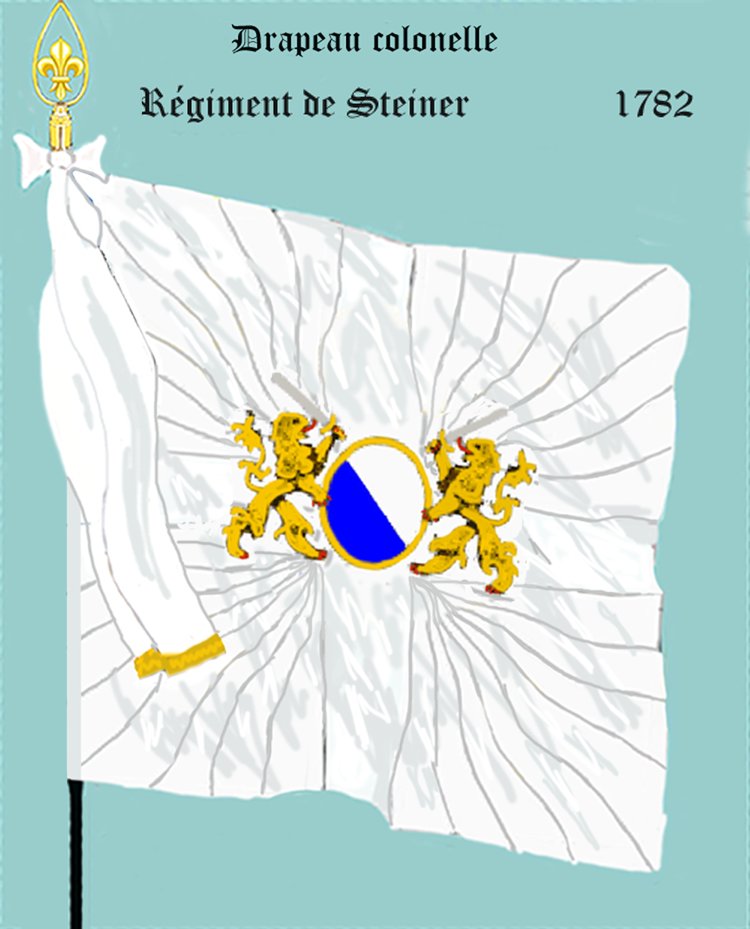
The final colonel's flag, which was given in 1782 and removed in 1791 when the colonel's colours were removed. Again, the simple white bourbon flag with two lions rampant on either side of the Zurich flag embroidered in a gold circle.

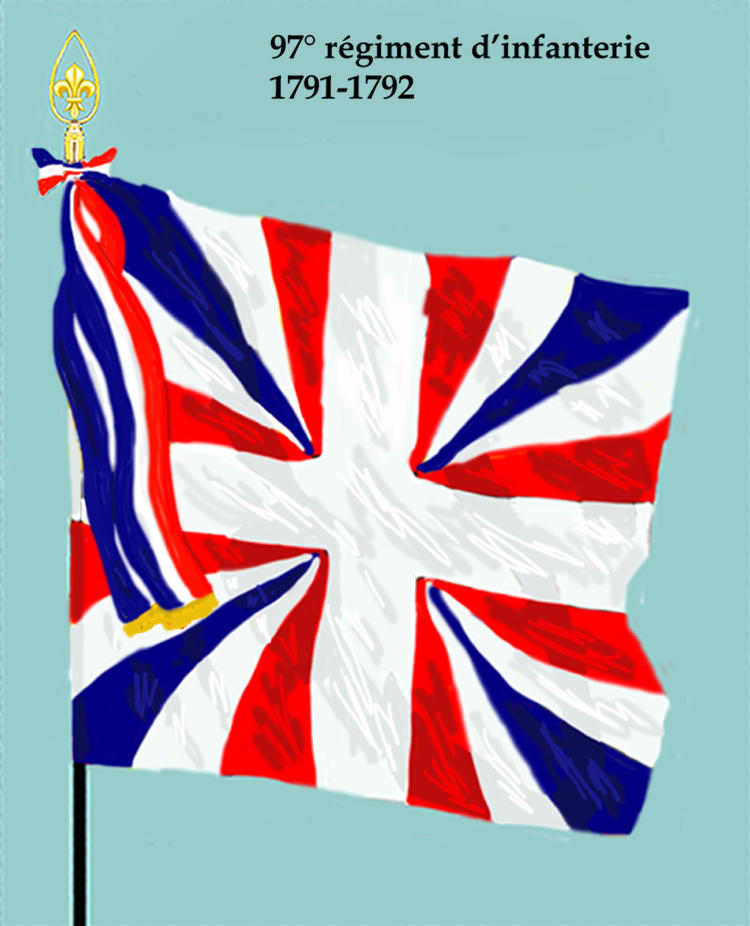
Final regimental colours provided in 1791 and removed in 1792 following the regiment's disbandment. These colours were the same under the Bourbons, only this time with the two streamers in red, white, and blue republican colours.

== Commanding Officers ==
Command officers of the regiment included:

- 1752–1777; Jean-Ulrich, Baron de Lochmann
- 1777–1782; Jean, Baron de Muralt
- 1782–1792; Jakob, Baron de Steiner

== Footnotes ==
Notes

Citations
