= 72nd Infantry Regiment (France) =

French Army regiment created in 1674

72nd Infantry Regiment was an infantry regiment of the French Army. It was created in 1674 as the Régiment de Castries. From 1762 to 1791 it was known as the Régiment du Vexin (an earlier and unrelated Régiment de Vexin existed from 21 September 1684 to 10 February 1749, at the end of which period it was re-formed by incorporating the régiment des Grenadiers de France and survivors of the régiment de Vermandois and renamed). In 1791 the Régiment du Vexin was given the numeral 72. It was disbanded in 1940.
