= Gâtinais Regiment =

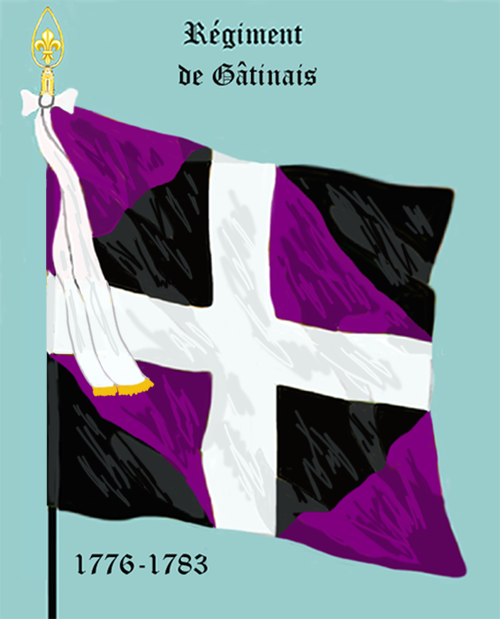
Gâtinais regimental colors

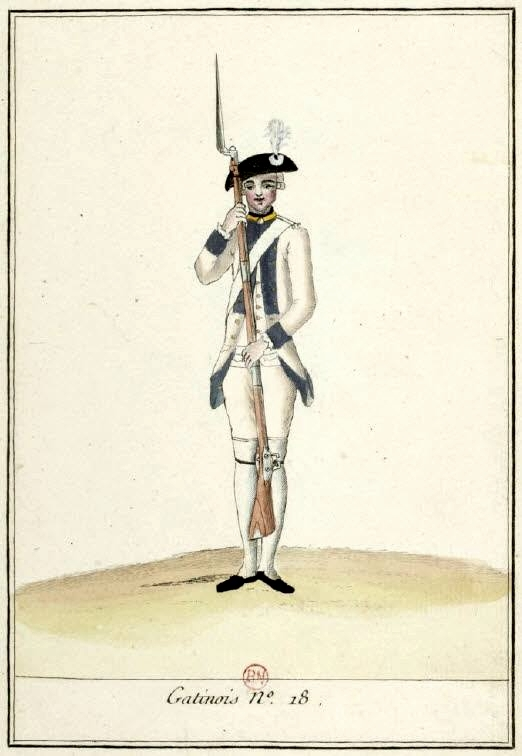
Gatinois in the 1776 regulation uniform

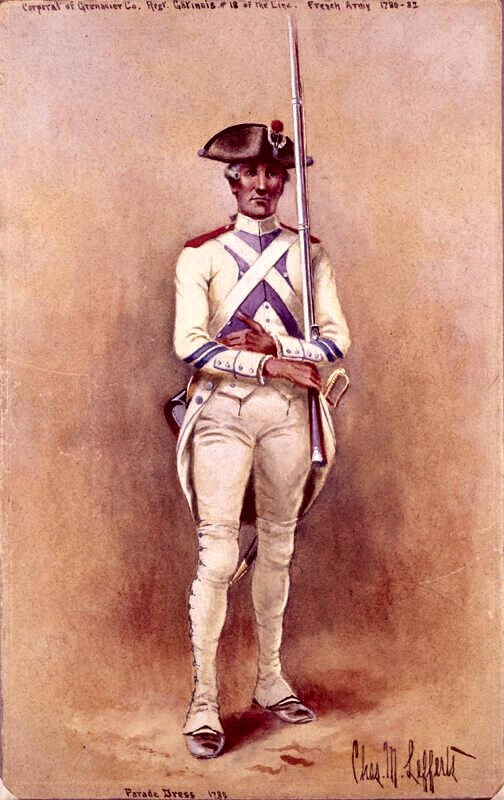
Corporal of the Gâtinais Regiment, Grenadier Company, by Charles M. Lefferts, ca 1910

The Gâtinais Regiment was a French infantry regiment created in 1776 under the Ancien Régime. It fought in the American Revolutionary War and in 1781 received the name of Royal-Auvergne in recognition of its gallant service during the American campaign.

== Regimental organization ==
During French military reorganization after the Seven Years' War, the original Auvergne Regiment was cut in two in a process which was called "dedoublement". It happened to all existing eleven regiments with four battalions. They formed twenty-two new regiments of two battalions strength. Under an ordinance of March 25, 1776, the first and third battalions of the Auvergne retained the old name, and the second and fourth were called the Regiment de Gatinais, No. 18. In order to distinguish itself from the Auvergne, Gatinais took the yellow collar and white buttons. Its flag was black and violet with a white cross. It was similar to the flag of the Regiment de Auvergne.

The second battalion, which was at Martinique from November 20, 1775, went in 1777 to Santo Domingo. The first battalion, which had gone to Calais in June, 1776, left toward the end of that year for Bordeaux, where it embarked September 25, 1777, to rejoin the second battalion in the West Indies. The Gâtinais Regiment remained in garrison at Cap Francois, Saint-Domingue until 1779.

== American campaign ==
In 1779 the Gâtinais Regiment embarked in the fleet of Count d'Estaing and from September 15 to October 20, was in action during the siege of Savannah. The company of chasseurs participated in the attack on the British entrenchments on October 9 . They had taken for their watchword and rallying shout “Auvergne and d'Assas." Ensign Levert entered the British entrenchments first and the defenders briefly withdrew.

The British subsequently returned at once in greater numbers. The chasseurs, lacking support and having lost half their effective strength, retreated in good order, carrying with them their dead and wounded, among whom were Viscount de Bethizy, second colonel, with three wounds; Captain Sireuil, wounded in the side; Captain de Foucault, wounded; Lieutenant de Justamont, killed; Chevalier de la Roche-Negley, wounded in the head; Chevalier de Tourville, wounded by a ball which passed from the right breast to the shoulder; Levert had his clothes riddled with bullets.

In 1781 the regiment was made part of the Corps d'Armee (Agenais, Gâtinais, and Touraine) which Marquis de Saint Simon (1743–1819) brought to America to reinforce Rochambeau. The regiment saw action during the Siege of Yorktown which ended after the surrender of Lord Cornwallis.

The regiment performed with distinction at Yorktown. On October 14, with the Royal Deux-Ponts Regiment and under Lieutenant Colonel de Lestrade, it attacked and captured two redoubts on the left of the British defences. Captain Sireuil, of the Chasseurs, was again wounded, this time seriously, along with two other officers. After the victory, George Washington, to express his admiration, offered, in his name, to the Gâtinais and Royal Deux-Ponts, the three cannons which they had captured from the redoubts. The regiment returned to Saint-Domingue after the end of the American campaign.

On July 11, 1782, in recognition of its excellent conduct in America the name of the regiment was changed to the Royal-Auvergne. That accolade was accorded at the request of Count Rochambeau, who, at the Siege of Yorktown, at the moment of a decisive attack, addressing himself to the grenadiers de Gatanais, said: "Boys, show that Gatinais and Auvergne are one.” The grenadiers swore to be slain, even to the last man, to merit that they be given back the title of "Auvergne".

In 1791 the Royal Auvergne became the Eighteenth Infantry of the Line with headquarters at Pau. It is among the oldest in the French service.

== Field officers ==
The colonels during the American campaign were Marquis de Caupenne, April 18, 1776; Count de Briey de Landres, May 9, 1778; Marquis de Rostaing, October 27, 1778; and Viscount de Rochambeau, July 1, 1783. The following represents the field and company organizations, with the names of the commanding officers and distinctions won in America.

Colonel—Le Marquis de Rostaing (Just Antoine Henry Marie Germain), brigadier-general, December 5, 1781, for gallantry in the capture of Yorktown.

Colonel en second—Le Vicomte de Bethishy (Jacques Eleanor) born December 4, 1748, at Calais; severely wounded at Savannah in 1779.

Lieutenant-colonel—Dé l'Estrade (Claud), born at Puy (Velay), April 5, 1730; brigadier December 5, 1781, for gallantry displayed at Yorktown, Va.

Major—Chapuis de Tourville (Charles Bertin Gaston) born at Hettạnge la Grande, January 4, 1740; rendered efficient service in America, where he performed for nearly a year the functions of major-general.

Paymaster—Vaudrime (François), born at Avauchoux, September 7, 1735; rank of captain November 16, 1783.

Captains (24)—De Lalbengue, born 1730; made prisoner April 12, 1782, on L'Hector. De Rouverie de Cabrières, born 1741; received the cross of chevalier of St. Louis for good conduct at Yorktown. De Vachon, born 1742; received the cross of chevalier of St. Louis December 5, 1781, for participation in the capture of Yorktown. De Chaumont, born 1740; retired 1781. De Sireuil, born 1742; wounded at Savannah and Yorktown; died in the hospital at Williamsburg, December 20, 1781, on account of wounds. Dudrot, born January 16, 1743, chevalier of St. Louis, December 5, 1781, for the taking of Yorktown. Domerque de St. Florent, born 1742; chevalier of St. Louis December 5, 1781, for good conduct at Yorktown. La Borde de Pecomme, born 1743; chevalier of St. Louis December 5, 1781, for the capture of Yorktown. De Langdon, born 1737; chevalier of St. Louis December 5, 1781, for good conduct at Yorktown. De Cussot, Le Muet de Belombre de Jussy, born 1744; died November 15, 1781. De Foucault, born 1741; wounded at Savannah. De Belcostel, born 1745; died at Santo Domingo, January 7, 1780. De Bordenave, born 1742; chevalier of St. Louis December 5, 1781, for Yorktown. De Villelongue de Saint-Morel, born 1748. D'Assas, born 1749. De Mascaron, born 1744; mentioned for good conduct at Yorktown. De Molieres, born 1749; mentioned for good conduct at Yorktown. Carrere de Loubere, born 1750; good conduct at Yorktown. De Villeneuve de Berthelot, born 1750, died 1781 of wounds received at the siege of Yorktown. De Fontbonne, Chalendor, born 1757; good conduct at Yorktown; taken prisoner in the action of April 12, 1782, on Le Caton. De la Morre de Ville aux Bois, born 1757. De la Rochenegly, born 1757; wounded at Savannah; taken prisoner in the action of April 12, 1782, on Le Caton.

Lieutenants (22)—Nearly all these officers received promotion during their service in America. De Chabot was killed September 30, 1780, on the merchant frigate L'Esperance de Bordeaux, on returning to France. De la Fabregue, mentioned for meritorious conduct at Yorktown. Terrade, mentioned for good conduct at Yorktown. Levert de Grenville, mentioned for good conduct at Yorktown; taken prisoner in the action of April 12, 1782, on L'Hector. De la Roche Negly, wounded at Savannah; taken prisoner in the action of April 12, 1782, on Le Caton. La Pierre, good conduct at Yorktown. Chapuis de Tourville, received a musket blow in crossing the breastworks at Savannah. De Durat, taken prisoner in the action of April 12, 1782, on L'Hector. Desillegue, wounded at Yorktown, 1781. De Naveret de Caxon, taken prisoner in the engagement of April 12, 1782, on L'Hector. De Caignet, taken prisoner in action April 12, 1782, on Le Caton. De Leonardy, good conduct at Yorktown.

Ensigns (12)—Many were promoted in America. Bonot was mentioned for good conduct at Yorktown; De Barnaud de Villeneuve was taken prisoner in action April 12, 1782, on L'Ardent.

== Casualties ==
Names of 132 French soldiers who were wounded or killed in the Battle of Yorktown are inscribed on the Yorktown Victory Monument. From the Regiment de Gatinais: Capitaine Jean Jarlan de Sireuil; Capitaine Augustin-Clement; Chevalier de Villeneuve de Berthelot; Sergent-Major Claude Stoudert; Sergent Andre Vachere; Caporal Antoine Beze; Caporal Gilbert Charet; Caporal Louis Deoune; Caporal Pierre Riotte; Mathieu Andiger; Jean-Joseph Bulle; Jacques Bedel; Jean Catel; ClaudeDenis Chamois; Thomas Chavaillard; Joseph Chevalier; Paul Chevalier; Andre Colue; Francois Curdinet; Louis-Victor Curdon; Bertrand Daray; Andre Dese; Jean Domine; Michel-Philippe Dufut; Pierre Gilles; Joseph Giraud; Antoine Gouya; Nicolas Guelin; Joseph Guilleraux; Remy Houba; Claude Julien; Jean LaCoste; Philibert Mouchalin; Pierre Ozanne; Paul Palis; Jean-Baptiste Paulard; Charles Pierson; Charles Remont; Antoine Sallemont; Antoine Serve; Barthelemy Sorbetz; Joseph TinierDinis; Jean Tousset; Jean-Louis Vitre.
