= 42nd Infantry Regiment (France) =

Military unit of France

- 42e régiment d'infanterie
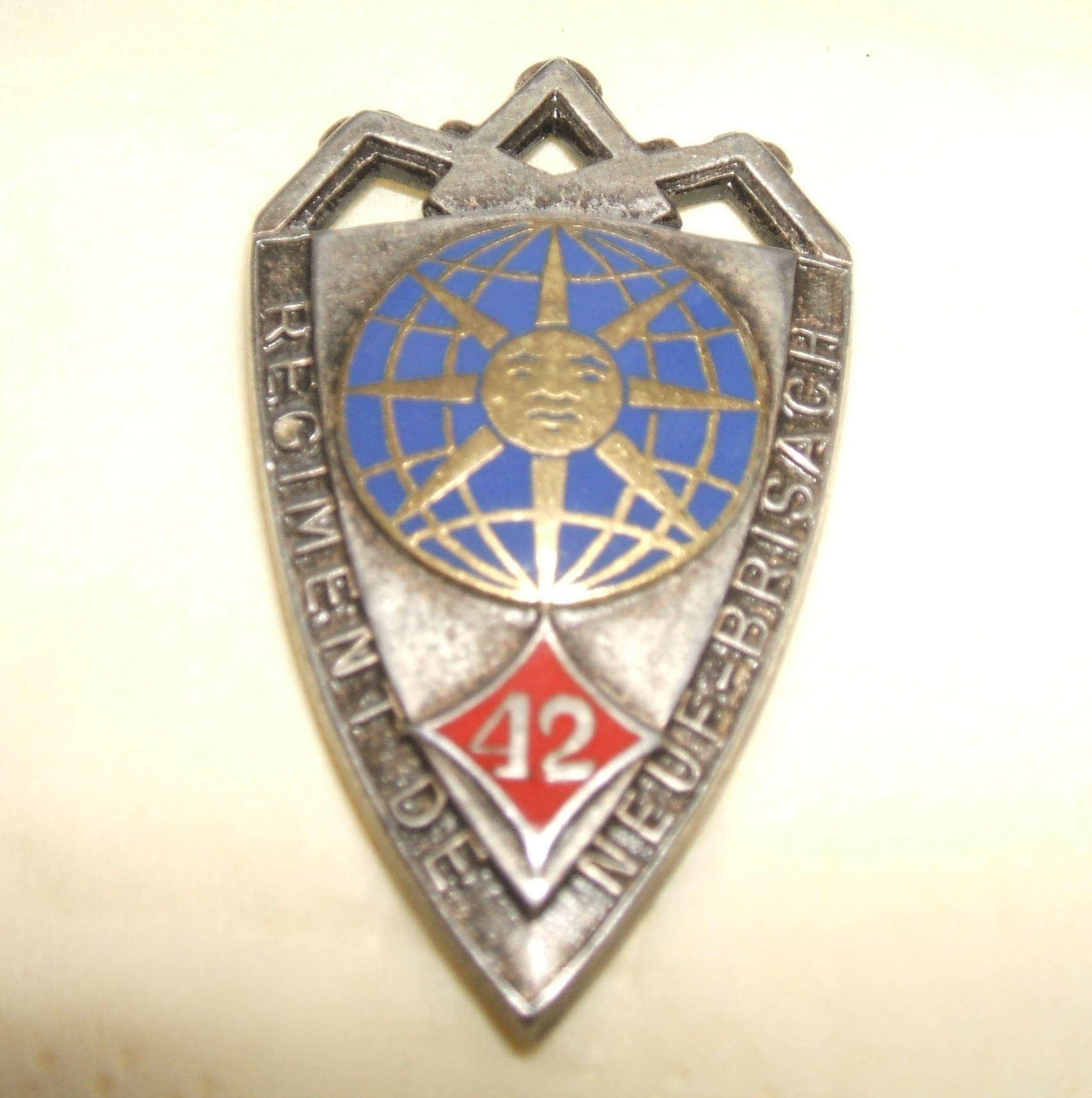
- Active: 1635–1991
- Country: France
- Branch: French Army
- Role: Infantry
- Size: Regiment
- Nickname: As de Carreau
- Engagements: Seven Years' War; French Revolutionary War; Napoleonic Wars; World War I World War II; Cold War

42nd Infantry Regiment (42e régiment d’infanterie or 42e RI) was an infantry regiment of the French Army, raised in 1635 as the 'Régiment de Calvisson'. It was renamed the 1638 : 'Régiment de Montpezat' in 1638 and the 'Régiment du Limousin' in 1684, before first gaining its numeral of 42 in 1791. During the First World War it was nicknamed the 'As de Carreau', since it was part of the 'Division des As' (a nickname for 14th Infantry Division). It was disbanded in 1991.
