= Auvergne Regiment =

Line infantry regiment of the French Royal Army

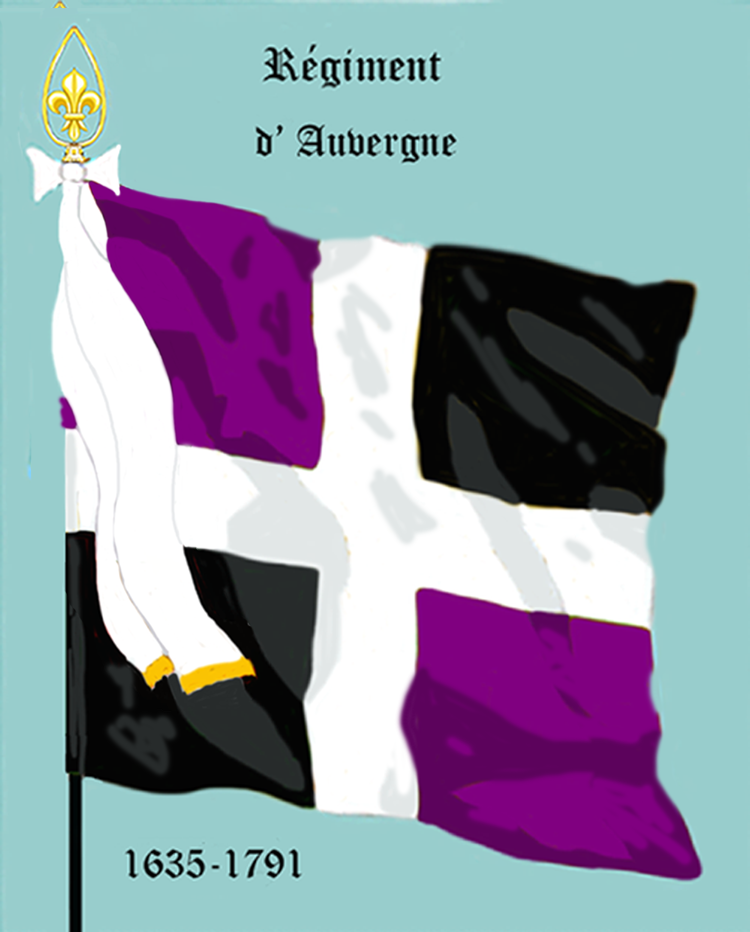
Régiment d'Auvergne's flag

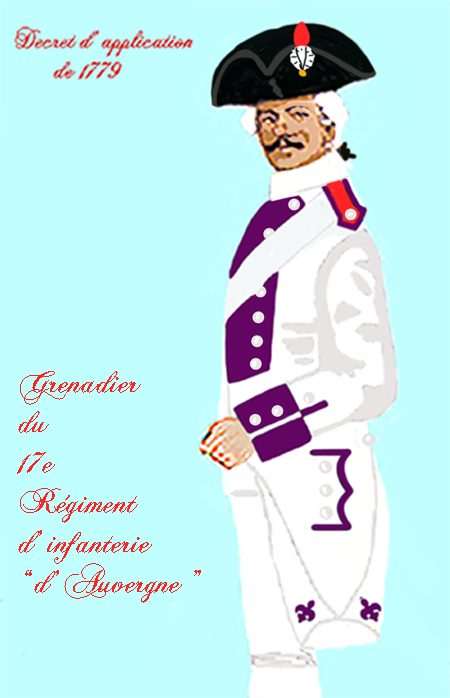
Uniform of a grenadier of the Regiment d'Auvergne in 1779

The Auvergne Regiment was a line infantry regiment of the French Royal Army during the ancien régime and the French Revolution.

- 1597 : the creation of the Régiment du Bourg de Lespinasse.
- 1635 : the régiment becomes the Régiment d'Auvergne. From 1616 to 1635, the new regiments become permanent.
- 1776 : The 2nd and 4th battalions become the Régiment de Gâtinais
