= Saxe Hussar Regiment =

Franco-German military unit

Dragons-Chasseurs de Conflans Légion de Conflans Régiment de Conflans Hussards Régiment de Saxe Hussards
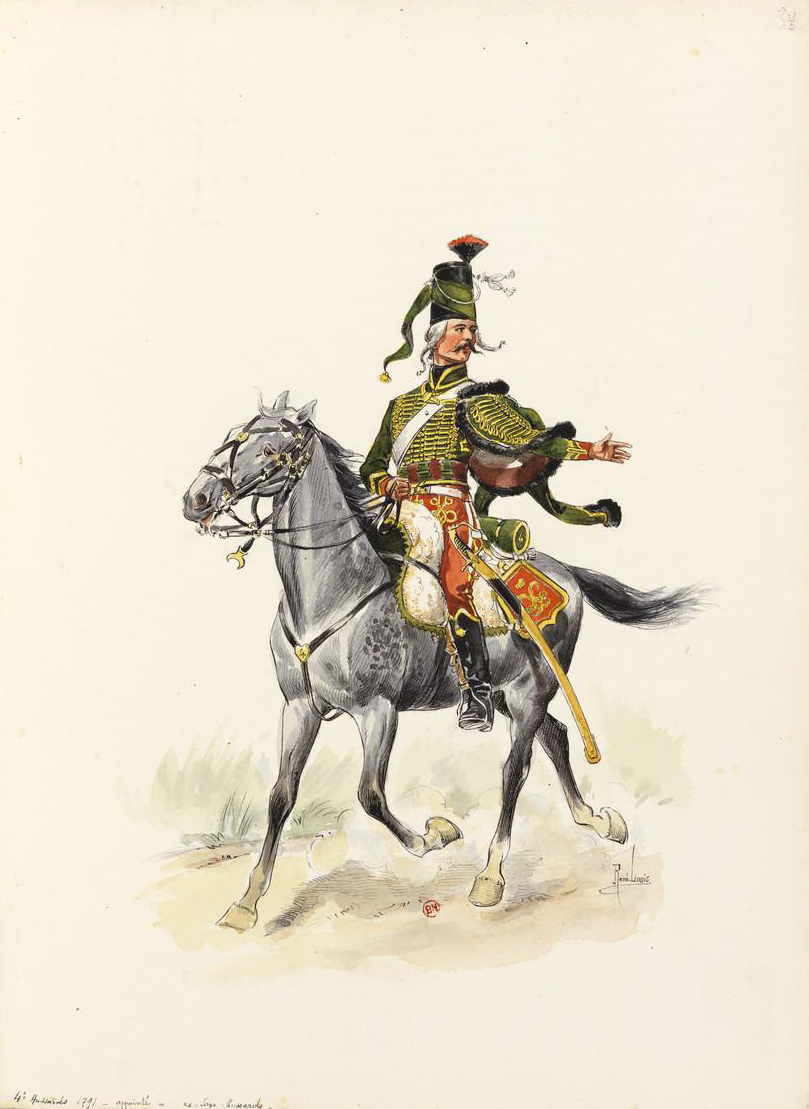
- Chevalier of the 4th Hussars in uniform following the 1791 ordnance.
- Active: 1743–1793; 1792–1798 (émigré)
- Country: Electorate of the Palatinate
- Allegiance: Kingdom of France; French Emigres
- Branch: (Kingdom of France) Armée Royale; Armée des Émigrés
- Type: Legion; Hussars
- Size: Regiment
- Part of: Cavalry Corps
- Depot: Metz, Lorraine and Barrois
- Mottos: "Saxe-Conflans, banner in the wind" "Saxe-Conflans, bannière au vent"
- Engagements: War of the Austrian Succession; Siege of Prague; Siege of Bergen op Zoom; Seven Years' War; Battle of Kloster Kampen; Battle of Villinghausen; French Revolutionary War

The Légion de Conflans (English: "Conflans Legion"), later the Régiment de Saxe Hussards (English: "Saxe Hussar Regiment"), was a German-French legion formed during the War of the Austrian Succession. The legion would later serve in the Seven Years' War, but like the other French legions, it was split and became a hussar regiment. However, following the beginning of the French Revolution, the regiment emigrated en masse and was disbanded shortly thereafter.

== Chasseurs de Fischer ==
=== Formation ===
On 25 March 1743 the Chasseurs de Fischer was formed under the command of the famed Franco-German general Jean Chrétien Fischer, who distinguished himself especially during the Siege of Prague. This new unit was formed when Fischer was authorized to form a company of volunteers, which he had assembled a year before during the said siege. The chasseurs saw service during the Rhine Campaign during the War of the Austrian Succession. and the subsequent retreat from Bohemia. After returning to the west of the Rhine, the chasseurs almost doubled in size during a successful recruiting campaign from German Lorraines.

After their recruiting campaign, the chasseurs were expanded to two companies, one of foot chasseurs (chasseurs à pied) and one of mounted chasseurs (chasseurs à cheval). The foot chasseurs had a similar uniform to that of the mounted chasseurs, one of all green. The mounted chasseurs' uniform consisted of half-scarlet pelisse, hussar boots, and a red crew adorned in the corners with three yellow fish, by allusion, with doubt, in the name of Fischer; they were armed with a rifle, a pair of pistols, and a sabre. All members wore a black cap or shako without a visor, with the white feather and cockade.

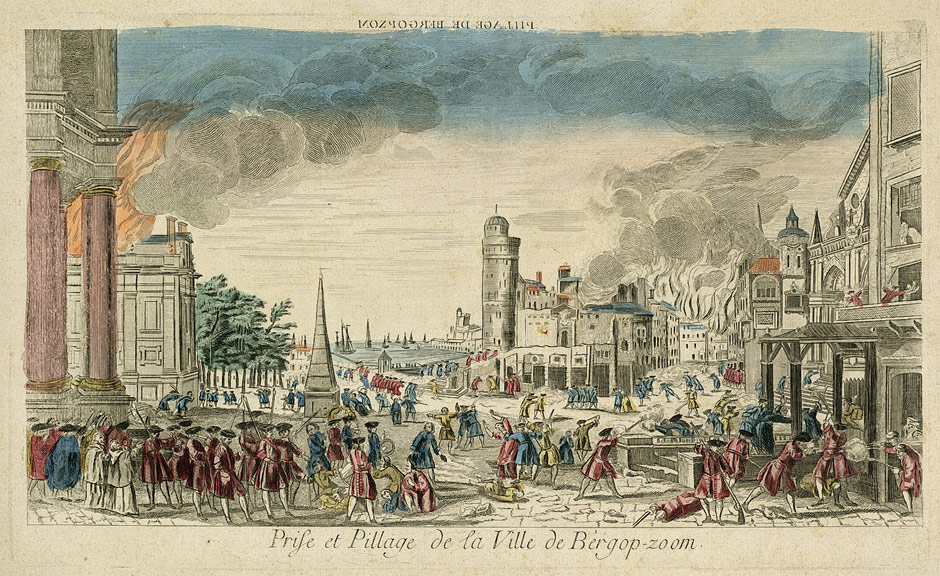
The taking and looting of the Fortress of Bergen op Zoom in 1744.

=== Austrian Succession ===
In 1744, the regiment and commanding officer started to make a for themselves in the Swabian area. In 1746 the chasseurs moved to Flanders, and in the next year took part in the Siege of Bergen op Zoom, and it was at the end of this memorable campaign that the corps officially received an increase which expanded its establishment to 400 infantry and 200 cavalry (4 squadrons of mounted chasseurs and 2 of foot chasseurs).

=== Seven Years' War ===
At the start of the Seven Years' War, the corps was in Lorraine and renamed as the Corps des Chasseurs de Fischer. By this time, the establishment had expanded to 2,000 personnel, divided into 8 companies of mounted chasseurs, and 8 of foot chasseurs. In the midst of so many lost battles, the consolidation and training of the Chasseurs de Fischer helped to keep morale high, in addition with the help of many of the other partisan legions.

In 1758 they captured Marburg and Ziegenheim, where some 14 cannons and 6,000 sacks of flour were captured. They then moved on to capture Gottingue and Embeck, and raided many areas in the country beyond the Werra. In September, they took part in the lively fight with Hanoverian chasseurs, where 200 were killed and 27 captured. A few days later, they 'cut to pieces' a battalion of Prussian grenadiers and the Prussian Dragoon Regiment von Finkensteim where 2 squadrons were destroyed, 3 captured, 2 standards captured, and the regimental cash stolen.

The regiment then took part in the Battle of Oberwitter as part of the defensive formation. In 1760, it protected the posts of La Roër, and distinguished itself particularly at the Battle of Kloster Kampen where it defended the abbey. On 27 April 1761, Fischer decided to cede his legion to the Marquis of Conflans, who followed in his predecessors' footsteps.

== Légion de Conflans ==
Although the Régiment de Saxe can indirectly trace its history to the Chasseurs de Fischer, the cavalry regiment itself was formed in 1761 when the Marquis of Conflans took over as colonel. On 27 April 1761 the Dragons-Chasseurs de Conflans was formed by the Marquis of Conflans as the direct successor to the famed Fischer Chasseurs.

Under the reorganisations, the legions were completely revamped so that they were organised as follows: Regimental Staff, 8 x Chasseurs à Pied (foot chasseurs) and 8 x Chasseurs à Cheval (mounted chasseurs) companies, each consisted of 128 and 132 personnel respectively.

The foot chasseurs consisted of; coat, jacket, and breeches of green with red trim, red collar, 2 gold epaulets, long pockets, yellow buttons, 3 on each pocket, green cloth cap for the chasseurs, and a bearskin cap for the grenadiers. The mounted chasseurs uniform consisted of a green jacket and pelisse, red breeches, yellow buttons, flap on each sleeve, in read cloth, garnished with a small aurora border, and a black cap.

=== Seven Years' War ===
Just three months after formation, the regiment saw service during the Battle of Villinghausen, and pursued the army of Prince Ferdinand of Brunswick, who had decamped Soëst. The regiment then near Hausdulmen when it engaged a British Army battalion and almost completely destroyed it. On the 20th, the regiment fought remainders of the main allied army near Ibbenbüren, and kidnapped some 40 prisoners. On the 30th near Rhen, the regiment surprised retreating troops and took 50 prisoners from Scheither's Light Troops (Prussian unit) and brought back 30 crew cars. The regiment then detached from the main French army and occupied the city of Osnabrück and captured some 400 horses and 800 food wagons.

At the beginning of 1762, the legion defeated an element of the hussars of the Schwarze Brigade (known as the Black-Yellow Hussars), taking 17 prisoners including 2 officers. This action was so significant that the brigade was disbanded by King Frederick of Prussia himself because of the defeat. On 22 June 1762 the regiment took part in the Battle of Recklinghausen, where it captured 40 horses and took 200 prisoners, among which were a colonel and a major. Another significant blow for the Prussians came when two chasseurs of the regiment captured the hereditary prince of Prussia, but soon saved by the Dragoon Regiment von Bock. Three days later a new engagement saw the regiment kill 20 men, wounding twice as many, 200 horses captured, a colonel and cornet of the Hessian Gendarmerie, and a major and cornet of the Carabinier Regiment von Brunswick captured. In October, it was present at the Battle of Smalemberg, where 95 infantry, 132 cavalry, and 14 officers were captured.

On 1 March 1763, the regiment's name changed to the Légion de Conflans, and its establishment expanded to 17 companies: one of grenadiers (foot), eight of fusiliers (foot), and eight of dragoons (mounted). The uniform remained green, entirely green with yellow buttons. The dragoons wore a green uniform, bordered by a white braid crossing its length in a green stripe. The regiment was then garrisoned in Flanders to expand, before reuniting in Metz mid 1763, then Vic in 1766. Unlike the majority of the legions raised for the Seven Years' War, the Conflans Legion remained due to their proven courage and tenacity.

=== Peacetime ===
In 1768 the dragoons of the regiment were transformed into hussars, entirely dressed in green with yellow braids, a black shako line with green, red sabretache with braided green with the king's number in green cloth edged with yellow; sheepskin shabraque with green wolf teeth. In 1770 the legion moved to Marsal, Mirecourt in 1775, and it was there that the legion was re-organised into an hussar regiment by the 1776 Ordnance. Under this ordnance, all Legions were disbanded and their infantry companies reorganised into chasseurs and attached to every infantry battalion as their Compagnie de Chasseurs, while the hussar squadrons were converted to Chasseurs à Cheval and formed the mounted equivalent of the former in each cavalry regiment. Although, unlike the other legions the Conflans legion's lineage would continue, as three of the hussar squadrons formed a cadre of the new Régiment de Conflans Hussards, which was increased on the same day to four squadrons by the absorption of the 3rd squadron of the Régiment de Nassau Cavalerie (15th).

== Saxe Hussars ==
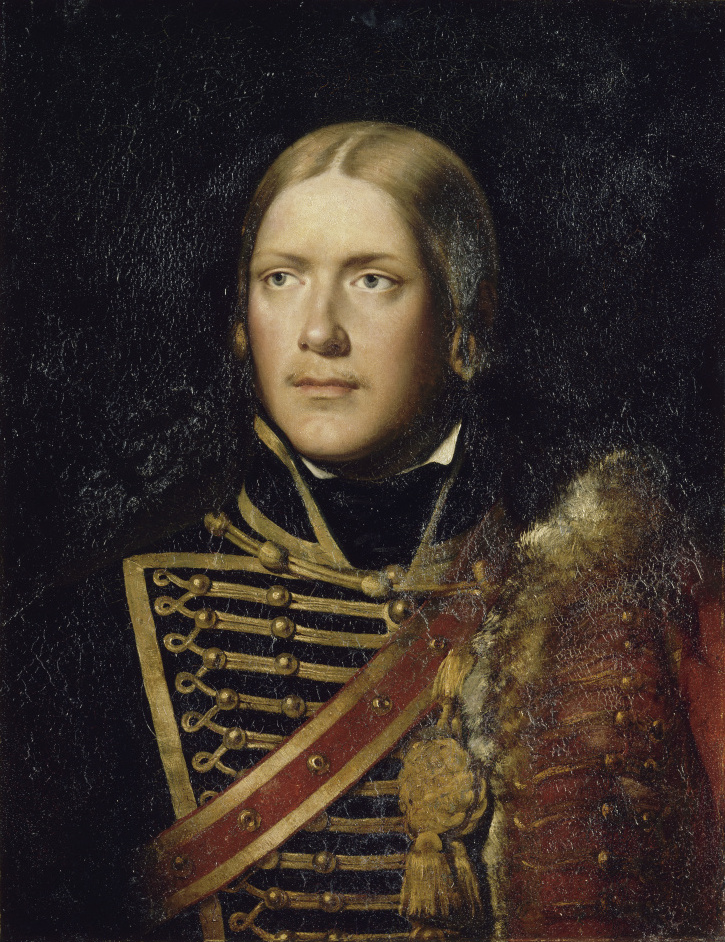
Michel Ney as a sous-lieutenant in the Saxe Hussards in 1792. Ney would go on to be a Marshal of the Empire under Napoleon.

Following the Seven Years War, the French Royal Army was entirely reorganised, re-modelled, and most importantly re-trained. Under the guise of the Minister of War, Étienne François, Duke of Choiseul. While the French reformers had mixed results and there were evident setbacks, the French Army was well-trained, had new uniform regulations, and was backed up by a military education system that was second to none.

In 1778 the regiment moved to Landau, then to Haguenau in 1782, Landau again in 1788, Haguenau again in 1788, then to Pont-à-Mousson in 1792, and finally Sarreguemines in 1792. On 27 May 1788, the regimental establishment was expanded to five squadrons just before the Prince of Saxony took over as commander in chief of the regiment. On 1 March 1789 the regiment was renamed to become the Régiment de Saxe Hussards, ranked 5th in the line.

== 4th Hussars ==
When the French Revolution began, many of the old foreign regiments were looked down upon after the King decided to bring in foreign regiments to crush the, then, rebellion. Therefore, on 1 January 1791 the regiment became the 4éme Régiment de Hussards (Saxe) in an effort by the National Assembly to remove the old strains of monarchy and the 'foreign troops'. Because of the majority of the regiment were composed of Germans from the nearby Duchy of Palatinate, almost all of the officers and men emigrated on 4 May 1792. When most of the men left, the main element of the 4th squadron remained, and was promptly grouped with a squadron from the late Régiment Royal Allemand Cavalerie to form the Légion de la Moselle. In 1793, the regiment was officially disbanded, and the lineage ceased due to the mass emigration.

At the time of the regiment's emigration, the uniform consisted of the following: green dolman, green pelisse, yellow lace, red breeches, crimson & green sash, and green mirliton.

== Émigré service ==
Following the regiment's mass emigration, remnants were pieced together to reform the Régiment de Saxe Hussards (Saxe Hussar Regiment), and was taken into Royalist émigré service. Shortly after formation, the new regiment joined the recently émigrated Armée des Princes (Army of the Princes). By September 1792, following the disastrous Battle of Valmy, the Army of the Princes was disbanded, and the regiment passed into Austrian service.

On 25 April 1798, together with elements of the Bercheny Hussar Regiment, the new Leichtes Dragoner-Regiment von Rosenberg Nr.13 was formed and became 13th in line of precedence of the line cavalry corps. In 1802, this regiment then became the Chevauléger Regiment von Rosenberg Nr.6 and saw service during the Napoleonic Wars.

== Uniform gallery ==
Below is a gallery of uniforms of the regiment:

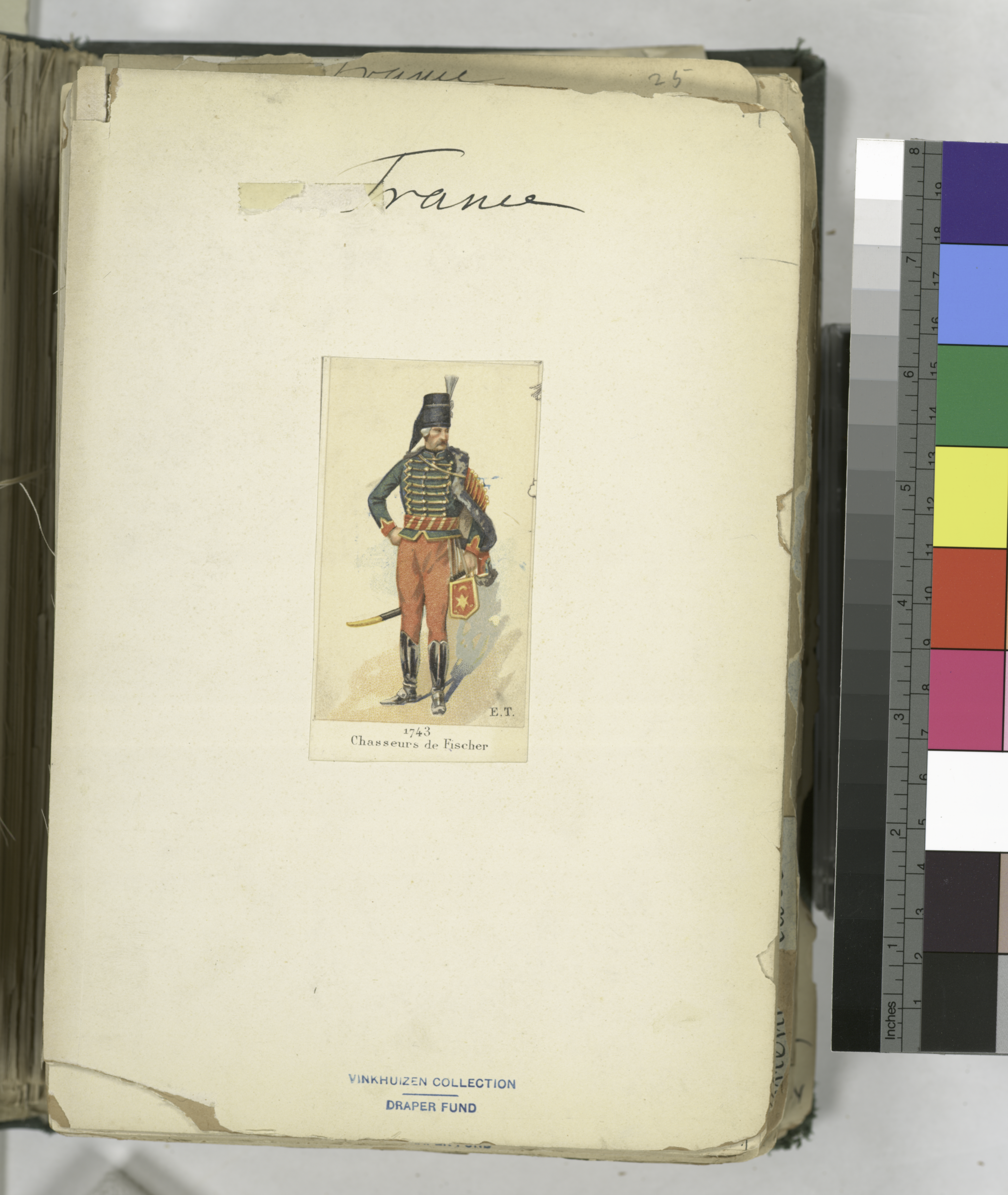
Uniform of a Hussar of the Conflans legion in 1743.

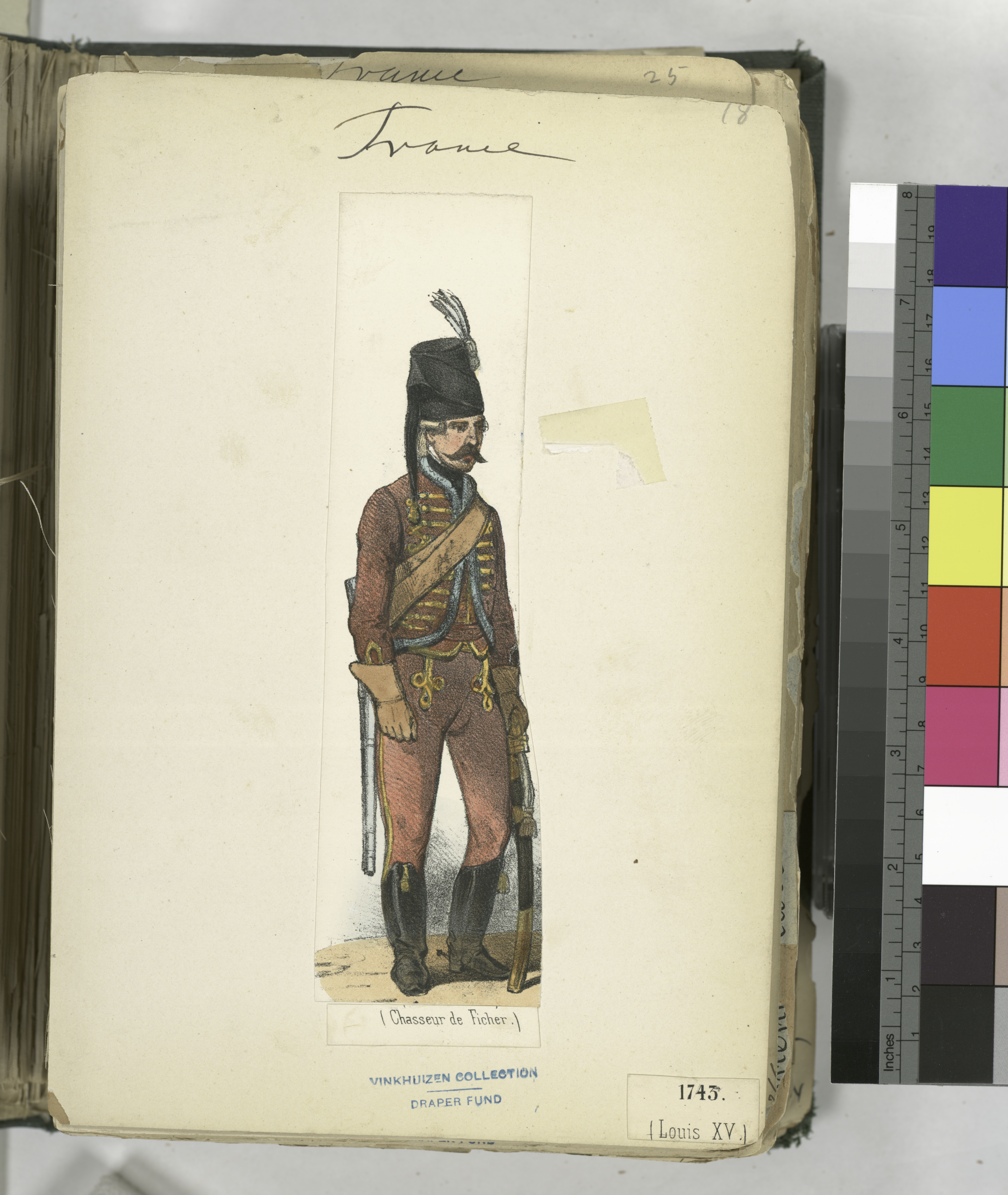
Uniform of a Hussar of the Fischer Chasseurs sometime between 1743–1745.

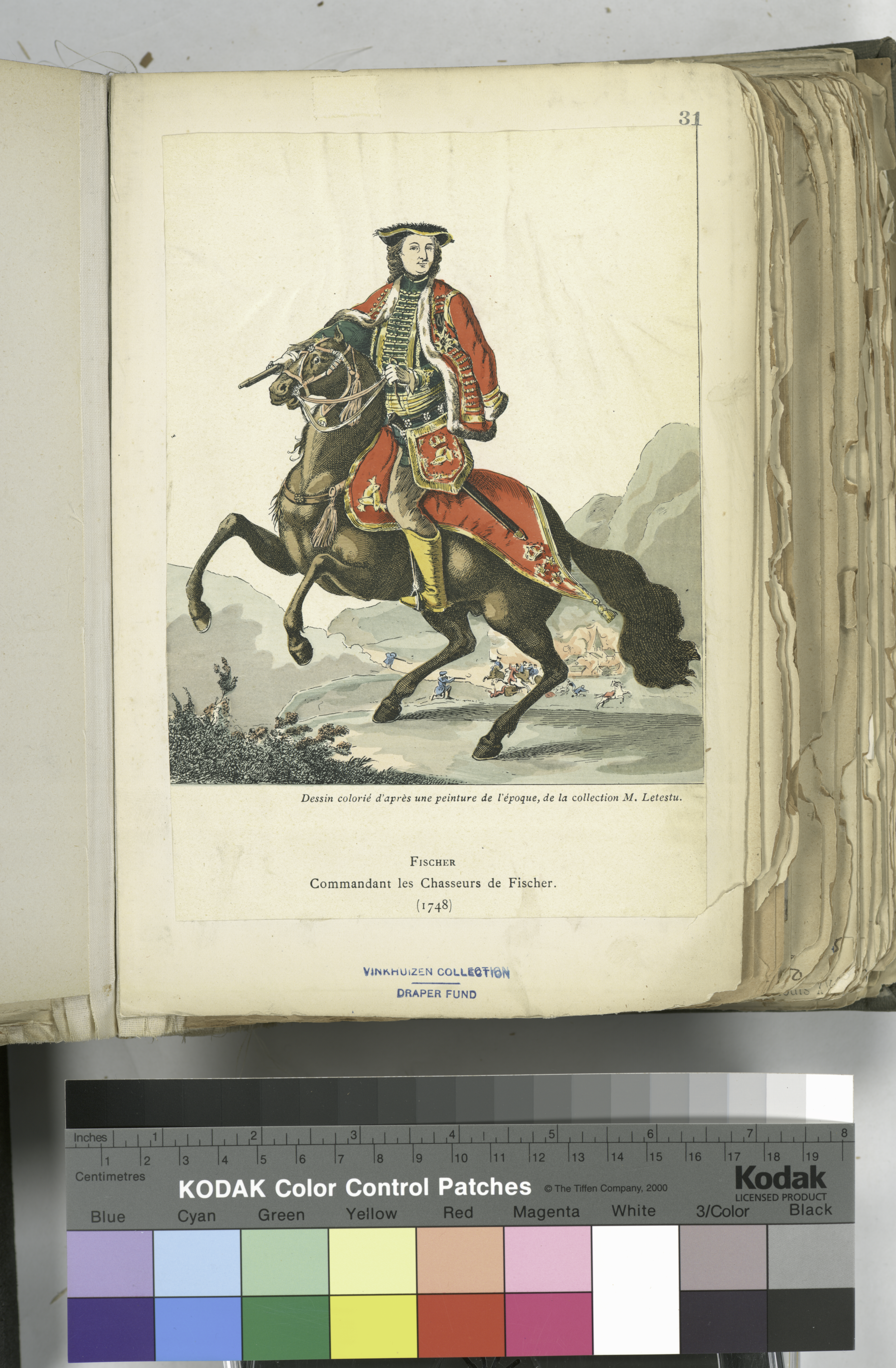
Uniform of the Marquis de Fischer as commandant of the Fischer Chasseurs as he appeared in 1748.

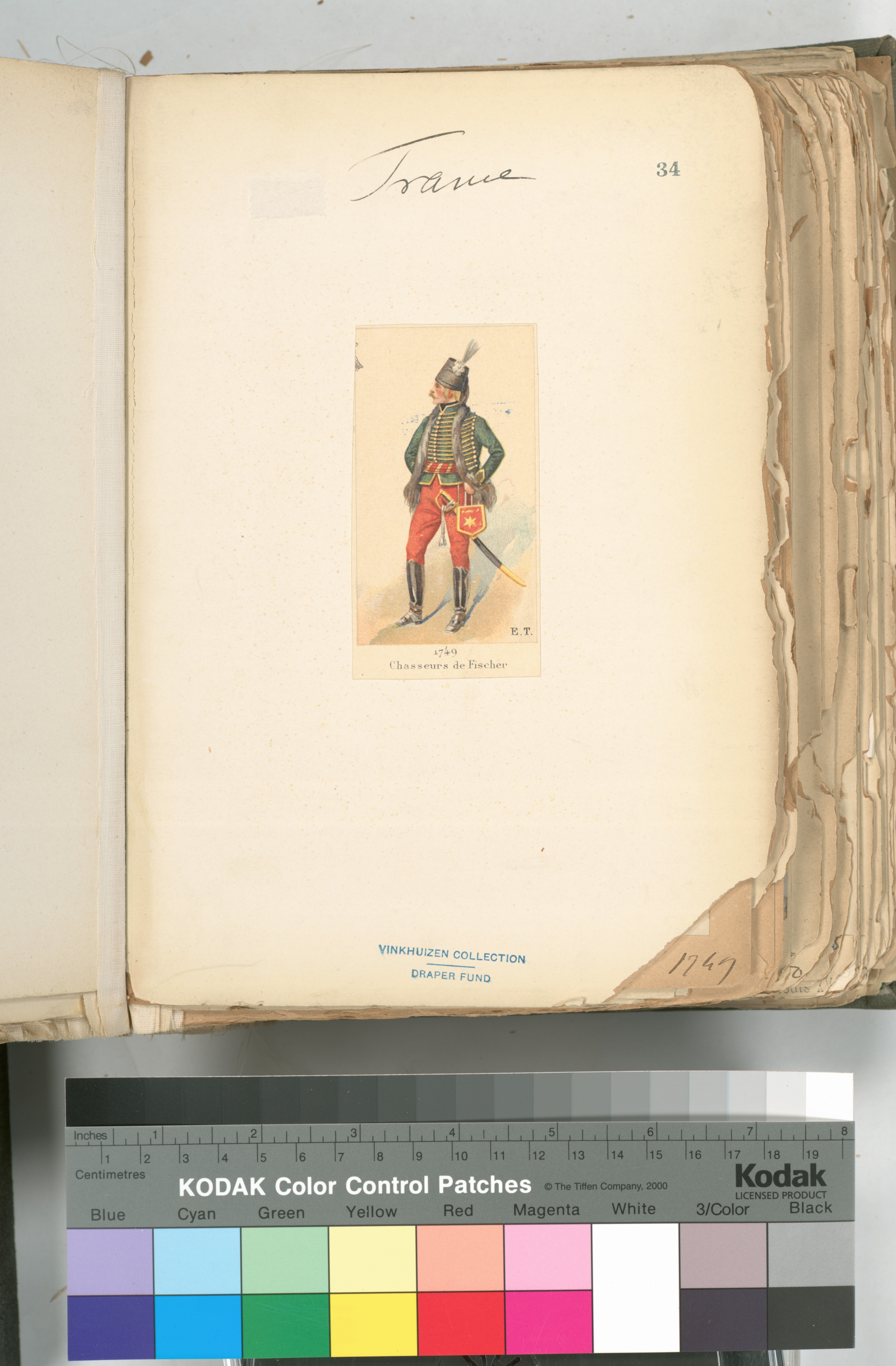
Uniform of a hussar officer of the Fischer chasseurs in 1749.

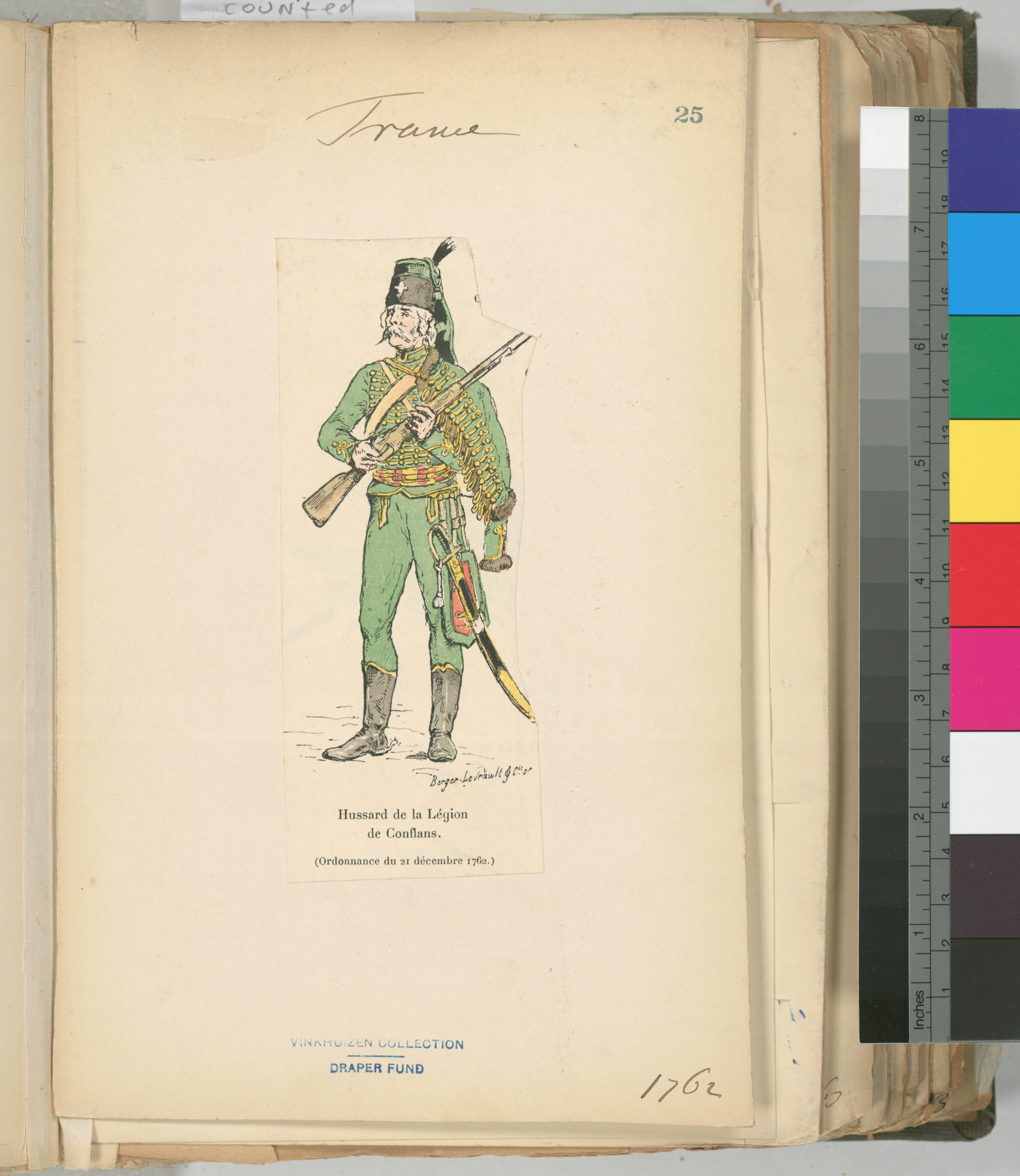
Mounted chasseurs' uniform of the Legion as it appeared in 1762.

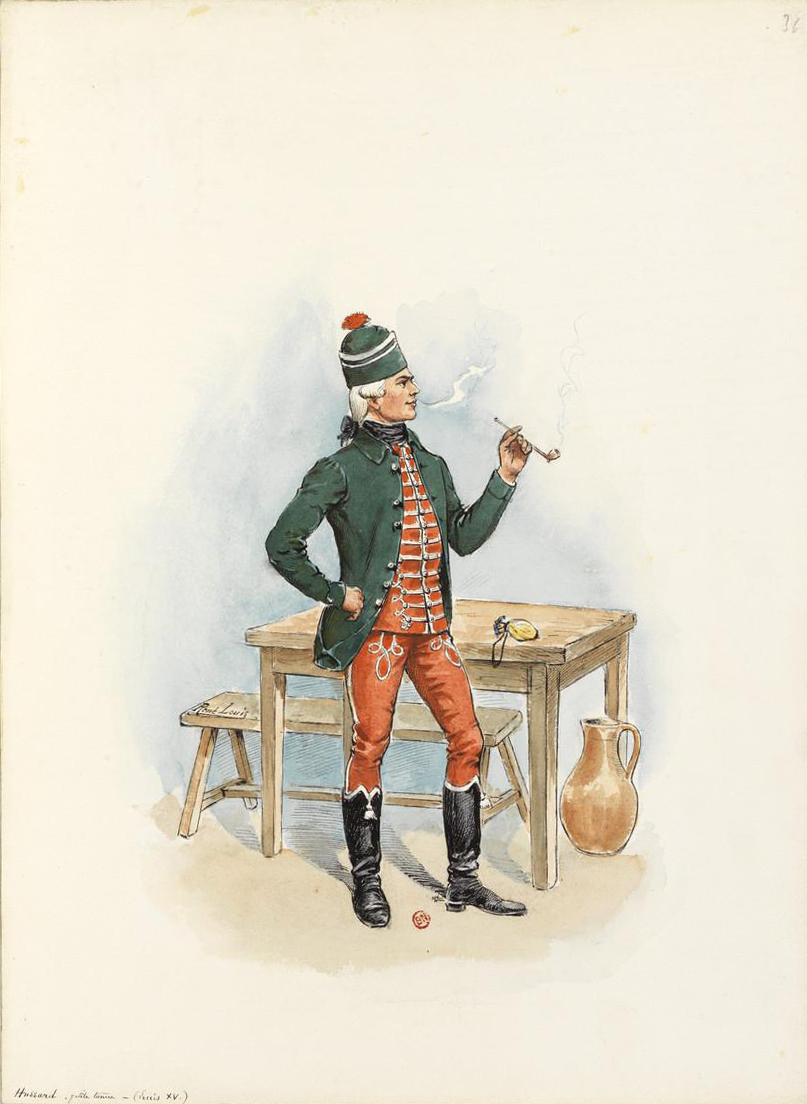
Chevalier in Petite-Tenue or "Small Tenure", known in the English world as off-duty uniform. This chevalier is in uniform of the legion during Louis XV's reign.

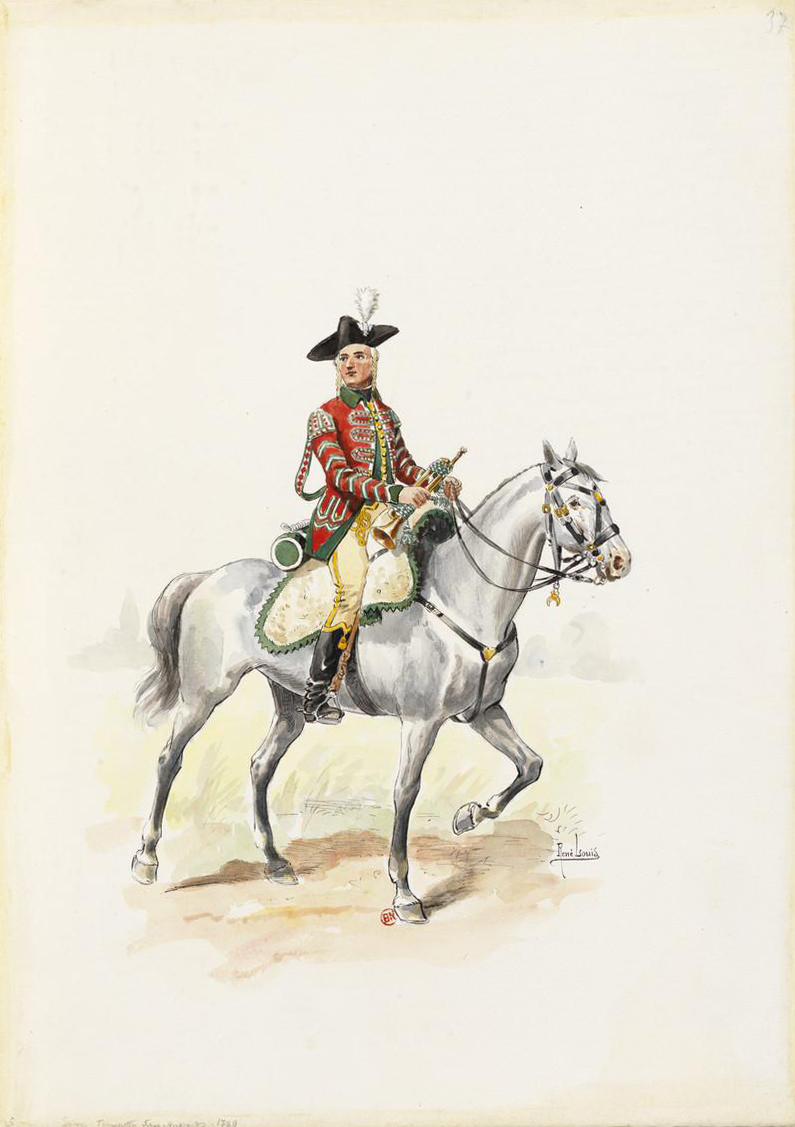
Trumpeter of the regiment in uniform following the 1786 uniform reorganisations. The reversed Green/Red facings can be seen.

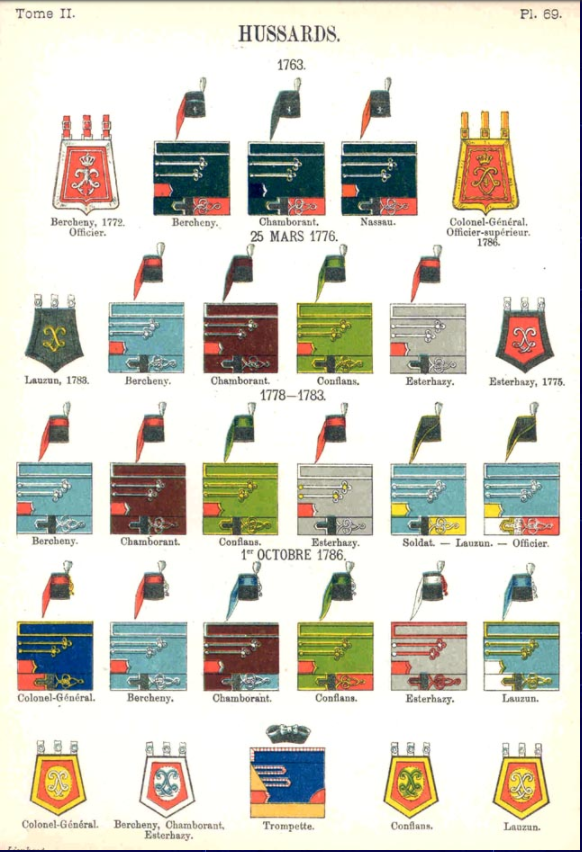
Uniform variations of French hussar regiments as they appeared in 1763.

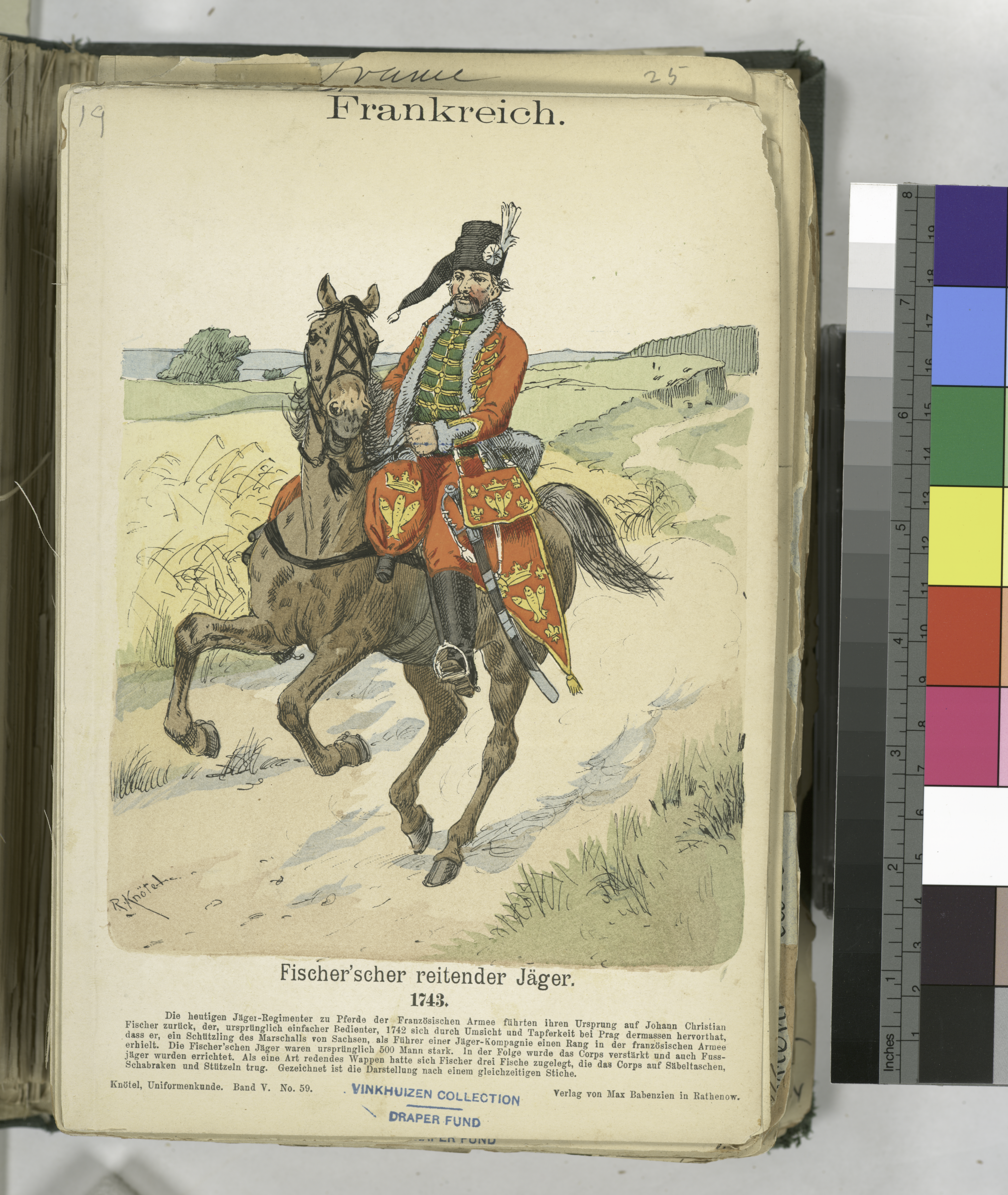
Hussar of the Fischer Mounted Chasseurs in uniform during 1743.

== Commanding Officers ==
Commanding officers of the regiment included:

- 1743–1761 Jean Chrétien Fischer
- 1761–1789 Charles Louis Gabriel de Conflans, Marquis d'Armentières
- 1789–1791 Prince Franz Xavier Auguste de Saxe, Comte de Lusace
- 1791–1791 Jacques Drouot de La Marche (name inscribed on the Arc de Triomphe)
- 1791–1791 Frédéric Henri Gottesheim
