= Execution of Louis XVI =

1793 public execution of former king of France

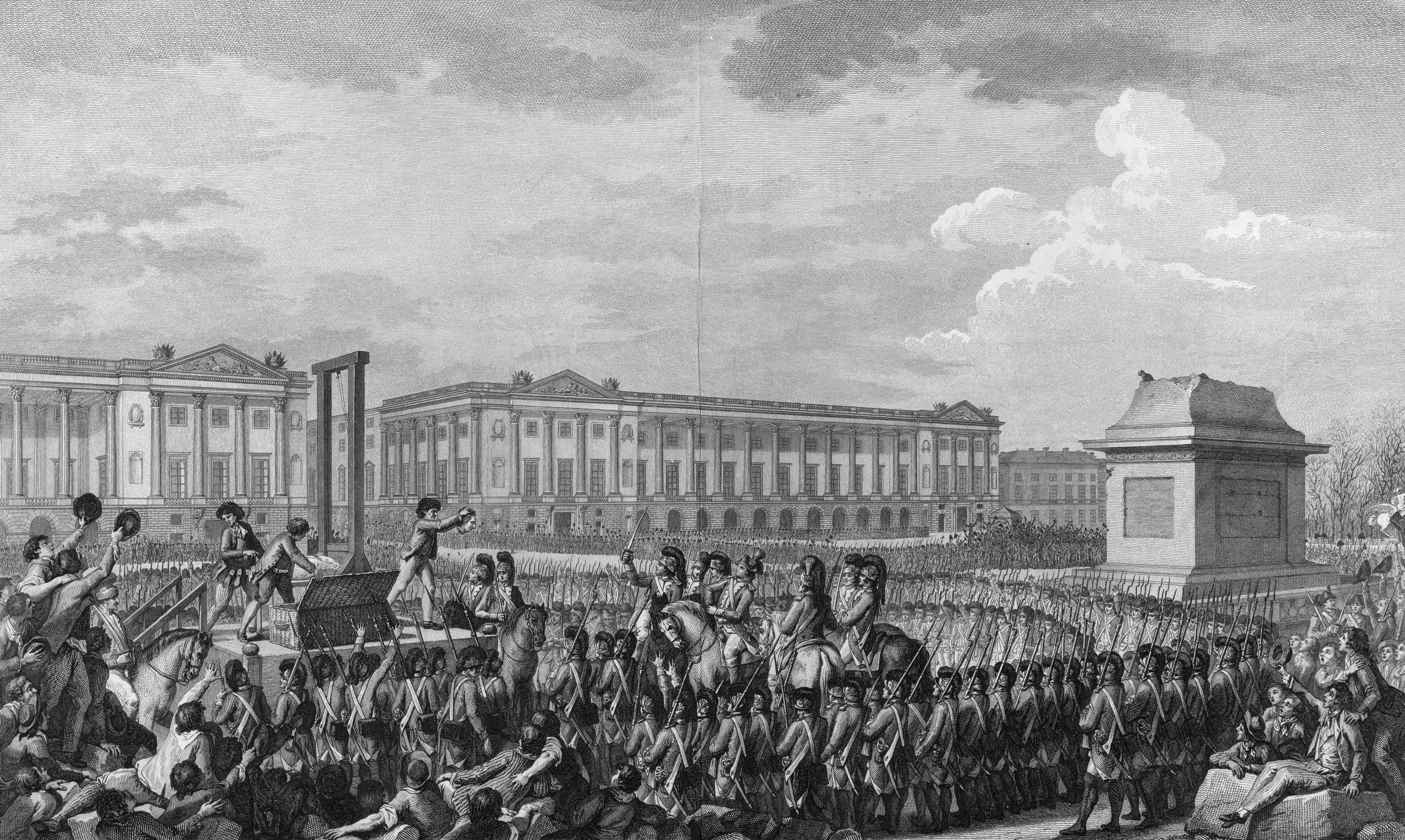
Day of 21 January 1793 – the death of Louis Capet at the Place de la Révolution, by Charles Monnet (1794)

Louis XVI, the deposed king of France, was publicly executed on 21 January 1793, during the French Revolution at the Place de la Révolution in Paris. At Louis XVI's trial four days prior, the National Convention had convicted Louis of high treason in a near-unanimous vote; while no one voted "not guilty", several deputies abstained. Ultimately, they condemned Louis to death by a simple majority of one vote. The execution by guillotine was performed by Charles-Henri Sanson, the high executioner of the French First Republic (and previous royal executioner under Louis XVI's reign).

Often viewed as a turning point in both French and European history, the execution garnered differing reactions around the world. To some, Louis's death at the hands of his former subjects symbolized the end of an unbroken thousand-year period of monarchy in France and the true beginning of democracy within the nation, although Louis would not be the last king of France with the Bourbon Restoration by 1814. Others (even some who had supported major political reform) condemned the execution as an act of senseless bloodshed and saw it as a sign that France had devolved into a state of violent, amoral chaos.

Louis's death emboldened revolutionaries throughout the country, who continued to alter French political and social structure radically over the next several years. Nine months after Louis's death, his wife Marie Antoinette, formerly queen of France, met her own death at the guillotine at the same location in Paris.

== Background ==
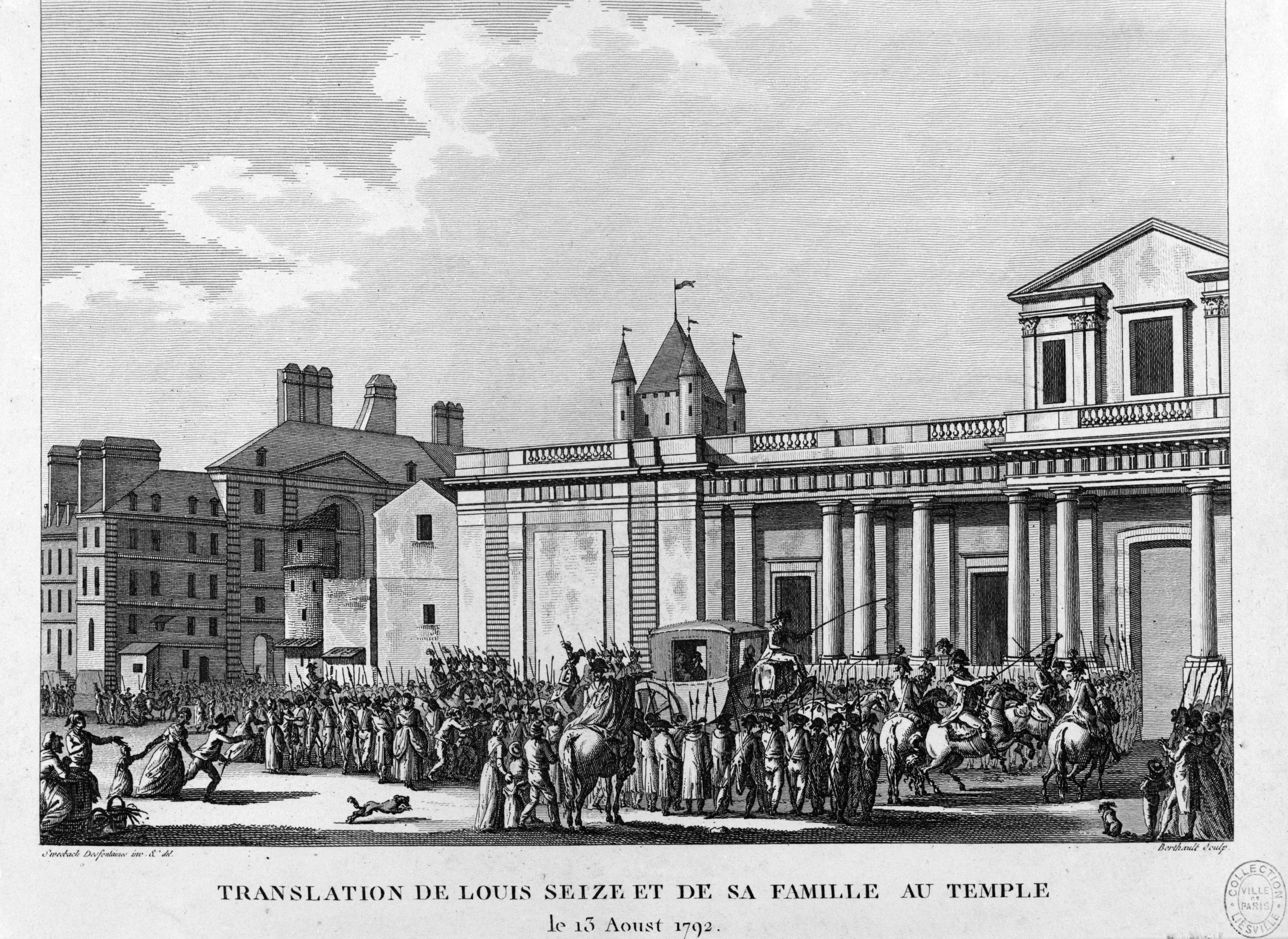
Louis XVI and his family being transferred to the Temple Prison on 13 August 1792. Engraving by Jacques François Joseph Swebach-Desfontaines, 1792.

Following the attack on the Tuileries Palace during the insurrection of 10 August 1792, King Louis XVI was imprisoned at the Temple Prison in Paris, along with his wife Marie Antoinette, their two children and his younger sister Élisabeth. The Convention's unanimous decision to abolish the monarchy on 21 September 1792, and the subsequent foundation of the French Republic, left the fate of the former king open to debate. A commission was established to examine the evidence against him while the Convention's Legislation Committee considered legal aspects of any future trial. On 13 November, Maximilien Robespierre stated in the Convention that a Constitution which Louis himself had violated, and which declared his inviolability, could not now be used in his defence. On 20 November, opinion turned sharply against Louis following the discovery of a secret cache of 726 documents consisting of Louis's communications with bankers and ministers.

With the question of the King's fate now occupying public discourse, Robespierre delivered a speech that would define the rhetoric and course of Louis's trial. Robespierre argued that the dethroned king could now function only as a threat to liberty and national peace and that the members of the Assembly were not to be impartial judges but rather statesmen with responsibility for ensuring public safety:

Louis was a king, and our republic is established; the critical question concerning you must be decided by these words alone. Louis was dethroned by his crimes; Louis denounced the French people as rebels; he appealed to chains, to the armies of tyrants who are his brothers; the victory of the people established that Louis alone was a rebel; Louis cannot, therefore, be judged; he already is judged. He is condemned, or the republic cannot be absolved. To propose to have a trial of Louis XVI, in whatever manner one may, is to retrogress to royal despotism and constitutionality; it is a counter-revolutionary idea because it places the revolution itself in litigation. In effect, if Louis may still be given a trial, he may be absolved, and innocent. What am I saying? He is presumed to be so until he is judged. But if Louis is absolved, if he may be presumed innocent, what becomes of the revolution? If Louis is innocent, all the defenders of liberty become slanderers.

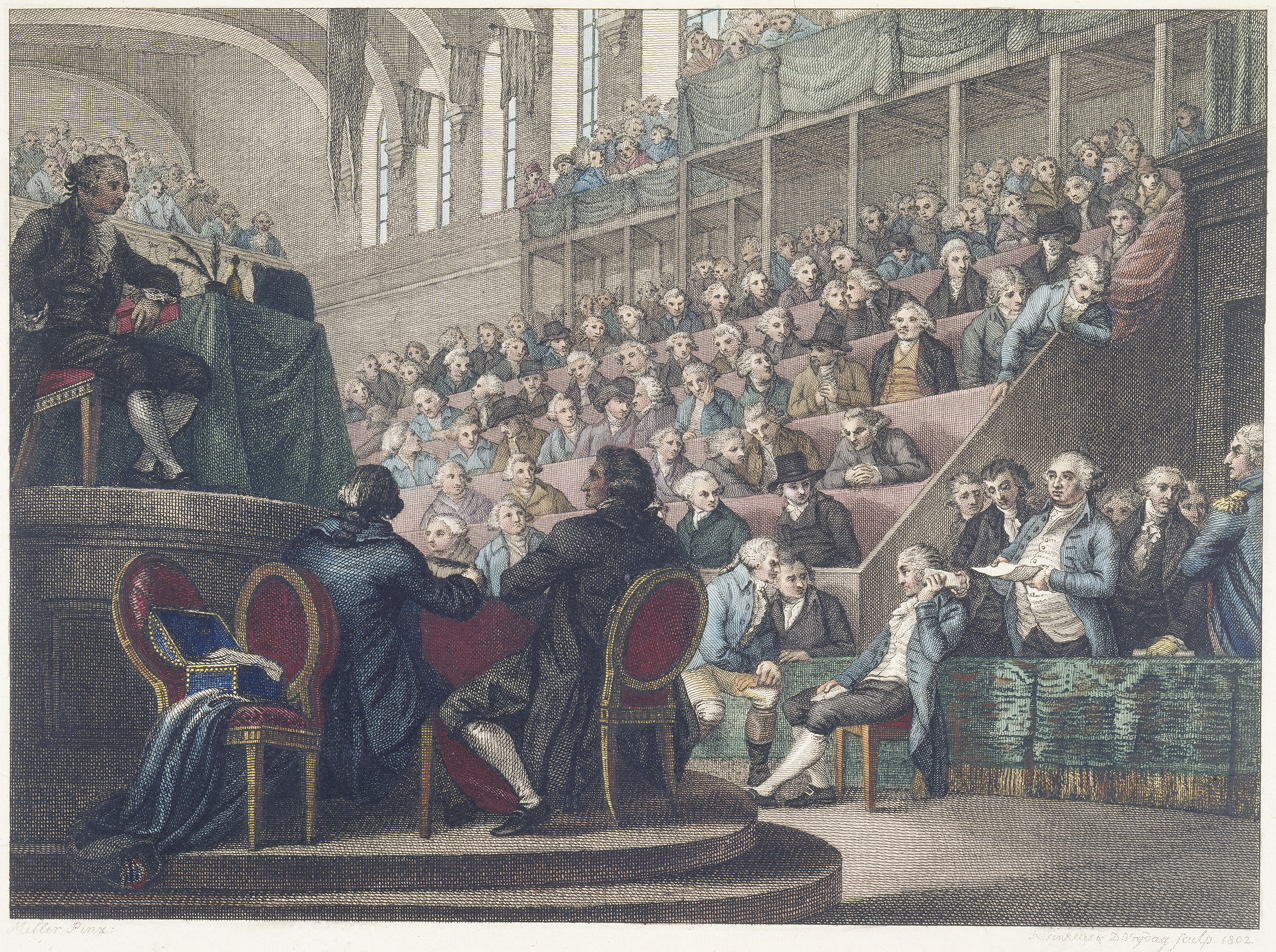
Louis stands trial before the Convention, as Robespierre watches from the first row. Engraving by Reinier Vinkeles, c. 1793–1796.

In arguing for a judgment by the elected Convention without trial, Robespierre supported the recommendations of Jean-Baptiste Mailhe, who headed the commission reporting on legal aspects of Louis's trial or judgment. Unlike some Girondins (Pétion), Robespierre specifically opposed judgment by primary assemblies or a referendum, believing that this could cause a civil war. While he called for a trial of Queen Marie Antoinette and the imprisonment of Louis-Charles de France, the Dauphin of France, Robespierre advocated that the King be executed despite his opposition to capital punishment:

Yes, the death penalty is, in general, a crime, unjustifiable by the indestructible principles of nature, except in cases protecting the safety of individuals or the society altogether. Ordinary misdemeanours have never threatened public safety because society may always protect itself by other means, making those culpable powerless to harm it. But for a king dethroned in the bosom of a revolution, which is as yet cemented only by laws; a king whose name attracts the scourge of war upon a troubled nation; neither prison nor exile can render his existence inconsequential to public happiness; this cruel exception to the ordinary laws avowed by justice can be imputed only to the nature of his crimes. With regret, I pronounce this fatal truth: Louis must die so that the nation may live.

All the deputies from the Mountain were asked to attend the meeting on 3 December. Most Montagnards favoured judgment and execution, while the Girondins were more divided concerning how to proceed, with some arguing for royal inviolability, others for clemency, and others advocating lesser punishment or banishment. The next day on 4 December the Convention decreed all the royalist writings illegal. 26 December was the day of the last hearing of the King. On 28 December, Robespierre was asked to repeat his speech on the fate of the king in the Jacobin club. On 14 January 1793, the King was unanimously voted guilty of conspiracy and attacks upon public safety. Never before the Convention was like a court. On 15 January the call for a referendum was defeated by 424 votes to 287, which Robespierre led. On 16 January, voting began to determine the King's sentence; the session continued for 24 hours. Robespierre worked fervently to ensure the king's execution. The Jacobins successfully defeated the Girondins' final appeal for clemency. On 20 January, 361 of the 721 deputies voted for immediate death with one vote majority.

== Night of 20 January ==
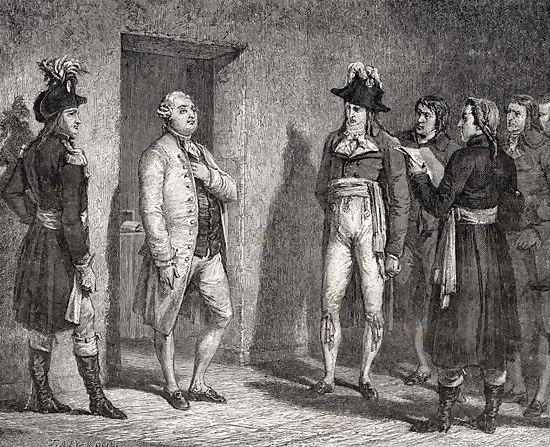
Dominique Joseph Garat announces the death sentence to Louis XVI on 20 January 1793, by Hippolyte de la Charlerie

After voting for Louis's execution, the Convention sent a delegation to announce the verdict to the former king at the Temple Prison. Louis made a number of requests, notably asking for an additional period of three days before his execution and a final visit from his family. The deputies accepted the latter but refused to postpone the execution. Louis was served his last dinner at around 7 p.m. After meeting with his confessor, the Irish priest Henry Essex Edgeworth, at around 8 p.m. Louis received the former royal family at his room. He was visited by Marie Antoinette, their children Marie-Thérèse and Louis-Charles, and his sister Élisabeth. At around 11 p.m., Louis's family left the Temple and the former king again met with his confessor. He went to sleep at half past midnight.

== Final hours at the Temple Prison ==
Louis was awakened by his valet Jean-Baptiste Cléry at around 5 a.m., and was greeted by a host of people including Jacques Roux, who was appointed to report on the day's events by the Paris Commune. After dressing with Cléry's aid, the former king was joined by Edgeworth at approximately 6 a.m. He heard his last Mass, served by Cléry, and received Viaticum. The Mass requisites were provided by special direction of the authorities.

On Edgeworth's advice, Louis avoided a last farewell scene with his family. At 7 a.m. he confided his last wishes to the priest: his royal seal was to go to his son and his wedding ring to his wife. At around 8 a.m. the commander of the National Guard, Antoine Joseph Santerre, arrived at the Temple. Louis received a final blessing from Edgeworth, presented his last will to a municipal official and handed himself over to Santerre.

== Journey to the Place de la Révolution ==
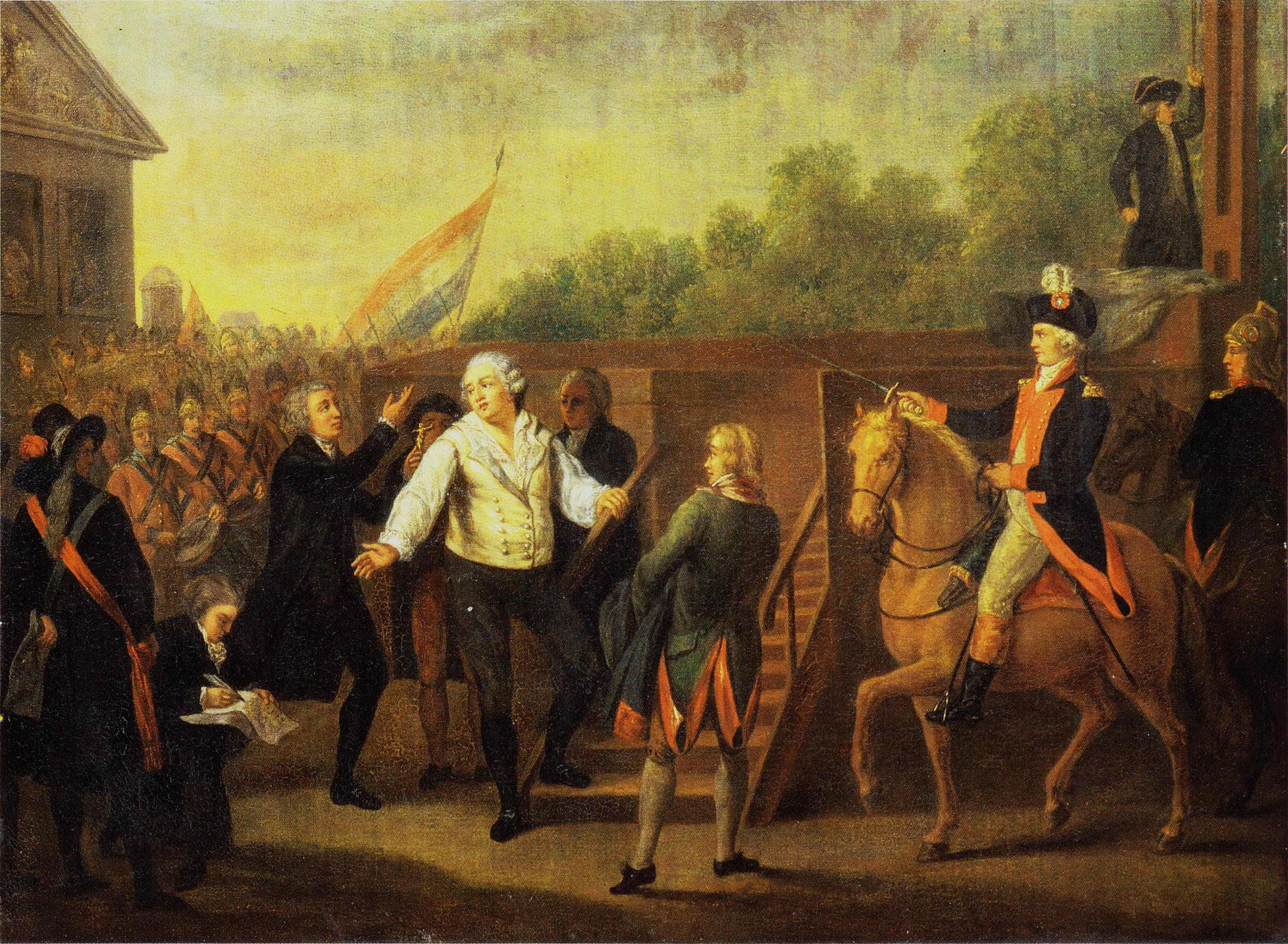
Louis XVI and Abbé Edgeworth de Firmont at the foot of the scaffold, 21 January 1793, by Charles Benazech (1793)

Louis entered a green carriage awaiting in the second court. The mayor of Paris, Nicolas Chambon, had ensured that the deposed king would not be taken in a tumbrel. He seated himself in it with the priest, with two militiamen sitting opposite them. The carriage left the Temple at approximately 9 a.m. to the sound of drums and trumpets. For more than an hour the carriage made its way through Paris, escorted by about 200 mounted gendarmes. The city had 80,000 men-at-arms (National Guardsmen, fédérés, and riflemen) occupying intersections, squares and posted along the streets, as well as cannons placed at strategic locations. Parisians came in large numbers to witness the execution, both on the route and at the site of the guillotine.

In the neighbourhood of the present-day rue de Cléry, the Baron de Batz, a supporter of the former royal family who had financed the flight to Varennes, had summoned 300 royalists to enable the former king's escape. Louis was to be hidden in a house in the rue de Cléry belonging to the Count of Marsan. The Baron leaped forward calling "Follow me, my friends, let us save the King!", but his associates had been denounced and only a few had been able to turn up. Three of them were killed, but de Batz managed to escape.

The convoy continued on its way along the boulevards and the rue de la Révolution (now rue Royale). Louis's carriage arrived at the Place de la Révolution at around 10:15 a.m., stopping in front of a scaffold installed between the Champs-Élysées and a pedestal, where a statue of his grandfather, Louis XV, had once stood until it had been toppled in 1792. The scaffold was placed in an empty space surrounded by guns and fédérés, with the people being kept at a distance. 20,000 men were deployed to guard the area.

== Execution ==
Execution of Louis XVI in a contemporary German engraving

Louis exited the carriage and was received by the executioner Charles-Henri Sanson, and then took off his frock coat and cravat. After initially refusing to permit Sanson and his assistants to bind his hands together, the former king was ultimately convinced by Edgeworth, and his own handkerchief was used instead of rope. The executioner's men then cut his hair and opened his shirt's collar. Accompanied by drum rolls, Louis climbed the stairs of the scaffold and joined Sanson and his four assistants on the platform.

After walking to the edge of the scaffold, Louis signaled to the drummers to stop and proclaimed his innocence to the crowd and expressed his concern for the future of France. He would have continued but a drum roll was ordered by Santerre, and the resulting noise made his final words difficult to understand. The order has also been attributed to others, including Santerre's aide-de-camp Dugazon, maréchal de camp Beaufranchet d'Ayat, and the drummer Pierrard. The executioners fastened Louis to the guillotine's bench (bascule), positioning his neck beneath the device's yoke (lunette) to hold it in place. At 10:22 a.m., the device was activated and the blade swiftly decapitated him. One of Sanson's assistants grabbed his severed head out of the receptacle into which it fell and exhibited it to the cheering crowd. Some of the spectators shouted "Long live the Nation!", "Long live the Republic!", and "Long live Liberty!", and gun salutes were fired while a few danced the farandole.

== Witness quotes ==
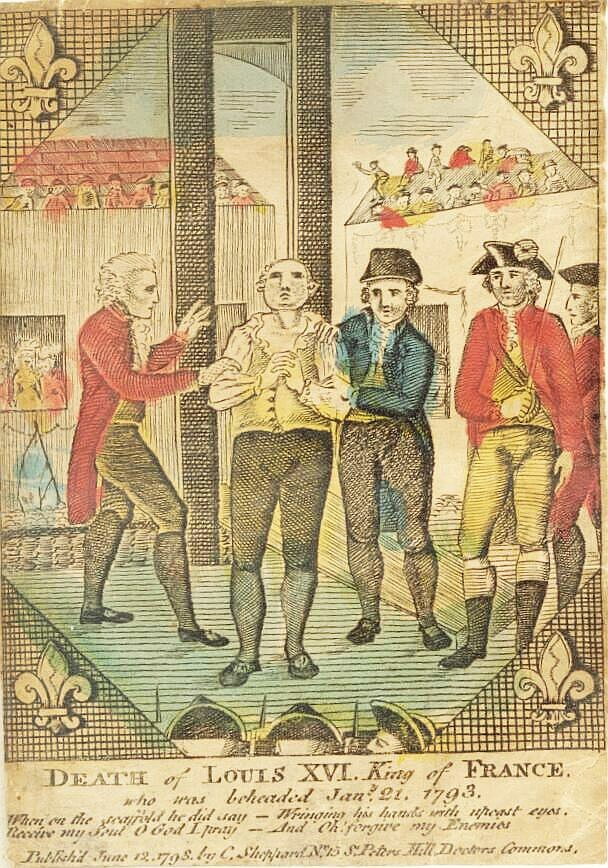
The death of Louis XVI, King of France, from an English engraving, published in 1798.

=== Henry Essex Edgeworth ===
Edgeworth, Louis's Irish confessor, wrote in his memoirs:

The path leading to the scaffold was extremely rough and difficult to pass; the King was obliged to lean on my arm, and from the slowness with which he proceeded, I feared for a moment that his courage might fail; but what was my astonishment, when arrived at the last step, I felt that he suddenly let go my arm, and I saw him cross with a firm foot the breadth of the whole scaffold; silence, by his look alone, fifteen or twenty drums that were placed opposite to me; and in a voice so loud, that it must have been heard at the Pont Tournant, I heard him pronounce distinctly these memorable words: "I die innocent of all the crimes laid to my charge; I Pardon those who have occasioned my death; and I pray to God that the blood you are going to shed may never be visited on France."

=== Charles-Henri Sanson's account ===
On the eve of the execution, Charles-Henri Sanson appears to have been deeply concerned about the events that were to follow. According to the later Memoirs of Sanson, Charles-Henri Sanson expected an attempt to rescue Louis XVI during the journey to the scaffold. He reportedly received anonymous letters warning that royalists intended to free the King and threatening him with death should he obstruct the attempt. Although no rescue was attempted, Sanson was accompanied by his brothers Louis-Cyr-Charlemagne and Martin, who were heavily armed.

Sanson responded to reports that Louis XVI had resisted the execution by publishing his own account in a letter dated 20 February 1793. Historian Reising argues that the letter reflects more than a factual account of the execution. She interprets Sanson's emphasis on Louis XVI's composure, innocence and religious conviction and relates them to the influence of Cesare Beccaria's ideas on justice and punishment. In the autograph letter Sanson wrote:

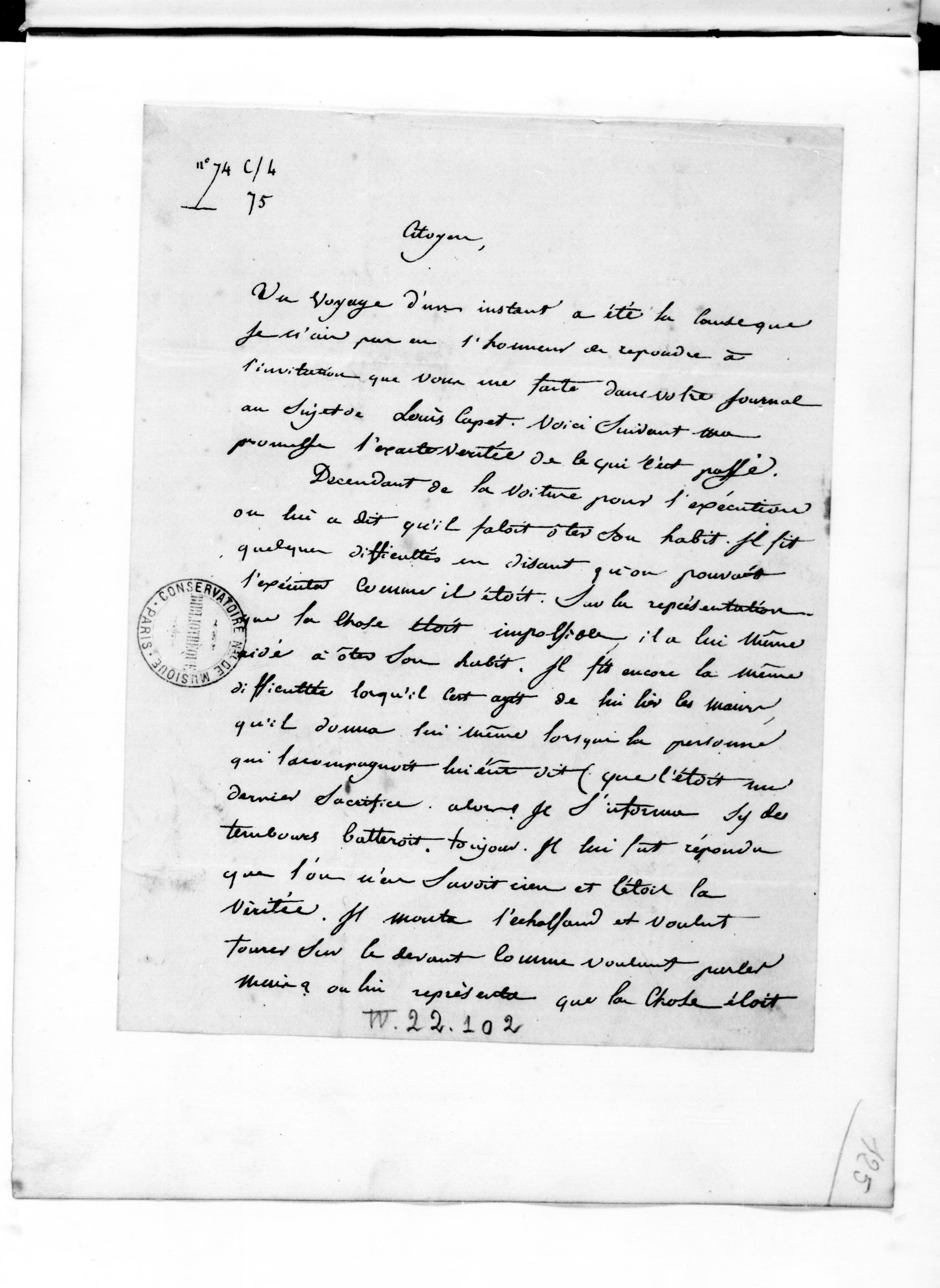
Autograph letter of Charles-Henri Sanson, 20 February 1793 (Bibliothèque nationale de France)

Arriving at the foot of the guillotine, Louis XVI looked for a moment at the instruments of his execution and asked Sanson why the drums had stopped beating. He came forward to speak, but there were shouts to the executioners to get on with their work. As he was strapped down, he exclaimed "My people, I die innocent!" Then, turning towards his executioners, Louis XVI declared "Gentlemen, I am innocent of everything of which I am accused. I hope that my blood may cement the good fortune of the French." The blade fell. It was 10:22 am. One of the assistants of Sanson showed the head of Louis XVI to the people, whereupon a huge cry of "Vive la Nation! Vive la République!" arose and an artillery salute rang out which reached the ears of the imprisoned Royal family.

In his letter, published in full in the Thermomètre du Jour of Thursday, 21 February 1793, Sanson emphasises that the King "bore all this with a composure and a firmness which has surprised us all. I remained strongly convinced that he derived this firmness from the principles of the religion by which he seemed penetrated and persuaded as no other man."

=== Jacques Roux ===
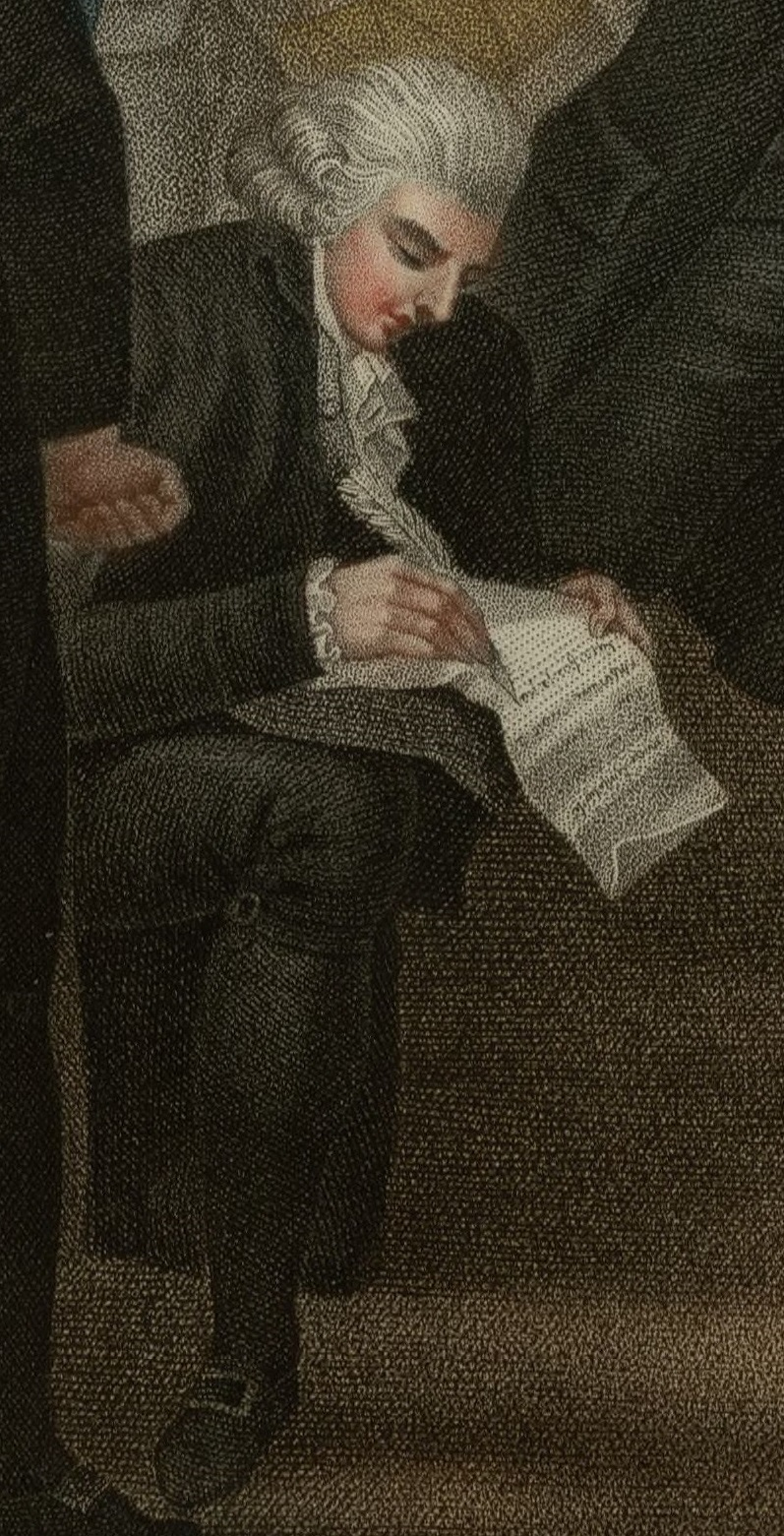
Jacques Roux drafting the report on the execution of Louis XVI. Detail from an engraving by J.-Frédéric Cazenave after a 1793 painting by Charles Benazech

Jacques Roux, a radical Enragé and member of the Paris Commune, was assigned to write a report on Louis's death. In his report, he wrote:

We [those assigned to lead Louis to the guillotine] went to the Temple. There we announced to the tyrant [Louis] that the hour of execution had arrived.

He asked to be alone for a few minutes with his confessor. He wanted to give us a package to turn over to you [the Paris Commune]; we made the observation that we were only charged with taking him to the scaffold. He answered: "This is proper." He turned the package over to one of our colleagues, asked that we look after his family, and asked that Cléry, his valet-de-chambre, be that of the queen; hurriedly he then said: "my wife." In addition, he asked that his former servants at Versailles not be forgotten. He said to Santerre: "Let us go." He crossed one courtyard on foot and climbed into a carriage in the second. On the way the most profound silence reigned.

Nothing of note happened. We went up to the office of the Marine to prepare the official report of the execution. Capet was never out of our sight up till the guillotine. He arrived at 10 hours 10 minutes; it took him three minutes to get out of the carriage. He wanted to speak to the people but Santerre wouldn't allow it. His head fell. The citizens dipped their pikes and their handkerchiefs in his blood.

Santerre is then quoted as saying:

We have just given you an exact account of what occurred. I have only praise for the armed force, which was extremely obedient. Louis Capet wanted to speak of commiseration to the people, but I prevented him so the king could receive his execution.

=== Leboucher ===
Speaking to Victor Hugo in 1840, a man called Leboucher, who had arrived in Paris from Bourges in December 1792 and was present at the execution of Louis XVI, recalled vividly:

Here are some unknown details. The executioners numbered four; two only performed the execution; the third stayed at the foot of the ladder, and the fourth was on the wagon which was to convey the King's body to the Madeleine Cemetery and which was waiting a few feet from the scaffold.

The executioners wore breeches, coats in the French style as the Revolution had modified it, and three-cornered hats with enormous tri-colour cockades.

They executed the King with their hats on, and it was without taking his hat off that Samson, [sic] seizing by the hair the severed head of Louis XVI., showed it to the people, and for a few moments let the blood from it trickle upon the scaffold.

=== Louis-Sébastien Mercier ===
In Le nouveau Paris, Mercier describes the execution of Louis XVI in these words:

... is this really the same man that I see being jostled by four assistant executioners, forcibly undressed, his voice drowned out by the drums, trussed to a plank, still struggling, and receiving the heavy blade so badly that the cut does not go through his neck, but through the back of his head and his jaw, horribly?

== Burial in the cemetery of the Madeleine ==
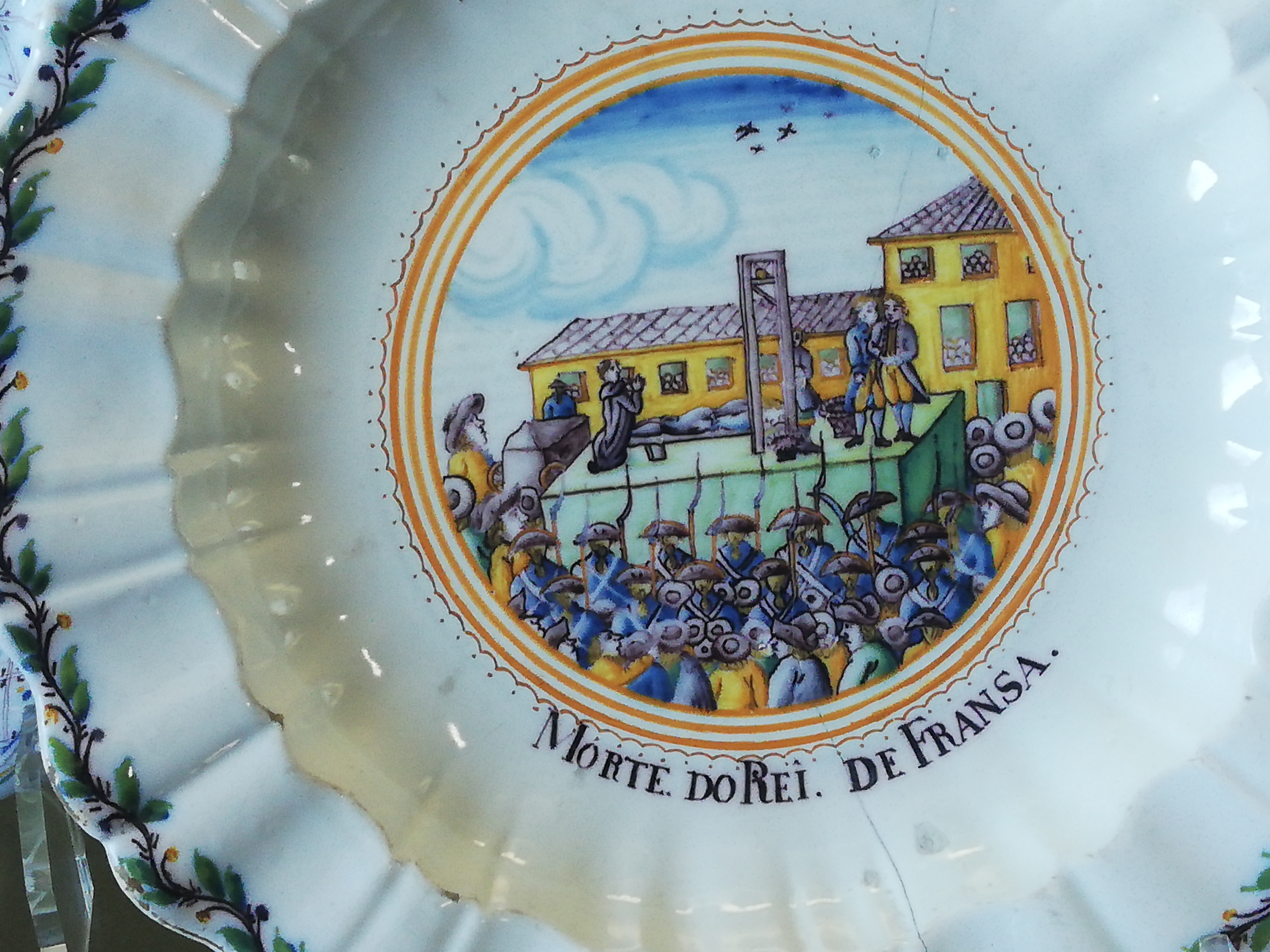
The execution depicted on a Portuguese plate (Museu Nacional de Arte Antiga)

The body of Louis XVI was immediately transported to the old Church of the Madeleine (demolished in 1799), since the legislation in force forbade burial of his remains beside those of his father, the Dauphin Louis de France, at Sens. Two vicars who had sworn fealty to the Revolution held a short memorial service at the church. One of them, Damoureau, stated in evidence:

Arriving at the cemetery, I called for silence. A detachment of Gendarmes showed us the body. It was clothed in a white vest and grey silk breeches with matching stockings. We chanted Vespers and the service for the dead. In pursuance of an executive order, the body lying in its open coffin was thrown onto a bed of quicklime at the bottom of the pit and covered by one of earth, the whole being firmly and thoroughly tamped down. Louis XVI's head was placed at his feet.

On 21 January 1815, during the First Bourbon Restoration, Louis XVI and his wife's remains were re-buried in the Basilica of Saint-Denis where in 1816 his brother, King Louis XVIII, had a funerary monument erected by Edme Gaulle.

== Jacques de Molay ==
A popular but apocryphal legend holds that as soon as the guillotine fell, an anonymous Freemason leaped on the scaffolding, plunged his hand into the blood, splashed drips of it onto the crown, and shouted, "Jacques de Molay, tu es vengé!" (usually translated as, "Jacques de Molay, thou art avenged"). De Molay (died 1314), the last Grand Master of the Knights Templar, had reportedly cursed Louis's ancestor Philip the Fair, after the latter had sentenced him to burn at the stake based on false confessions. The story spread widely and the phrase remains in use today to indicate "the triumph of reason and logic over religious superstition".

== Today ==
The area where Louis XVI and later (16 October 1793) Marie Antoinette were buried, in the cemetery of the Church of the Madeleine, is today the "Square Louis XVI" greenspace, containing the classically self-effacing Expiatory Chapel completed in 1826 during the reign of Louis's youngest brother Charles X. The crypt altar stands above the exact spot where the remains of the royal couple were originally laid to rest. The chapel narrowly escaped destruction on politico-ideological grounds during the violently anti-clerical period at the beginning of the 20th century.

== Bibliography ==
- Hugo, Victor, The Memoirs of Victor Hugo (1899)
- Necker, Anne Louise Germaine, Considerations on the principal events of the French Revolution (1818)
- Thompson, J.M., English Witnesses of the French Revolution (1938)

Paul and Pierrette Girault de Coursac have written a number of works on Louis XVI, including:

- Louis XVI, Roi Martyr (1982) Tequi
- Louis XVI, un Visage retrouvé (1990) O.E.I.L.
