= Trial of Louis XVI =

1792 trial of former French King Louis XVI during the French Revolution

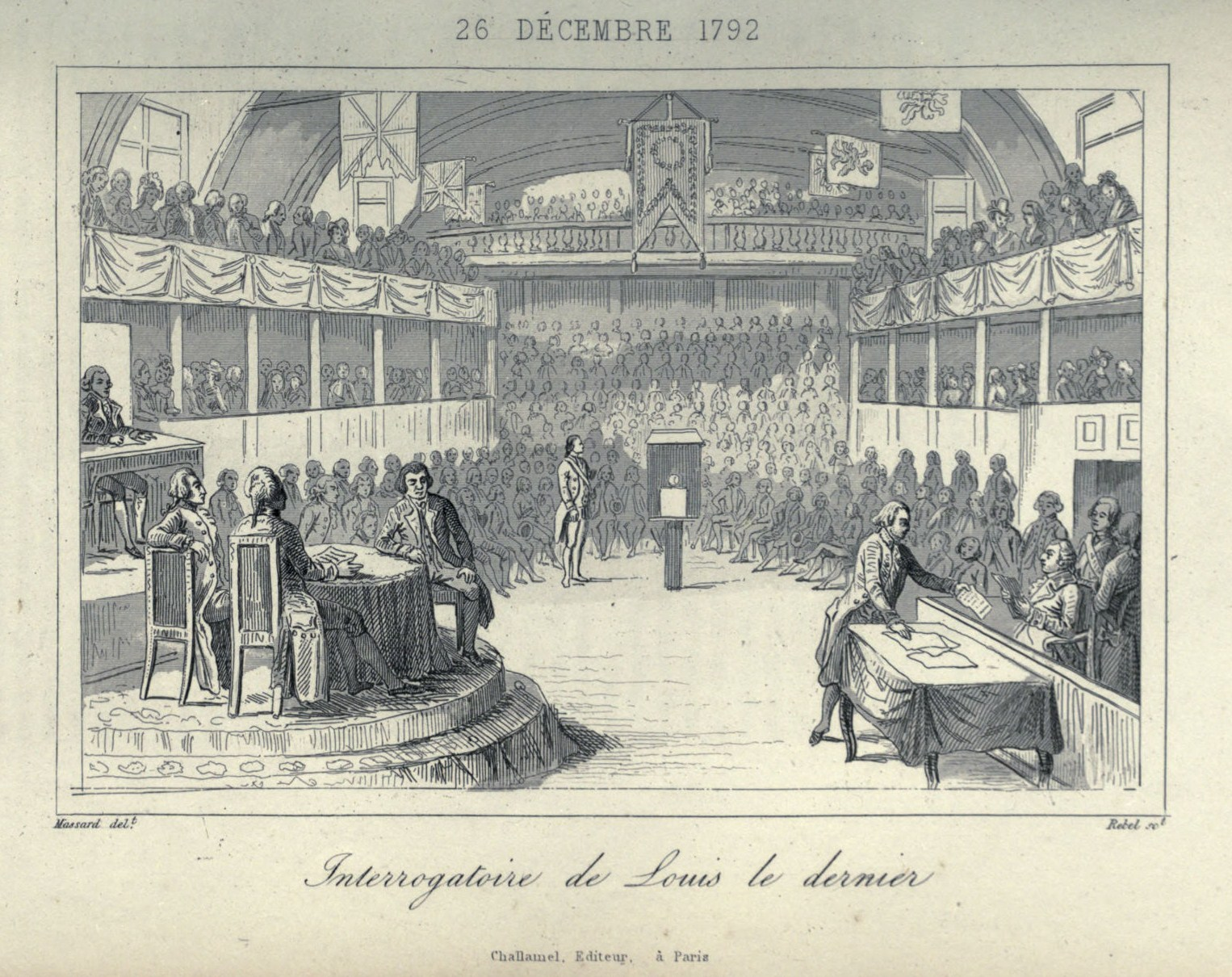
"Louis the Last" being cross-examined by the convention

The trial of Louis XVI—officially called "Citizen Louis Capet" since being dethroned—before the National Convention in December 1792 was a key event of the French Revolution. He was convicted of high treason and other crimes, resulting in his execution.

== December 1792 ==
The trial began on 3 December. On 4 December the convention's president Bertrand Barère presented it with the fatal indictment (drafted by Jean-Baptiste Robert Lindet) and decreed the interrogation of Louis XVI. Louis made his entrance into the Convention chamber then: "Louis", said Barère de Vieuzac, "the nation accuses you, the National Assembly decreed on 3 December that you would be judged by it; on 6 December, it decided that you would be brought to the dock. We shall read you the act giving the offenses with which you are charged...".

=== The charges ===
Louis was then read the charges by the convention's secretary, Jean-Baptiste Mailhe:

"Louis, the French Nation accuses you of having committed a multitude of crimes to establish your tyranny, in destroying her freedom."

1. On 20 June 1789, Louis shut down the Estates-General, resulting in the commoners (non-nobles, non-clergy) swearing not to disband. Mailhe characterized this as an attack on the sovereignty of the people. Louis's answer: "No laws were then existing to prevent me from it."
2. "You ordered an army to march against the citizens of Paris" and ceased only after the storming of the Bastille on 14 July 1789. Louis's answer: It was my right but "I never had an intention of spilling blood."
3. Despite promises made to the National Constituent Assembly, Louis refused to acknowledge the abolition of feudalism, as stated in the Declaration of the Rights of Man and of the Citizen. He invited troops to Versailles and feted them in a lavish banquet where the cockade of France was (purportedly) "trampled under foot" resulting in the insurrectionary Women's March on Versailles on 5 October 1789. Louis's answer: My refusals were just; I never saw the desecration of the cockade.
4. At Fête de la Fédération of 14 July 1790, Louis took an oath which Mailhe said he did not keep by conspiring with the counter-revolutionaries Antoine Omer Talon and Mirabeau. Louis's answer: I do not remember.
5. Louis is accused of disbursing millions to "effect this corruption" and planning escape. Louis's answer: "I felt no greater pleasure, than that of relieving the needy."
6. Louis planned to escape on the Day of Daggers on 28 February 1791 when hundreds of nobles with concealed weapons entered the Tuileries Palace and again when he wanted to visit Saint-Cloud 10 April 1790. Louis's answer: "Absurd."
7. Louis did attempt to escape to Varennes on 21 June 1791, protesting in writing the activities of the National Constituent Assembly. Louis's answer: Refer to what I told the assembly at that time.
8. That Louis was complicit in the Champ de Mars Massacre on 17 July 1791. Louis's answer: "I do know nothing of it."
9. Back in July 1791, the Declaration of Pillnitz was being drafted by Leopold II of Austria (brother of Queen Marie Antoinette) and Frederick William II of Prussia who "pledged themselves to re-erect in France the throne of the absolute monarchy, and you were silent on this convention till the moment when it was known by all Europe." Louis's answer: This is my minister's fault.
10. Louis supported the counter-revolutionary Arles rebellion. Louis's answer: I followed my ministers' advice.
11. When Avignon and the Comtat Venaissin were annexed to France following a referendum, Louis delayed and sent commissioners that supported its civil war. Louis's answer: I don't remember the delay and the fault lies in the commissioners, not me.
12. Louis did nothing about the counter-revolutions in Nîmes, Montauban, and Jalès (fr) until Saillant's rebellion. Louis's answer: This was done by my ministers.
13. Louis sent twenty-two battalions against the people of Marseille who were marching to subdue the counter-revolutionaries of Arles. Louis's answer: Provide written proof.
14. Louis received a letter from M. de Wittgenstein, Commandant General of the Army of Southern France (le Midi) asking for additional time to rally support for the throne. Louis's answer: I don't remember the letter and he doesn't work for me anymore.
15. Louis paid his former bodyguards even after they emigrated out of France to Coblentz along with other noble émigrés. Louis's answer: "I stopped paying the bodyguards after they emigrated. As for the nobles, I don't remember.
16. Louis's two exiled brothers, Louis Stanislas Xavier and Charles Philippe, both future French kings, are accused of raising regiments, borrowing money and contracting alliances to overturn the revolution. A letter signed by the two written to Louis is produced. Louis's answer: I disowned them once I became aware of their proceedings. I know nothing of this letter.
17. Louis is accused of neglecting the defense of the country by not providing sufficient men, money or arms and refusing the establishment of a camp of 20,000 near Paris. Louis's answer: The fault lies with my ministers.
18. A letter from Hippolyte-Jean-René de Toulongeon (fr) is produced that indicates Louis's approval of his emigration to Vienna. This is used as evidence that he encourages desertion to the service of his brothers. Louis's answer: "I know nothing of this; there is not a word true in this charge."
19. A letter from Choiseul-Gouffier, former ambassador to Constantinople, establishes Louis's desire for peace between Turkey and Austria so that Austria could use the Turkish border troops against France. Louis's answer: Choiseul-Gouffier is a liar.
20. The Prussians were advancing on France but Louis waited until 10 July 1792 to inform the Assembly. Louis's answer: I didn't know until then; my ministers were responsible.
21. Louis made Charles d'Abancour minister of war, a suspicious choice since he was the nephew of ex-Finance Minister Charles Alexandre de Calonne who had joined the anti-revolution émigré group at Coblenz. It was during D'Abancour's tenure that Longwy and Verdun were lost to the Prussians and émigrés. Louis's answer: I didn't know he was his nephew.
22. Louis is accused of destroying the French navy with his Secretary of Navy Bertrand de Molleville organizing the mass emigration of officers. When the Assembly accused Molleville, Louis replied he was "satisfied with his services." Louis's answer: "I have done all that I could to retain the Officers." A lack of proper complaint precluded me from removing him.
23. Louis is accused of having agents in the French colonies fomenting counter-revolution (see Haitian Revolution). Louis's answer: "I had nothing to do with [that]."
24. Louis is protecting fanatical internal enemies of France, aristocrats and "non-juring" clergy (those who refuse to take the Civil Constitution of the Clergy oath), so that he can restore the Ancien Régime. Louis's answer: "I know nothing of this project."
25. On 29 November 1791 the Assembly issued a decree that "non-juring" priests would no longer receive state funds. Louis vetoed this decree. Louis's answer: The constitution gave me the power to veto.
26. Anti-revolutionary disturbances from these "non-juring" clerics increase and Louis's ministers say they are not breaking the law. On 27 May 1792 the Assembly issues a decree allowing for the deportation of the clerics, if twenty "active citizens" (over the age of 25, paid direct taxes equal to three days' labor) request and the department concurs. Louis, again, vetoes. Louis's answer: The constitution gave me the power to veto.
27. The reputation of the King's bodyguards was poor, accused of anti-revolutionary sentiments. On 29 May 1792, the Assembly decreed their disbanding. Louis signed, if reluctantly. He is accused of writing the guards "a letter of satisfaction" and continuing to pay them. Louis's answer: I stopped paying them once new guards were appointed.
28. Louis kept the Swiss Guards among his bodyguards contrary to the constitution. The Assembly had expressly ordered their departure. Louis's answer: "I have executed all the decrees that have been enacted...."
29. Louis Collenot d'Angremont (fr) (first to be guillotined due to his activities on August 10) and a person going by the name of Gilles were counter-revolutionaries in the pay of Louis. Louis's answer: I have no knowledge. "The idea of counter-revolution never entered my head."
30. You tried to bribe, with considerable sums, several members of the Constituent and Legislative Assemblies; letters from Dufresne Saint-Léon and several others, which will be presented to you, establish this fact.
31. You allowed the French nation to be disgraced in Germany, in Italy, and in Spain, since you did nothing to exact reparation for the ill treatment which the French experienced in those countries.
32. On 10 August you reviewed the Swiss Guards at five o'clock in the morning; and the Swiss Guards fired first on the citizens.
33. You caused the blood of Frenchmen to flow.

=== Cross-examination ===
Louis XVI heard the 33 charges sitting in the armchair in which he had accepted the Constitution. After the secretary had read him the accusation act, Bertrand Barère de Vieuzac repeated each charge and questioned Louis XVI.

== The defense, 26 December 1792 ==
=== The defense team ===
Louis XVI sought the most illustrious legal minds in France as his defense team. He first asked Gui-Jean-Baptiste Target, former deputy of the National Constituent Assembly and hero of the Parlements of the ancien régime, to lead his defense, but the elderly lawyer refused on account of his age. The task of lead counsel fell to Raymond Desèze, who was assisted by François Denis Tronchet (Target's closest colleague, who came on board reluctantly, only at the King's insistence) and Guillaume-Chrétien de Lamoignon de Malesherbes (Louis XVI's former Secretary of State).

Though he had only two weeks to prepare his defense arguments, Desèze's brilliance so shone through in a first draft that, although it was moving, Louis rejected it as too rhetorical, saying, "I do not want to play on their (the Convention's) feelings".

When the time came to deliver the defense (26 December 1792), despite having had no sleep for over four days, he pleaded the king's case for three hours, arguing eloquently yet discreetly that the revolution spare his life. Beginning with a description of why the charges were invalid (under the terms of the Constitution of 1791 Louis, as king, was immune from prosecution), he attacked the right of National Convention to stand as judge and jury. Finally, he moved to a rejection of the charges in the acte enonciatif drawn up by the constitution charge by charge, with a royalist history of the revolution, portraying Louis as "the restorer of French Liberty". He finished, like many of the set-piece speeches of the revolution, with an appeal to history:

Louis ascended the throne at the age of twenty, and at the age of twenty he gave to the throne the example of character. He brought to the throne no wicked weaknesses, no corrupting passions. He was economical, just, severe. He showed himself always the constant friend of the people. The people wanted the abolition of servitude. He began by abolishing it on his own lands. The people asked for reforms in the criminal law... he carried out these reforms. The people wanted liberty: he gave it to them. The people themselves came before him in his sacrifices. Nevertheless, it is in the name of these very people that one today demands... Citizens, I cannot finish... I stop myself before History. Think how it will judge your judgement, and that the judgement of him will be judged by the centuries.

=== Declaration of Louis XVI in his defense ===
"You have heard my defense, I would not repeat the details. In talking to you perhaps for the last time, I declare that my conscience reproaches me with nothing, and my defenders have told you the truth. I never feared the public examination of my conduct, but my heart is torn by the imputation that I would want to shed the blood of the people and especially that the misfortunes of August 10th be attributed to me. I avow that the many proofs that I have always acted from my love of the people, and the manner in which I have always conducted myself, seemed to prove that I did not fear to put myself forward in order to spare their blood, and forever prevent such an imputation."

== The verdict, 14–15 January ==
Given overwhelming evidence of Louis' collusion with the invaders, the verdict was a foregone conclusion. Ultimately, 683 deputies voted to convict the former king. Not a single deputy voted "no," though 26 attached some condition to their votes. Twenty-six deputies were absent from the vote, most on official business. Twenty-three deputies abstained, for differing reasons. Several abstained because they felt they had been elected to make laws rather than to judge.

== The punishment, 16–21 January ==
=== The Mailhe amendment ===
For the king's sentence, deputy Jean-Baptiste Mailhe proposed "Death. I ask that, if this opinion passes, the Assembly discuss whether it would be in the public interest for the execution to take place immediately or to be postponed" which was supported by twenty-six deputies. This "Mailhe amendment" was regarded by some of Mailhe's contemporaries as a conspiracy to save the king's life. It was even suggested that Mailhe had been paid, perhaps by Spanish gold.

=== The vote ===
Paris voted overwhelmingly for death, 21 to 3. Robespierre voted first, and said "The sentiment that led me to call for the abolition of the death penalty is the same that today forces me to demand that it be applied to the tyrant of my country." Philippe Égalité, formerly the Duke of Orléans and Louis' own cousin, voted for his execution, a cause of much future bitterness among French monarchists.

There were 721 voters in total. 34 voted for death with attached conditions (23 of whom invoked the Mailhe amendment), 2 voted for life imprisonment in irons, 319 voted for imprisonment until the end of the war (to be followed by banishment). 361 voted for death without conditions, just carrying the vote by a marginal majority. Louis was to be put to death.

A subsequent vote, on the proposal that the sentence be respited, saw a vote of 380–286 in favour of immediate execution.

=== Announcement of verdict ===
On 20 January, the Assembly sent a delegation to the Temple Prison to notify Louis of the verdict and the refusal of a respited sentence. The delegation was led by Dominique Joseph Garat, the minister of Justice. He was accompanied by Jacques-René Hébert, deputy prosecutor of the Commune, and Chrétien Guillaume de Lamoignon de Malesherbes, Louis' lawyer.

Seeing the delegation approaching, the condemned king noticed his lawyer sobbing. Even before the announcement of the verdict, Louis said to him: "I have been expecting the outcome that your tears tell me; move on, my dear Malesherbes."

Garat announced the verdict and informed Louis that the sentence will be carried out in 48 hours. To everyone's surprise, Louis remained unfazed. Hébert, who has always despised and insulted the king in Le Père Duchesne, wrote later: "He listened to the reading of his sentence with an unusual composure. He displayed such unction, nobility and grandeur in his bearing and his words, that I could not contain myself. Tears of rage wetted my eyelids. He had in his eyes and his manners something visibly supernatural to man. I withdrew, wanting to hold back tears that flowed despite my efforts, fully resolved to bring my ministry to an end."

=== Louis' final requests and the response of the Assembly ===
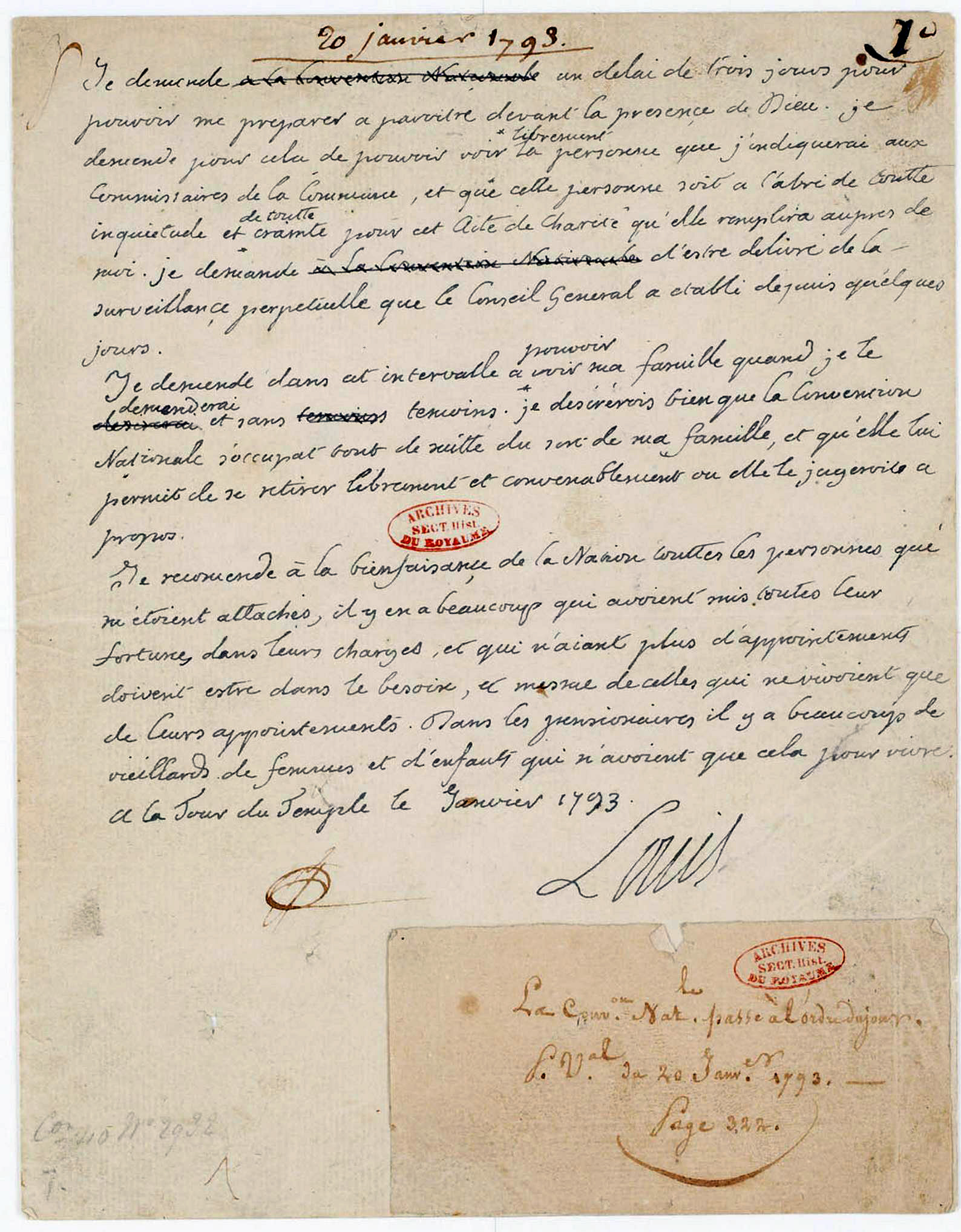
Autographed letter signed by Louis XVI dated 20 January, 1793 - National Archives, AE-II-1338

Having heard the verdict, Louis put forward several requests: he asked for a three-day delay of the execution to better prepare for death, the abbot Henry Essex Edgeworth to be brought to him, surveillance on him to be reduced, his family to come see him one last time 'in private and without witnesses', and that the nation takes care of those who were close to him.

He then wrote a letter to the Assembly:

I ask for a three-day delay so that I can prepare to appear before the presence of God. I ask to be able to freely see the person whom I will indicate to the Commissioners of the Commune, and that this person to be exempt from all worries and fears for performing this charitable act for me. I ask to be freed from the perpetual surveillance that the General Council has established for several days.

I ask during this period of time to be able to see my family when I ask and without witnesses. I would also like the Assembly to immediately take care of my family, to allow them to withdraw freely and in a fitting manner wherever the Assembly deems it appropriate.

I commend to the benevolence of the Nation all those persons who were attached to my service, many of them had put their entire fortunes into their offices, and now that they no longer receive their salaries, they must be in need, especially those who lived solely on those salaries. Among these pensioners, there are many elderly people, women and children who only had these pensions to live on.

To the Temple Tower, January 1793

[signed] Louis

The Assembly granted all requests except for the three-day delay.

=== Execution ===
Louis was guillotined on 21 January 1793 in the Place de la Révolution (renamed Place de la Concorde in 1795).

== Sources ==
- David P. Jordan, The King's Trial – Louis XVI vs. the French Revolution, University of California Press, 1979. ISBN 0-520-04399-5.
- Pfeiffer, Laura Belle (1913). The Uprising of June 20, 1792. University of Nebraska.
- Trapp, Joseph (1793). Proceedings of the French National Convention on the Trial of Louis XVI.
- Michael Walzer, Regicide and Revolution – Speeches at the Trial of Louis XVI, Columbia University Press, 1993. ISBN 978-0-231-08259-4.
