= Paul and Pierrette Girault de Coursac =

- Known for: Specialising in the lives of Louis XVI and Marie-Antoinette
- Scientific career
- Fields: History

Paul Girault de Coursac (4 December 1916 – 16 March 2001) and Pierrette Girault de Coursac (née Rachou; 11 November 1927 – 14 March 2010) were two French historians who specialised in the lives of Louis XVI and Marie Antoinette.

== Views ==
Their works over nearly 30 years write that the king was never governed by his wife. His education was intellectually very complete. He had several lines which he followed throughout his reign, such as preventing civil war and anything that might trigger it. He was never governed by his ministers, and during the French Revolution he pursued a consistent policy, playing the game that had been forced on him. Marie-Antoinette's policy during this period was followed without his knowledge. The letters requesting help from foreign sovereigns and presented as from him were fakes from the queen, and his entourage and the armoire de fer was a pure invention of certain revolutionaries.

== Works ==
- Marie-Antoinette et le scandale de Guines, Gallimard (1962)
- L'éducation d'un Roi, Louis XVI, Gallimard 1972, F.X. de Guibert (1995); ISBN 2-86839-374-8
- Louis XVI, Roi Martyr. Tequi (1982); ISBN 2-85244-209-4
- Enquête sur le procès du Roi Louis XVI. La Table Ronde (1982), F.X. de Guibert (1992); ISBN 2-86839-241-5
- Sur la Route de Varennes. La Table Ronde (1984), F.X. de Guibert (2000), (2007); ISBN 978-2-7554-0062-5
- Le Voyage de Louis XVI autour du monde. Expédition La Pérouse. La Table Ronde (1985), F.X. de Guibert (2000); ISBN 2-86839-633-X
- Louis XVI et la question religieuse pendant la révolution. OEIL (1988); ISBN 2-86839-137-0
- Louis XVI a la parole. Lettres, discours, écrits politiques. O.E.I.L. (1989), F.X. de Guibert (1997); ISBN 2-86839-468-X
- Entretiens sur Louis seize. O.E.I.L. (1990); ISBN 2-86839-178-8
- Louis XVI, un visage retrouvé. O.E.I.L. (1990); ISBN 2-86839-190-7
- Louis XVI et Marie-Antoinette : vie conjugale - vie politique. O.E.I.L. (1990); ISBN 2-86839-185-0
- Derniers messages de Louis XVI aux Français. O.E.I.L. (1991); ISBN 2-86839-236-9
- Guerre d'Amérique et liberté des mers 1778-1783. F.X. de Guibert (1991); ISBN 2-86839-312-8
- La dernière année de Marie-Antoinette. F.X. de Guibert (1993); ISBN 2-86839-290-3
- La défense de Louis XVI par Malesherbes, Tronchet et Desèze précédée du procès-verbal de l'interrogatoire du roi. In collaboration avec Jean-Marc Varaut. F.X. de Guibert (1993); ISBN 2-86839-248-2
- Septembre 1792 la mort organisée. F.X. de Guibert (1994); ISBN 2-86839-291-1
- Le secret de la Reine : la politique personnelle de Marie-Antoinette pendant la Révolution. F.X. de Guibert (1996); ISBN 2-86839-361-6
- Histoire, historiens et mémorialistes du règne de Louis XVI et de la Révolution. F.X. de Guibert (1997); ISBN 2-86839-499-X
- Provence et Artois : les deux frères de Louis XVI. F.X. de Guibert (1999); ISBN 2-86839-585-6
- Découverte. Bulletin du Comité pour l'étude de Louis XVI et de son procès. Revue trimestrielle publiée de 1973 à 1985.
- Louis XVII. Ouvrage collectif. Délégation à l'Action artistique de la ville de Paris (1987); ISBN 2-905118-01-6
- Louis XVI, du Serment du Sacre à l'Edit de Tolérance. Ouvrage collectif. Bibliothèque Historique de la Ville de Paris et l'Association Louis XVI (1988); ISBN 2-7299-0066-7

== See also ==
- Declaration of Louis XVI to all the French, on his departure from Paris
- Florimond de Mercy-Argenteau
