= Jean-Baptiste Mailhe =

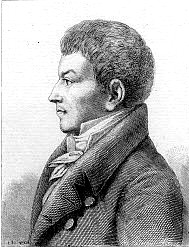

Member of the National Convention
- In office 20 September 1792 – 26 October 1795
- Constituency: Haute-Garonne

Member of the Council of Five Hundred
- In office 15 October 1795 – 4 September 1797
- Constituency: Hautes-Pyrénées

Member of the Legislative Assembly
- In office 1 October 1791 – 20 September 1792
- Constituency: Haute-Garonne

Personal details
- Born: 8 April 1752 Guizerix, Bigorre, France
- Died: 1 June 1834 (aged 82) Paris, France
- Party: La Plaine, Club de Clichy
- Occupation: Lawyer, politician
- Known for: Proposing the "Mailhe amendment" during the Trial of Louis XVI

Jean-Baptiste Mailhe, born Jean Mailhe (8 April 1752 – 1 June 1834), was a French politician of the French Revolution. A lawyer by training, he was a deputy to the Legislative Assembly and the National Convention, where he played a key role in the Trial of Louis XVI. His motion to sentence the king to death while allowing for a potential reprieve, known as the "Mailhe amendment", revealed emerging divisions among the deputies during the trial. He was later elected to the Council of Five Hundred and was proscribed under the Directory after the Coup of 18 Fructidor, before returning to France following the Coup of 18 Brumaire.

== Life ==
=== Early life and career ===
Born into a bourgeois family in Guizerix (in the former province of Bigorre), Jean Mailhe studied law at the University of Toulouse and became a lawyer (avocat) at the parlement of Toulouse.

Between 1777 and 1784, Mailhe was active in the Académie des Jeux floraux, a prestigious literary society in Toulouse, where he associated with Bertrand Barère and received four awards for his work.

=== Legislative Assembly ===
In September 1791, Mailhe, then procureur-syndic for the department of Haute-Garonne, was elected as a deputy to the National Legislative Assembly, the second of twelve for his department. In April 1792, he voted to grant honours to the soldiers of the Châteauvieux regiment, who had been involved in the Nancy affair. In August, he voted in favour of the indictment of the Marquis de La Fayette. During his term, he joined the Jacobin Club and served as its president in March 1792.

=== National Convention ===
Following the insurrection of 10 August 1792, the monarchy was overthrown, and new elections were held. In September 1792, Mailhe was re-elected to the newly formed National Convention as the first of twelve deputies for Haute-Garonne. He sat with the moderate deputies of The Plain (La Plaine). At the start of the session, he was appointed commissioner to the National Archives, a substitute member of the Diplomatic Committee, and a member of the Committee of Legislation.

==== The Trial of Louis XVI ====
As a member of the Committee of Legislation, Mailhe was tasked with reporting on the legal questions surrounding the trial of the former king. In his report of 7 November 1792, he argued that Louis XVI could be tried by the Convention, asserting that the constitutional inviolability of the monarch was a gift from the people that the people could revoke. This report laid the legal groundwork for the Trial of Louis XVI.

During the votes on the king's sentence in January 1793, Mailhe cast his vote with the significant amendment: "Death. I ask that, if this opinion passes, the Assembly discuss whether it would be in the public interest for the execution to take place immediately or to be postponed". His "Mailhe amendment" was seen by the Montagnards as a veiled attempt to save the king.

==== Missions and later activities ====
Mailhe was often absent from Paris on official missions as a représentant en mission. On 8 March 1793, he was sent to the Paris sections of Lepeletier and Panthéon alongside Lazare Carnot and Robert Lindet. The next day, he was dispatched to the departments of Aude and Haute-Garonne to accelerate the mass conscription.

He was absent for the votes on the indictment of Jean-Paul Marat and the reinstatement of the Commission of Twelve. He was not in Paris during the fall of the Girondins. After the Coup of 9 Thermidor, his presence in the Convention became more frequent. During his missions to Côte-d'Or and Yonne in early 1795, he adopted a strong anti-Jacobin stance.

=== Directory and later life ===
In 1795, Mailhe was elected to the Council of Five Hundred as a deputy for Hautes-Pyrénées and joined the royalist-leaning Club de Clichy, advocating an amnesty for émigrés. After the Coup of 18 Fructidor, he was proscribed and fled to Hamburg. He returned to France following Napoleon Bonaparte's Coup of 18 Brumaire and the subsequent amnesty of 13 Nivôse Year VIII. He resumed his legal career in Paris but held no further public office, refusing a post as secretary-general of the prefecture of Hautes-Pyrénées.

As a regicide, Mailhe was exiled again during the Bourbon Restoration by the law of 1816. He settled in Brussels, where he continued to practice law, and was allowed to return to France after the July Revolution of 1830. He died in Paris in 1834.

== Writings ==
- Seconde lettre a M. l'abbé de Barthe, prêtre, chanoine, professeur royal, & doyen de la faculté de théologie de Toulouse, conseiller en la chambre souveraine du clergé, prieur, seigneur de Sescairoles (1789).
- Réquisitoire fait par M. Mailhe, procureur-général-syndic du département de la Haute-Garonne, le 2 octobre 1790, devant messieurs les administrateurs composant le directoire de ce département (1790).
- Instruction de M. Mailhe, procureur-général-syndic, aux citoyens du Département de Haute-Garonne, relativement aux assemblées primaires (1790).
- Discours prononcé sur l'autel de la patrie, par M. Mailhe avec le serment civique, & les addresses à l'Assemblée nationale & au Roi (1790).
- Adresse de monsieur le procureur-général-syndic à messieurs les curés, vicaires, desservans, & au bon peuple du département de Haute-Garonne, sur la constitution du Clergé (1790).
- Rapport sur les clubs et sociétés populaires, fait à la Convention nationale, au nom des Comités de Salut public, de Sûreté générale & de Législation, par Mailhe, député du département de la Haute-Garonne, dans la séance du 6 fructidor, an 3 (1795).

== Bibliography ==
- Caratini, Roger (1988). Dictionnaire des personnages de la Révolution. Le pré aux Clercs. p. 580. ISBN 2714422322.
- Robert, Adolphe; Cougny, Gaston (1891). Dictionnaire des parlementaires français (in French). Vol. 4. p. 234.
- Taillefer, Michel (2014). "Mailhe franc-maçon". Études sur la sociabilité à Toulouse et dans le Midi toulousain de l'Ancien régime à la Révolution. Méridiennes (in French). Toulouse: Presses universitaires du Midi. pp. 483–488. ISBN 978-2-81070310-4.
