= Guizerix =

- Commune
- Coat of arms
- Location of Guizerix
- Location within France Location within Occitanie
- Coordinates: 43°19′29″N 0°26′51″E
- Country: France
- Region: Occitania
- Department: Hautes-Pyrénées
- Arrondissement: Tarbes
- Canton: Les Coteaux
- Intercommunality: Pays de Trie et du Magnoac
- Area^{1}: 7.2 km^{2} (2.8 sq mi)
- Elevation: 300 m (980 ft)
- Highest elevation: 307 m (1,007 ft)
- Lowest elevation: 217 m (712 ft)
- Population (2023): 112
  - Density: 16/km^{2} (40/sq mi)
- Time zone: UTC+01:00 (CET)
  - Summer (DST): UTC+02:00 (CEST)
- INSEE/Postal code: 65213 /65230
- ^{1} French Land Register data, which excludes lakes, ponds, glaciers > 1 km^{2} (0.386 sq mi or 247 acres) and river estuaries.

Guizerix is a commune in the Hautes-Pyrénées department in south-western France.

== Geography ==
The Petite Baïse forms most of the commune's eastern border.

== See also ==
- Communes of the Hautes-Pyrénées department
