= Jean-Chrysostôme Calès =

French military officer (1769–1853)

Jean-Chrysostôme Calès Baron d'Empire
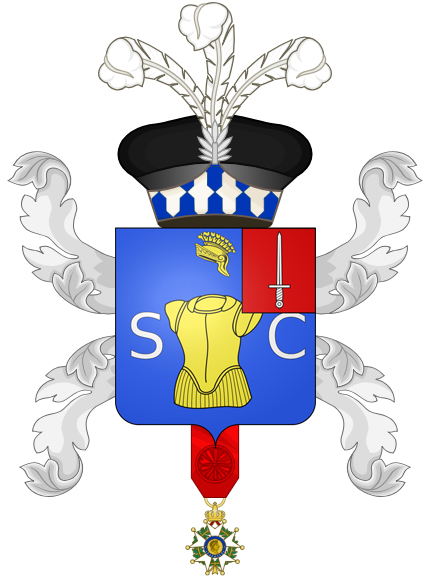
- Baronial arms of Jean-Chrysostôme Calès
- Born: 27 January 1769; Caraman, Haute-Garonne; Kingdom of France
- Died: 21 April 1853 (aged 84); Cessales, Haute-Garonne; France
- Military career
- Service years: 1792–1810; France
- Rank: Colonel
- Commands: 96th Line Infantry Regiment; 4th Line Infantry Regiment; 5th Haute-Garonne Volunteer Battalion
- Conflicts: French Revolutionary Wars; Napoleonic Wars
- Awards: Chevalier of the Legion of Honor; Officer of the Legion of Honor; Baron of the Empire
- Other work: Deputy at the Chamber of Representatives for Haute-Garonne

Jean-Chrysostôme Calès (French pronunciation: [ʒɑ̃ kʁi.zo.stom ka.lɛs]) was a French military officer who served during the French Revolutionary Wars and the Napoleonic Wars. He was born on 27 January 1769 in Caraman (Haute-Garonne) and died on 21 April 1853 in Cessales (Haute-Garonne).

== Biography ==
Jean-Chrysostôme Calès, « son of Jean Calès, alderman of Caraman, and of damsel Jeanne Rochas » was born on 27 January 1769 in Caraman, a small village in the region of Lauragais near Toulouse. Jean-Chrysostôme was the fourth brother of 10 siblings, and had two sisters and seven brothers. Several of his siblings were also prominent, including Jean-Marie Calès (1757-1834), the eldest, who became deputy of Haute-Garonne at the National Convention and the Council of Five Hundred, the second oldest, Jean Calès (1764-1840), who became Inspector-General of military hospitals, and the fifth oldest, Jean Joseph Etienne Victorin Calès (1772-1853), who became a military officer. His parents were landowners of the region, from old Protestant families rooted in the region and forced to convert to Catholicism after the revocation of the Edict of Nantes issued by King Louis XIV in 1685.

=== Service in the French Revolutionary Armies (1792-1804) ===
Jean-Chrysostôme Calès entered military service at the beginning of the wars of the French Revolution, at the age of 23, on 10 March 1792, as Lieutenant in the 5th battalion of volunteers of Haute-Garonne. This battalion, formed by 455 volunteers from the districts of Toulouse, Rieux, Villefranche, Castelsarrasin, Muret, Saint-Gaudens, Revel and Grenade, and gathered in Toulouse, was amalgamated on 1st Messidor Year III (19 June 1795) with Regiments of the Ancien Régime within the 130th demi-brigade of line infantry, itself reformed as 4th demi-brigade of line infantry on 22 Ventôse Year IV (12 March 1796) to put order in the confusion of the infantry corps, and then finally renamed 4th Infantry regiment of line on 1st Vendémiaire an XII (24 September 1803) by decree of the First Consul. Lieutenant Jean-Chrysostôme Calès served this 5th battalion of volunteers within the 7th Company of Villefranche with his younger brother, Captain Jean Joseph Etienne Victorin Calès.

Lieutenant Calès left Toulouse with his battalion of volunteers in May 1792 for the Army of the Alps, one of the French Revolutionary armies, and was appointed Captain on 19 September 1792, the day before the victory of the French troops at the battle of Valmy (20 September), and two days before the inaugural parliamentary session (21 September) of the National Convention, in which his elder brother Jean-Marie was elected and which proclaimed the French First Republic (22 September).

==== In the Army of the Eastern Pyrenees (1794) ====
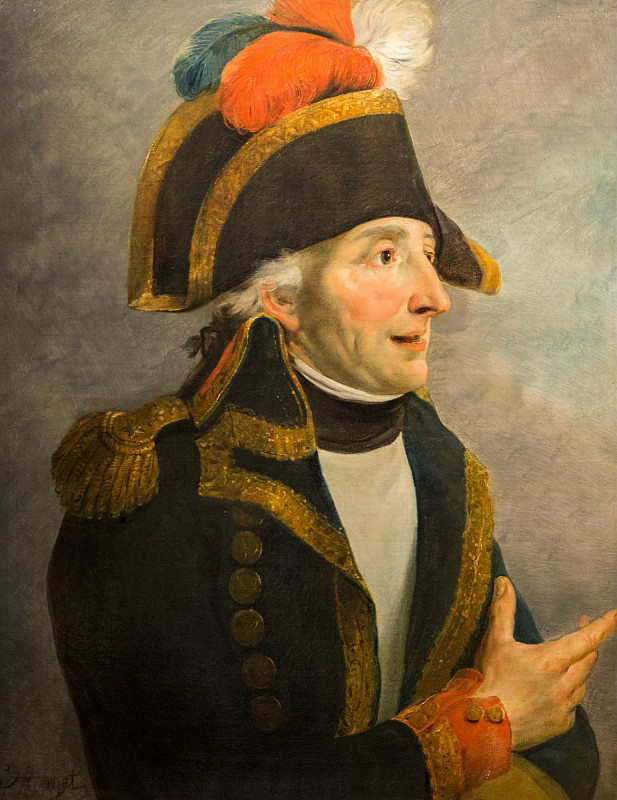
General Dugommier, commander of the Army of the Eastern Pyrenees, was killed on 18 November 1794 at the Battle of the Black Mountain, where Captain Calès distinguished himself (by Georges Rouget, 1835)

Captain Calès entered on Year II (during the reign of Terror), the Army of the Eastern Pyrenees, formed by the Convention after the invasion of France by the Kingdom of Spain in April 1793 in retaliation for the execution of Louis XVI just three months before. Calès particularly distinguished himself the 27 Brumaire Year III (17 November 1794) at the Battle of the Black Mountain (also called Battle of the Sierra Negra) against the allied armies of the kingdoms of Spain and Portugal: at the head of two companies of Chasseurs, captain Calès overthrew 800 Spaniards. General Jacques François Dugommier died during the battle, but he defeated the allied armies. The famous surgeon Larrey also distinguished himself during this battle practising in one day not less than 200 amputations. This decisive French victory led to the capture of Figueres, then to the victorious Siege of Roses and to the escape of the Spanish troops by sea, and finally to the signature of the Peace of Basel between France and Prussia (5 April 1795) and between France and Spain (22 July 1795 - 4 Thermidor Year III), by which the two countries signed peace with the victorious revolutionary France, thus abandoning the First Coalition. However, Calès got wounded during the blockade of Figueres on 29 November by the explosion of a gunpowder magazine.

==== In the Army of Italy (1796) ====
At the beginning of 1796, captain Calès was sent to the Army of Italy commended by the young General in Chief Bonaparte, invested on 2 March 1796 by the Directory, the new republican regime, in which his elder brother Jean-Marie was elected a few months before representative at the Council of Five Hundred. In September 1795, this Army of Italy had received four divisions (16,000 men) of reinforcements from the victorious Army of the Eastern Pyrenees. With these reinforcements, this small army, with a strength of 50,000 men, was composed in large majority of battalions of volunteers coming from Southern France. It was intended in principle to open a simple front of diversion against Austria, while the two more powerful armies of the Rhine, the Army of Sambre and Meuse commended by General Jourdan and the Army of the Rhine and Moselle of General Moreau, were sent to circumvent the Austrians by the north.

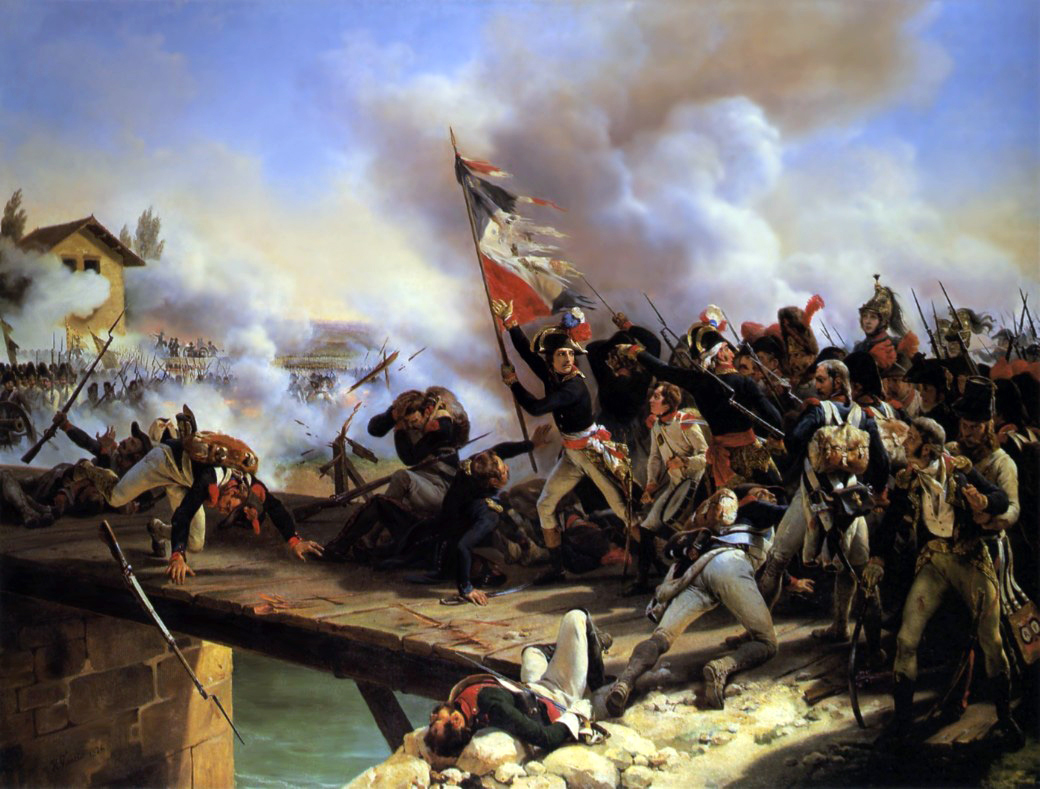
General Bonaparte at « The Crossing of the Arcole Bridge », (by Horace Vernet, 1826). Captain Calès and his 4th Regiment fought at this famous battle of the campaign of Italy on 15–17 November 1796.

Following the plan of a lightning offensive meditated by General Bonaparte for a long time, the 4th line infantry regiment of Calès (General Augereau's Division) fought at the battles of the bridge of Lodi (10 May 1796), Castiglione (5 August), Bassano (8 September), the bridge of Arcole (15-17 November) and Rivoli (13-14 January 1797).

At the Battle of Castiglione, captain Calès got shot in the right arm: the enemy was on the point of breaking on the left when Calès succeeded in rallying the 3rd battalion he commanded, repulsed the Austrians, and the French troops took back their positions. Although this battle, won by the French commanded by Generals Bonaparte, Massena and Augereau against three Austrian armies of Habsburg Austria, was not decisive, it is nevertheless considered by historians to be the most important battle regarding the victorious fate of the Italian campaign during the war of the First Coalition.

==== In the Armies of the West, of Batavia, and of the Rhine (1800) ====
The 4th regiment returned to France at the beginning of the year 1798, but did not, however, follow General Bonaparte in his campaign of Egypt and Syria conducted between 1798 and 1801. From Year VI to Year IX, captain Calès served in the Army of the West, the Army of Batavia and the Army of the Rhine. Specifically, Calès served during the campaign of Switzerland, on 3 and 9 May 1800, at the battles of Engen and Biberach (during the war of the Second Coalition). On 13 Floreal Year VIII (3 May 1800), at the Battle of Engen, while his demi-brigade was being enveloped by the enemy's cavalry, captain Calès succeeded in opening a passage, and, although wounded, he did not leave his service. This battle, fought between France and Austria, resulted in the victory of the French army commanded by General Jean Victor Marie Moreau against the Austrians commanded by General Paul Kray. Six days later, on 19 Floreal Year VIII (9 May 1800), at the Battle of Biberach, Calès commanded the battalion of the reunited Grenadiers: he repulsed the enemy and seized two pieces of cannon. The French corps commanded by General Laurent Gouvion Saint-Cyr won the battle against a part of the Habsburg Austrian Army commanded by General Paul Kray. On 15 July 1800, Moreau signed with Kray the armistice of Parsdorf. Recalled to France, the 4th demi-brigade crossed the Rhine at Kehl and arrived in Nancy in August 1801.

=== Service in the Great Army (1804-1810) ===
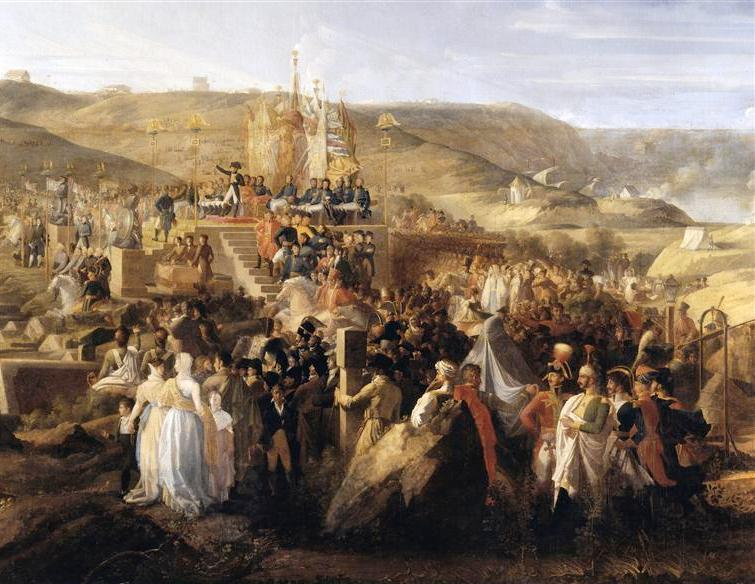
Napoleon I distributes the crosses of the Legion of Honor in the camp of Boulogne on 16 August 1804 (Philippe-Auguste Hennequin - Palais de Versailles)

==== In the Camp of Boulogne (1804) ====
Captain Calès was sent to the Camp of Boulogne (established near Boulogne-sur-Mer in 1803), where General Bonaparte, now head of the government since 1799 and First Consul for Life since 1802, assembled for the first time his famous « Grande Armée » (or Army of the Ocean Coasts), to plan an invasion of the United Kingdom.

There, captain Calès was appointed member of the Legion of Honor (Légionnaire, renamed Chevalier (Knight) a few years later) on 25 Prairial Year XII (14 June 1804). Napoleon Ier, newly proclaimed Emperor of the French (18 May 1804), decorated Calès in the camp of Boulogne the 16 August 1804, on the occasion of the very first military légion d'honneur decoration ceremony in French history. Captain Calès was also promoted battalion Commander in the 4th Infantry regiment of line of the Grande Armée on 3 Germinal Year XIII (24 March 1805).

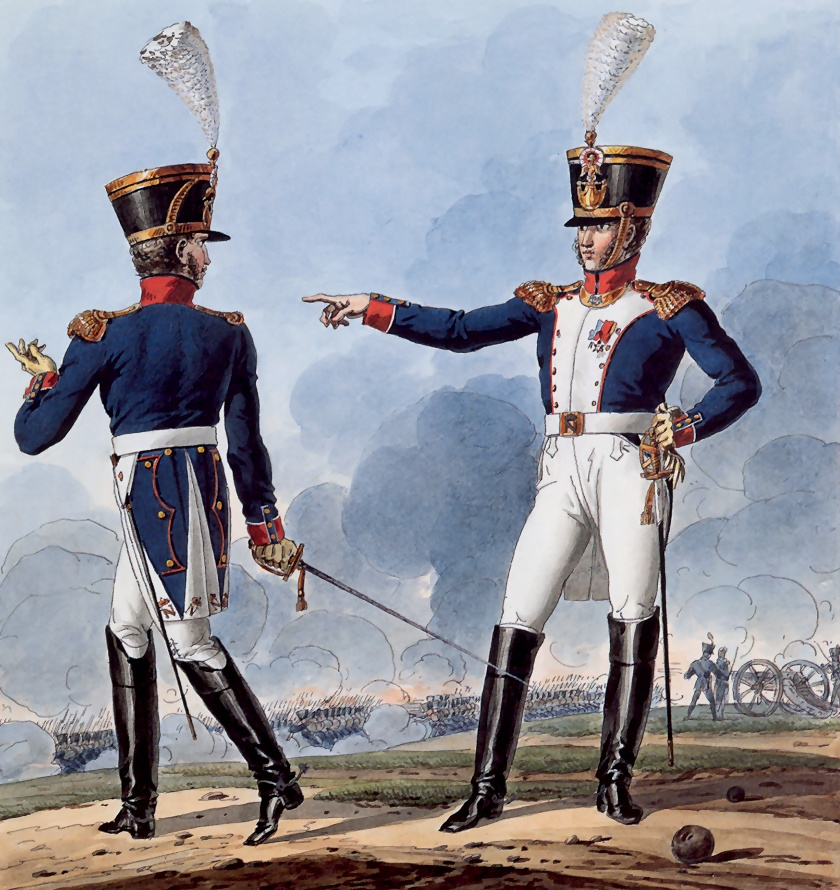
Battalion Commander (on the left: left epaulette with thick fringes, right epaulette without fringes) & Colonel (on the right: two epaulettes with thick fringes) of the Grande Armée - Line Infantry - 1812 (by Carle Vernet, La Grande Armée de 1812)

He served in the famed IV Corps commended by Marchal Soult, under the orders of Colonel Joseph Bonaparte (Napoleon's elder brother, and later King of Naples and Sicily and of Spain) first, and soon later, under the orders of Colonel Louis-Léger Boyeldieu (fr). At the head of the 3rd battalion of reserve, Calès did not take part, however, in the first battles of the campaign of Austria (1805) (Battles of Ulm and Austerlitz) and stationed in the camps of Nancy (June 1805), Schiltigheim (March 1806) and Strasbourg (January, May, July 1806).

==== Campaigns of Prussia (1806) and Poland (1807) ====
Battalion Commander Calès was finally sent to combat in October 1806 and fought during the campaigns of Prussia (1806) and Poland (1807). He did not, however, participate neither to the famous battle of Jena, nor to that of Auerstedt (both conducted in parallel on 14 October 1806 and where the Prussian army was swept by the French troops), because the Division Leval, which included his 4th regiment, could not arrive on time at Jena. He distinguished himself however at the fight of Bergfried (3 February 1807), a prelude to the battle of Eylau:

« The battle of Bergfried has made the greatest honour to General Leval. Generals Schiner and Viviès, Colonel Boyeldieu, Commanders Reboul and Calès distinguished themselves there; men have shown there the greatest value »

— Marchal Soult, commander of the IV Corps.

Colonel Boyeldieu, wounded by a shot on the left buttock in the course of the affair, continued to command the 4th regiment until nightfall; however, the next day, he was obliged to leave its direction to Commander Calès, who commended it «with bravery» at the famous battle of Eylau (7-8 February 1807). The arrival of his regiment (within Division Leval) proved decisive and forced the Russians to withdraw from the first day of the battle.

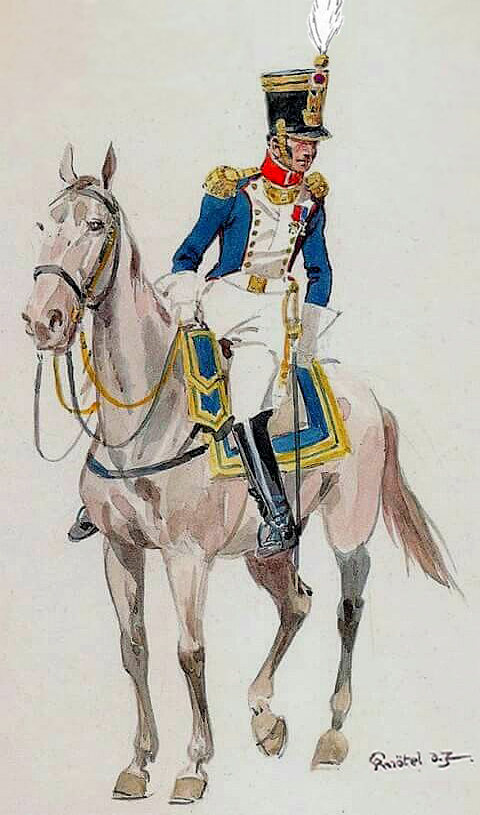
Colonel of a Line Infantry Regiment in the Grande Armée (by Richard Knötel)

Battalion Commander Calès was consequently promoted Colonel on 14 February 1807, the day following Colonel Boyeldieu's return, and took over command of the 96th Infantry Regiment (the historic Régiment de Nassau, in which celebrated French poet Guillaume Apollinaire will fight a century later, in 1915 during WWI, as a sous-lieutenant). Calès then served in the famed I Corps commended by Marchal Victor, and was commanding three battalions and about 4,000 soldiers in this 96th Infantry Regiment.

Colonel Calès notably commanded the 96th Regiment at the famous battle of Friedland on 14 June 1807, where the French army commanded by Napoleon obtained a spectacular victory over the Russian army led by Count Levin August von Bennigsen. This decisive victory was marked, by the signature of the treaties of Tilsit (7 and 9 July 1807) by Emperor Napoleon I and Tzar Alexander I, the end of the war of the Fourth Coalition and the beginning of a short period of peace in Europe.

Colonel Calès was made Officer of the Legion of Honor (Officier de la Légion d'Honneur) on the following 11 July (1807).

==== Campaign of Spain (1808) ====
In September 1808, Colonel Calès and his regiment were reassigned to the Army of Spain, still within the I Corps commanded by Marchal Victor, to take part to the Spanish War. At the Battle of the Sommosierra Pass on 30 November, the 96th Infantry Regiment was one of the most severely tested corpses, with about ten soldiers killed, forty wounded, and three wounded officers, including Colonel Calès, who got shot at his right leg. The victory of the French troops opened the road to Madrid. Calès got severely shot a second time in his leg during a deadly assault on 28 July 1809 at the Battle of Talavera (some 120 kilometres southwest of Madrid), one of the most bloody battles of the Spanish War, which cost about 7,000 lives in total to each camp.

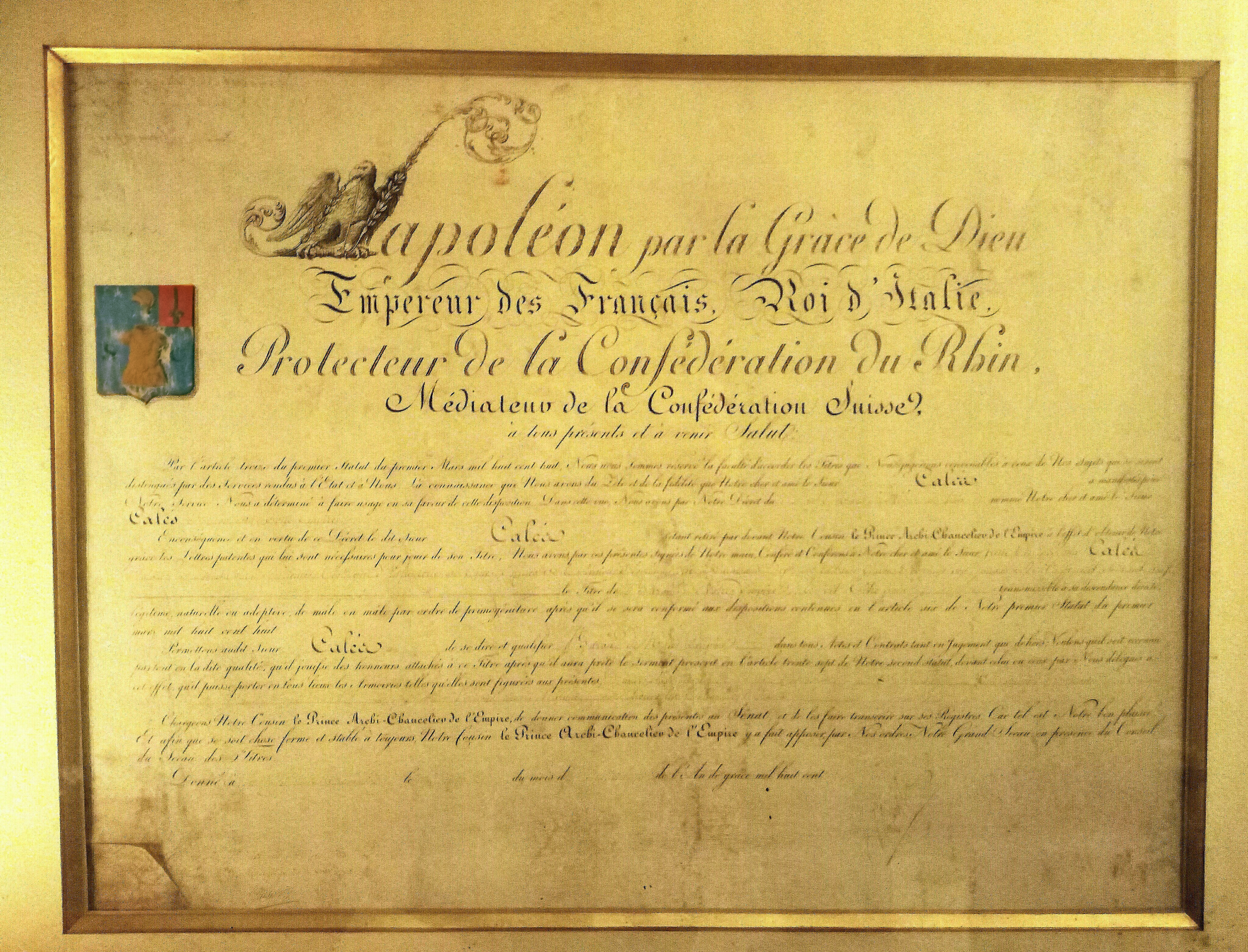
Letters patent - Patent of Baron of the Empire of Jean-Chrysostôme Calès, Colonel in the 96th Infantry Regiment of the Grande Armée - signed by Napoleon

He was created Baron of the Empire by the Emperor Napoleon I, on 15 August 1809. A very small number of Colonels was appointed to this nobility rank, which was generally reserved for Generals, Mayors of large cities, and Bishops. Between 1808 and 1814, 1,090 titles of barons were created.

Admitted to retirement on 15 May 1810, he left the Army on the following 1 July, and retired to Cessales (Haute-Garonne), from where he witnessed the abdication of Emperor Napoleon I, his forced exile on the island of Elba, and the return of King Louis XVIII (1st Restoration) in April 1814.

=== Election at the Chamber of Hundred Days (1815) ===
After Napoleon's return to Paris in March 1815, and the organization of parliamentary elections on 8–22 May 1815, the Baron Calès was elected, on 16 May 1815, at the Chamber of Hundred Days by the arrondissement of Villefranche-de-Lauragais (Haute-Garonne). He was one of the eleven colonels of the Grande Armée sitting in this chamber. But following Napoleon's severe defeat at the Battle of Waterloo on 18 June 1815, and his second abdication four days later, the Chamber was dissolved on 13 July 1815, by order of Louis XVIII.

Jean-Chrysostôme Calès retired from public life and came back to Cessales, where he died on 21 April 1853, at the age of 84.

== Decorations and Honors ==
Legion of Honour:

- Chevalier de la Légion d'Honneur (Knight) on 25 Prairial, Year XII - 14 June 1804
- Officier de la Légion d'Honneur (Officer) on 11 July 1807

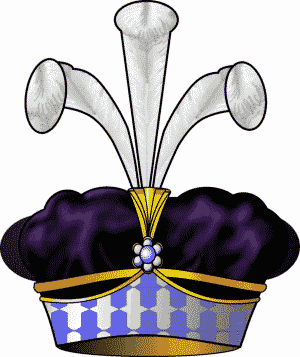
Baron of the Empire: on 15 August 1809.

== Genealogy ==
Jean-Chrysostôme Calès is:

- the young brother of Jean-Marie Calès (1757-1834), regicide and deputy at the National Convention (1792-1795) and at the Council of Five Hundred (1795-1798).
- the uncle of Godefroy Calès (1799-1868), deputy at the Constituent National Assembly (Second Republic) (1848-1849).
- the great-uncle of Jean Jules Godefroy Calès (1828-1889), deputy at the Chamber of Deputies (Third Republic) (1885-1889).

== Annexes ==
=== Bibliography ===
- A. Lievyns, Jean Maurice Verdot, Pierre Bégat, vol. 5, Bureau de l'administration, 1847, 2^{e} éd.
- Jean-Chrysostôme Calès, in Robert et Cougny, Dictionnaire des parlementaires français, 1889
- Biography of Jean-Chrysostome Calès on the website of the French National Assembly: http://www2.assemblee-nationale.fr/sycomore/fiche/(num_dept)/14325
- Ordre de la Légion d'honneur: Archives of Jean-Chrysostôme Calès on the Léonore database.
- « History of the 4th Infantry regiment of line (1796 - 1815) »(« Historique du 4e de ligne de 1796 à 1815 »)on the website Soldiers of the Grande Armée.
- « History of the 4th Infantry regiment of line (1791 - 1815) » (« Historique du 4e de ligne de 1796 à 1815 »)on the website Histoire du Consulat et du Premier Empire.
- « History of the 96th Infantry Regiment » (« Historique du 96e régiment d'infanterie »), Capitaine Jean-Baptiste Bouvier, 427 pages, editions A. Storck, Lyon (1892). In french. Read on line (digitized by Google) on the site of "Internet Archive": https://archive.org/details/bub_gb_6mmqiRwUXZwC
