= Battle of Barrosa order of battle =

Below is the order of battle for the Battle of Barrosa, also known in Spain as the Battle of Chiclana. The battle took place on 5 March 1811 during the Peninsular War between the Allied Army of Sir Thomas Graham and Manuel Lapeña against the French I Corps of the Armée du Sud (Army of the South) of Marshal Perrin.

== I Corps (Army of the South) ==
- I Corps, Armée du Sud
  - Commanding Officer; Maréchal d'Empire Claude Victor-Perrin, 1er Duc de Belluno
  - 1st Regiment of Dragoons (3 squadrons)
  - 2nd Regiment of Dragoons (3 squadrons)
  - 4 Foot Artillery Batteries
  - 1st Division; Général de Division François Amable Ruffin
    - Combined Grenadiers (2 battalions)
    - 24th Regiment of Line Infantry (1st and 2nd battalions)
    - 96th Regiment of Line Infantry (1st battalion)
    - 9th Regiment of Light Infantry (2nd battalion)
  - 2nd Division; Général de Division Jean François Leval
    - Combined Grenadiers (1 battalion)
    - 45th Regiment of Line Infantry (1st battalion)
    - 54th Regiment of Line Infantry (1st and 2nd battalions)
    - 8th Regiment of Line Infantry (1st and 2nd battalions)
  - 3rd Division; Général de Division Eugène-Casimir Villatte, Comte d'Oultremont
    - 94th Regiment of Line Infantry (1st and 2nd battalions)
    - 95th Regiment of Line Infantry (1st and 2nd battalions)
    - 27th Regiment of Light Infantry (1 battalion)

== Allied Army ==
- Commanding Officer; Lieutenant General Thomas Graham (British)
  - British Forces
    - 2nd Hussars (King's German Legion) (2 squadrons)
    - Browne's Flank Battalion — Formed from the flank companies (Grenadier and Light Infantry) of the following:
      - 1st Battalion, 9th (East Norfolk) Regiment of Foot
      - 1st Battalion, 28th (North Gloucestershire) Regiment of Foot
      - 2nd Battalion, 82nd Regiment of Foot (Prince of Wales's Volunteers)
    - Barnard's Flank Battalion
      - 2nd Battalion, 47th (Lancashire) Regiment of Foot (flank companies)
      - 20th Portuguese Infantry Regiment (4 coys)
      - 3rd Battalion, 95th Regiment of Foot (Riflemen) (4 coys)
    - 362 men of the Royal Artillery — commanded by Major Alexander Duncan (unknown units)
    - 96 men of the Corps of Royal Sappers and Miners and Staff
    - Dilkes's Brigade; Brigadier General William Thomas Dilkes
      - 2nd Battalion, 1st Regiment of Foot Guards
      - 2nd Battalion, Coldstream Regiment of Foot Guards (2 coys)
      - 2nd Battalion, 3rd Regiment of Foot Guards (3 coys)
      - 2nd Battalion, 95th Regiment of Foot (Riflemen) (2 coys)
    - Wheatley's Brigade; Brigadier General Henry Wheatley
      - 1st Battalion, 28th (North Gloucestershire) Regiment of Foot (8 coys)
      - 2nd Battalion, 67th (South Hampshire) Regiment of Foot
      - 2nd Battalion, 87th (The Prince of Wales's Own Irish) Regiment of Foot
  - Spanish Forces; Teniente General Manuel Lapeña Rodríguez y Ruiz de Sotillo
    - 14 guns from the Real Cuerpo de Artillería
    - four squadrons of cavalry
    - 1st Division; General de División Manuel de Lardizábal y Uribe
      - Campomayor Infantry Regiment (2 battalions)
      - Carmona Infantry Regiment (2 battalions)
      - Murcia Infantry Regiment (2 battalions)
      - Canaris Infantry Regiment (1 battalion)
    - 2nd Division; General de División Pedro de Alcántara Téllez-Girón, Príncipe de Anglona
      - African Infantry Regiment (2 battalions)
      - Siguenza Infantry Regiment (2 battalions)
      - Cantabrian Infantry Regiment (2 battalions)
      - Volunteers of Valencia (1 battalion)
