= I Corps (Grande Armée) =

Military unit of the Grande Armée

- Active: 1804–1807; 1812–1814; 1815
- Country: First French Empire
- Branch: French Imperial Army
- Size: Army Corps
- Part of: Grande Armée
- Engagements: War of the Third Coalition; Ulm campaign; Battle of Austerlitz; War of the Fourth Coalition; Battle of Jena–Auerstedt; Battle of Friedland; French invasion of Russia; Battle of Smolensk; Battle of Borodino; War of the Sixth Coalition; Battle of Dresden; Siege of Dresden; War of the Seventh Coalition; Battle of Waterloo

Commanders
- Notable commanders: Jean-Baptiste Bernadotte; Louis-Nicolas Davout; Jean-Baptiste Drouet, Comte d'Erlon; Claude Victor-Perrin, Duc de Belluno; Dominique Vandamme

The I Corps of the Grande Armée was a French military unit that existed during the Napoleonic Wars. Though disbanded in 1814, following the Treaty of Fontainebleau, it was reformed in April 1815 following the return of Napoléon during the Hundred Days. During the Hundred Days, the corps formed part of the quickly re-formed Army of the North.

== Campaigns ==
During the mobilisation by Napoléon in 1803, and the subsequent ordnance reforming the army, the new "Army of Hanover or Armée de Hanovre" was formed in French-occupied Hanover. This new army was the size of a corps, but under this reorganisation, this meant the corps was to be deemed an army (for psychological reasons). On 17 June 1805, Jean Baptiste Bernadotte was made Governor of Hanover, and on 29 August 1805 took control of the new I Corps, and remained in this role for another seven years.

=== War of the Third Coalition ===
When the War of the Third Coalition was declared, the Army of Hanover was separated from the new Army of Hanover (responsible for the defence of Hanover) and the I Corps. This new corps was formed as part of what later became the famed Grande Armée. On 29 August 1805, the I Corps arrived in Würzburg and was tasked with providing support to the Bavarian Army (now a French ally). During the famed Ulm campaign, the I Corps formed part of the far left flank, preventing the possible retreat of the Austrians under General Karl Mack von Leiberich. As Russian General Mikhail Kutuzov arrived in Eastern Austria/Bavaria, the reality of the situation caused a general retreat towards Moravia, and the I Corps was tasked with ensuring they wouldn't escape. This plan however, failed, and it was because of this move that the Battle of Austerlitz in fact went ahead, because of Kutuzov's successful retreat.

Below is the order of battle of the corps on the eve of the Grande Armée's crossing of the Rhine into (what is now) Germany.

Order of Battle on 26 October 1805

I Corps Headquarters; Maréchal d'Empire Jean Baptiste Bernadotte

- Corps Artillery; Colonel Humbert
  - 4th Company, 3rd Horse Artillery Regiment
  - 18th Company, 8th Artillery Regiment
  - 20th Company, 8th Artillery Regiment
  - 6 Artillery Train Companies (465 men)
  - 1st Company, 1st Auxiliary Pontooner Battalion (116 men)
  - 1st Detachment, 2nd Platoon, 8th Artisan Company (43 men)
- Cavalry Division; Général de Division François Étienne de Kellermann
  - 2nd Company, 3rd Horse Artillery Regiment
  - 3rd Company, 3rd Horse Artillery Regiment
  - Brigade; Général de Brigade Joseph-Denis Picard and Van Marizy
    - 2nd Hussar Regiment (2^{éme} Régiment de Hussards) — 3 squadrons with 431 men
    - 4th Hussar Regiment (4^{éme} Régiment de Hussards) — 3 squadrons with 444 men
    - 5th Hussar Regiment (5^{éme} Régiment de Hussards) — 3 squadrons with 355 men
    - 5th Regiment of Mounted Chasseurs (5^{éme} Régiment de Chasseurs à Cheval) — 3 squadrons with 436 men
- 1st Division; Général de Division Jean-Baptiste Drouet
  - 1st Company, 8th Artillery Regiment
  - 2nd Company, 8th Artillery Regiment
  - Brigade; Général de Brigade Bernard-Georges-François Frère and François Werlé
    - 94th Regiment of Line Infantry (94^{éme} Régiment d'Infanterie de Ligne) — 3 battalions with 2,097 men
    - 95th Regiment of Line Infantry (95^{éme} Régiment d'Infanterie de Ligne) — 3 battalions with 1,947 men
    - 27th Regiment of Light Infantry (27^{éme} Régiment d'Infanterie Légère) — 3 battalions with 2,161 men
- 2nd Division; Général de Division Olivier Macoux Rivaud de la Raffinière
  - 5th Company, 8th Artillery Regiment
  - 6th Company, 8th Artillery Regiment
  - Brigade; Général de Brigade Charles Dumoulin and Michel Marie Pacthod
    - 8th Regiment of Line Infantry (8^{éme} Régiment d'Infanterie de Ligne) — 3 battalions with 1,900 men
    - 45th Regiment of Line Infantry (45^{éme} Régiment d'Infanterie de Ligne) — 3 battalions with 1,822 men
    - 54th Regiment of Line Infantry (54^{éme} Régiment d'Infanterie de Ligne) — 3 battalions with 1,937 men

=== War of the Fourth Coalition ===
The corps took part in the battles of Schleiz, Halle, and Lübeck in 1806, and Mohrungen and Spanden in 1807. After Bernadotte was wounded at Spanden, General Claude Victor-Perrin led the I Corps at Friedland where his tactics earned him a marshal's baton.

==== Order of battle, 1808 ====
Order of battle in December 1808 just before it was disbanded
- 1st Division (Commander: Général de Division François Amable Ruffin)
  - 1st Brigade (Général de Brigade Étienne Nicolas Lefol)
    - 24^{e} Régiment d'Infanterie de Ligne (RI)
    - 9^{e} Régiment d'Infanterie Légère
  - 2nd Bde (Général de Brigade Pierre Barrois)
    - 96^{e} RI
  - Divisional Artillery
    - 6^{éme} Compagnie du 1^{er} Régiment d'Artillerie à Pied (RAP)
    - 7^{éme} C^{ie} / 1^{er} RAP
    - (detachment) 8^{éme} Artisan C^{ie} d'Artillerie
- 2nd Division (Général de Division Pierre Belon Lapisse)
  - 1st Bde (Général de Brigade Jean Grégoire de Laplane)
    - 16^{e} RI
    - 45^{e} RI
  - 2nd Bde (Général de Brigade Augustin Darricau)
    - 8^{e} RI
    - 54^{e} RI
  - Divisional Artillery
    - 7^{éme} C^{ie} / 1^{er} RAP
    - 2^{éme} C^{ie} / 8^{e} RAP
    - (detachment) 8^{éme} Artisan Compagnie d'Artillerie
- 3rd Division (Général de Division Eugène-Casimir Villatte)
  - 1st Bde (Général de Brigade Michel-Marie Pacthod)
    - 63^{e} RI
    - 27^{e} Régiment d'Infanterie Légère
  - 2nd Bde (Général de Brigade Jacques-Pierre Puthod)
    - 94^{e} RI
    - 95^{e} RI
  - Divisional Artillery
    - 7^{éme} C^{ie} / 1^{er} RAP
    - 6^{éme} C^{ie} / 8^{e} RAP
    - (detachment) 8^{éme} Artisan C^{ie} d'Artillerie
- Cavalry Division
  - 1st Bde (Général de Brigade Marc Antoine de Beaumont)
    - 2^{e} Régiment de Hussards
    - 26^{éme} Régiment de Chasseurs à Cheval
  - Divisional Artillery
    - 2^{éme} C^{ie} / 3^{e} RAP
    - 3^{éme} C^{ie} / 3^{e} RAP
    - 8^{éme} Artisan C^{ie} d'Artillerie
- Corps Artillery & Engineers
  - 11^{éme} C^{ie} / 1^{er} RAP
  - 1^{er} C^{ie} / 8^{éme} RAP
  - 6^{éme} C^{ie} / 1^{er} Ponton Bataillon

=== Russian campaign ===
The corps was reorganised into a strength of five infantry divisions for the invasion of Russia in 1812 and Marshal Louis-Nicolas Davout was appointed to lead it. At the crossing of the Niemen River in 1812, the size of I Corps was around 79,000 men, but six weeks later, about 60,000 men remained. By the end of the Russian campaign, only 2,235 men remained.

Under Davout, the I Army Corps left Minsk on 12 July 1812 to cut off Pyotr Bagration from Barclay de Tolly. It fought at Battle of Smolensk (1812), Borodino, Vyazma, and Krasnoi before dissolving as an effective unit during the retreat from Moscow.

=== War of the Sixth Coalition ===
In 1813, the I Corps was reconstituted and placed under the command of General Dominique Vandamme. The corps was destroyed at Kulm, with the remnants surrendering together with XIV Corps following the siege of Dresden in November 1813.

==== Order of battle, 1813 ====
Order of battle in September 1813 just before the War of the Sixth Coalition
- Commander-in-Chief, Général de Division Georges Mouton, Comte de Lobau
- Chief of Staff, Général de Brigade Joseph Marie, Count Dessaix
- Commander of Artillery, Général de Brigade Basile de Pouilly
- 20th Light Cavalry Brigade (Commander: Général de Brigade Weissenwolf)
  - 13^{e} Régiment de Hussards Polognaise (Polish Hussars)
  - 16^{e} Régiment de Chevaulégers-lanciers Polognaise (Polish Lancers)
- 21st Light Cavalry Bde (Général de Brigade Martin Charles Gobrecht)
  - 1^{er} Escadron / 9^{e} Régiment de Chevaulégers-lanciers (lancers)
- 1st Division (Général de Division Louis Victorin Cassagne)
  - 1st Brigade
    - I, II / 12^{e} Régiment d'Infanterie de Ligne (RI)
    - I, II / 7^{e} Régiment d'Infanterie Légère (RL)
  - 2nd Bde
    - I, II / 17^{e} RI
    - III / 36^{e} RI
  - Divisional Artillery
    - 8^{e} Compagnie / 2^{e} Régiment d'Artillerie à Pied (RAP)
    - 23^{e} C^{ie} / 3^{e} RAP
    - (detachment) 1^{er} C^{ie} / Principle Train d'Artillerie
    - (detachment) 14^{e} Principle Train d'Artillerie
    - (detachment) 1^{er} C^{ie} / Principle Train d'Artillerie
- 2nd Division (Général de Division Jean-Baptiste Dumonceau)
  - 1st Bde
    - I, II / 25^{e} RI
    - I, II / 13^{e} RL
  - 2nd Bde
    - I, II, III / 57^{e} RI
    - III / 51^{e} RI
  - Divisional Artillery
    - 5^{e} C^{ie} / 4^{e} RAP
    - (detachment) 1^{er} C^{ie} / 1^{er} Bataillon du Train
    - (detachment) 5^{e} C^{ie} / 8^{e} Bataillon du Train
- 23rd Division, commanded by Général de Division Jean-Baptiste Teste
  - 1st Brigade
    - I, II, III, IV / 21^{e} RI
    - I, II / 33^{e} RI
  - 2nd Brigade
    - I, II / 85^{e} RI
    - IV / 55^{e} RI
  - Divisional Artillery
    - 21^{e} C^{ie} / 4^{e} RAP
    - (detachment) 1^{er} C^{ie} / 1^{er} Bataillon du Train d'Artillerie
- Corps Artillery
  - 2^{e} C^{ie} / 6^{e} RAP
  - 15^{e} C^{ie} / 9^{e} RAP
  - Horse Artillery
    - 4^{e} C^{ie} / 1^{er} Régiment d'Artillerie à Cheval (RAC)
    - 2^{e} C^{ie} / 4^{e} RAC
    - 5^{e} C^{ie} / 6^{e} RAC
  - Supply and Engineers
    - (detachments) 3^{e} & 5^{e} Compagnies / 9^{e} Principle Bataillon du Train
    - (detachment) 6^{e} Principle Bataillon du Train
    - 5^{e} C^{ie} / 3^{e} Sapeur Bataillon
    - 7^{e} C^{ie} / 3^{e} Sapeur Bataillon
    - 1^{er}, 2^{e}, and 3^{e} Compagnies / 10^{e} Bataillon du Equipage

==== Order of battle, 1814 ====
Order of battle in February 1814 just before the invasion of France
- Commanding Officer, Général de Division Nicolas Joseph Maison, 1er Marquis Maison
- Cavalry Division (Commander: Général de Division Bertrand-Pierre Castex)
  - 2^{e} Chasseurs à Cheval de la Garde Imperiale (Young Guard)
  - 2^{e} Régiment de Chevaulégers-lanciers de la Garde Imperiale (Dutch, Old Guard)
- Infantry Division (Général de Division Pierre Barrois)
  - I, II / 12^{e} Régiment de Voltigeurs (Young Guard)
  - I, II / 2^{e} Régiment de Tirailleurs (Young Guard)
  - I, II / 3^{e} Régiment de Tirailleurs (Young Guard)
  - I, II / 4^{e} Régiment de Tirailleurs (Young Guard)
  - II / 72^{e} Régiment d'Infanterie de Ligne
- Corps Artillery & Train
  - 3^{e} Compagnie d'Artillerie de la Vielle Garde Imperiale (Old Guard)
  - 3^{e} C^{ie} d'Artillerie de la Jeune Garde Imperiale (Young Guard)
  - 13^{e} C^{ie} d'Artillerie de la Jeune Garde Imperiale (Young Guard)
  - 7^{e}, 8^{e}, and 10^{e} Compagnies / 1^{er} Bataillon du Train
  - 2^{e}, 8^{e} Compagnies / 2^{e} Bataillon du Train
  - Artisan Pioneers (7 men)

=== War of the Seventh Coalition ===
The corps was rebuilt in 1815 during the Hundred Days, and was assigned to General Jean-Baptiste Drouet, under whom it fought at the Battle of Waterloo.

==== Order of battle, 1815 ====
Order of battle in June 1815
- I Corps Headquarters commanded by Général de Division Jean-Baptiste Drouet
  - I Corps Compagnie du Train des Équipages (1st Corps Equipment Train Company)
  - I Corps Artillery
    - 11ème Compagnie du 6ème Régiment d'Artillerie à Pied (11th Company, 6th Foot Artillery Regiment) (3 Officer, 84 Troops, Six 12 Pounder field cannons and Two 5.5-inch howitzers)
    - 6ème Compagnie du 1er Escadron du Train dArtillerie (6th Company, 1st Artillery Train Squadron) (1 Officer, 118 Troops)
  - I Corps Engineers
    - 2ème Bataillon du 1er Régiment du Génie (2nd Battalion, 1st Engineer Regiment) (21 Officers, 330 Troops) — Each company attached to their respective divisions, 5th Company in reserve
- 1st Cavalry Division, commanded by Général de Division Charles Claude Jacquinot, Baron
  - 2ème Compagnie du 1er Régiment d'Artillerie à Cheval (2nd Company, 1st Horse Artillery Regiment) — 4 Field Cannons and 2 5.5 Howitzers, 3 Officers and 70 Troops
  - 1ére Ambulance Divisionnaire (1st Divisional Ambulance)
  - 1st Brigade, commanded by Général de Brigade Adrien François Bruno, Baron
    - 7ème Régiment de Hussards (7th Hussars) — 28 Officers and 411 Troops in 3 Squadrons, commanded by Colonel Baron Jean-Baptiste Antoine Marcellin de Marbot
    - 3ème Régiment de Chasseurs à Cheval (3rd Mounted Chasseurs Regiment) — 29 Officers and 3367 Troops in 3 Squadrons, commanded by Colonel Anatole Charles Alexis, Marquis de Lawoestine
  - 2nd Brigade, commanded by Général de Brigade Baron Martin Charles Gobrecht
    - 3ème Régiment de Chevaux-Légers Lanciers (3rd Lancers Regiment) — 27 Officers and 379 Troops in 3 Squadrons, commanded by Colonel Charles-François Martigue
    - 4ème Régiment de Chevaux-Légers Lanciers (4th Lancers Regiment) — 22 Officers and 274 Troops in 2 Squadrons, commanded by Colonel Louis Bro
- 1st Infantry Division, commanded by Général de Division Baron Joachim Jérôme Quiot du Passage
  - 1ére Infanterie Ambulance Divisionnaire (1st Infantry Divisional Ambulance)
  - 1st Brigade, commanded by Colonel Claude Charlet
    - 54ème Régiment d'Infanterie de Ligne (54th Regiment of Line Infantry), 41 Officers and 921 Troops in 2 battalions, commanded by Colonel Claude Charlet
    - 55ème Régiment d'Infanterie de Ligne (55th Regiment of Line Infantry), 45 Officers and 1103 Troops in 2 battalions, commanded by Colonel Jean-Pierre Monneret
  - 2nd Brigade, commanded by Général de Brigade Baron Charles François Bourgeois
    - 28ème Régiment d'Infanterie de Ligne (28th Regiment of Line Infantry), 42 Officers and 856 Troops in 2 battalions, commanded by Chef de Bataillon (Major) Senac
    - 105ème Régiment d'Infanterie de Ligne (105th Regiment of Line Infantry), 42 Officers and 941 Troops in 2 Battalions, commanded by Colonel Jean Genty
  - 1st Infantry Division Artillery
    - 20ème Compagnie du 6ème Régiment d'Artillerie à Pied (20th Company, 6th Foot Artillery Regiment), 4 Officers and 81 Troops, Six 6-Pounder field cannons and Two 5.5-Pounder howitzers
    - 5ème Compagnie du 1er Escadron du Train d'Artillerie (5th Company, 1st Artillery Train), 3 Officers and 103 Troops
- 2nd Infantry Division, commanded by Général de Division Baron François-Xavier Donzelot
  - 2éme Infanterie Ambulance Divisionnaire (2nd Infantry Divisional Ambulance)
  - 1st Brigade, commanded by Général de Brigade Baron Nicolas Schmitz
    - 13ème Régiment d'Infanterie Légère (13th Light Infantry Regiment), 61 Officers and 1814 Troops in 3 Battalions, commanded by Colonel Pierre Gougeon
    - 17ème Régiment d'Infanterie de Ligne (17th Regiment of Line Infantry), 42 Officers and 1015 Troops in 2 Battalions, commanded by Colonel Chevalier Nicolas-Noël de Gueurel
  - 2nd Brigade, commanded by Général de Brigade Baron Pierre Aulard
    - 19ème Régiment d'Infanterie de Ligne (19th Regiment of Line Infantry), 43 Officers and 989 Troops in 2 Battalions, commanded by Colonel Baron Jean-Aimable Trupel
    - 51ème Régiment d'Infanterie de Ligne (51st Regiment of Line Infantry), 42 Officers and 1126 Troops in 2 Battalions, commanded by Colonel Baron Jean-Antoine Rignon
  - 2nd Infantry Division Artillery
    - 11ème Compagnie du 6ème Régiment d'Artillerie à Pied (11th Company, 6th Foot Artillery Regiment), 3 Officers and 84 Troops, Six 12-Pounder field cannons and Two 5.5-Pounder howitzers
    - 6ème Compagnie du 1er Escadron du Train dArtillerie (6th Company, 1st Artillery Train Squadron), 1 Officer and 118 Troops
- 3rd Infantry Division, commanded by Général de Division Baron Pierre-Louis Binet de Marcognet
  - 3éme Infanterie Ambulance Divisionnaire (3rd Infantry Divisional Ambulance)
  - 1st Brigade, commanded by Général de Brigade Chevalier Antoine Noguès
    - 21ème Régiment d'Infanterie de Ligne (21st Regiment of Line Infantry), 41 officers and 996 Troops in 2 Battalions, commanded by Colonel Baron Jean-Nicolas Carré
    - 46ème Régiment d'Infanterie de Ligne (46th Regiment of Line Infantry), 43 Officers and 845 Troops in 2 Battalions, commanded by Colonel Baron Louis-André Dupré
  - 2nd Brigade, commanded by Général de Brigade Baron Jean-George Grenier
    - 25ème Régiment d'Infanterie de Ligne (25th Regiment of Line Infantry), 40 Officers and 934 Troops in 2 Battalions, commanded by Colonel Jean-Joseph Degrométy
    - 45ème Régiment d'Infanterie de Ligne (45th Regiment of Line Infantry), 43 Officers and 960 Troops in 2 Battalions, commanded by Colonel Louis Guillaume-Joseph Chapuzet
  - 3rd Infantry Division Artillery
    - 19ème Compagnie du 6ème Régiment d'Artillerie à Pied (19th Company, 6th Foot Artillery Regiment), 4 Officers and 81 Troops, equipped with Six 6-pounder field cannons and Two 5.5-pounder howitzers
    - 2ème Compagnie du 1er Escadron du Train d'Artillerie (2nd Company, 1st Artillery Train Squadron), 2 Officers and 92 Troops
- 4th Infantry Division, commanded by Général de Division Comte Pierre Durutte
  - 4éme Infanterie Ambulance Divisionnaire (4th Infantry Divisional Ambulance)
  - 1st Brigade, commanded by Général de Brigade Chevalier Claude Jean-Gaudens Pégot
    - 8ème Régiment d'Infanterie de Ligne (8th Regiment of Line Infantry), 40 Officers and 943 Troops in 2 Battalions, commanded by Colonel Louis-Gabriel Hypolyte Ruelle
    - 29ème Régiment d'Infanterie de Ligne (29th Regiment of Line Infantry), 40 Officers and 1106 Troops in 2 Battalions, commanded by Colonel Étienne-Nicolas Rousselot
  - 2nd Brigade, commanded by Général de Brigade Jean-Louis Brue du Garoutier
    - 85ème Régiment d'Infanterie de Ligne (85th Regiment of Line Infantry), 40 Officers and 591 Troops in 2 Battalions, commanded by Colonel André Pierre Masson
    - 95ème Régiment d'Infanterie de Ligne (95th Regiment of Line Infantry), 40 Officers and 1060 Troops in 2 Battalions, commanded by Colonel Jean-Baptiste Garnier
  - 4th Infantry Division Artillery
    - 9ème Compagnie du 6ème Régiment d'Artillerie à Pied (9th Company, 6th Foot Artillery Regiment), 3 Officers and 81 Troops, equipped with Six 6-pounder field cannons and Two 5.5-pounder howitzers
    - 3ème Compagnie du 1er Escadron du Train d'Artillerie (3rd Company, 1st Artillery Train Squadron), 1 Officer and 92 Troops
