= The Distribution of the Eagle Standards =

Painting by Jacques-Louis David

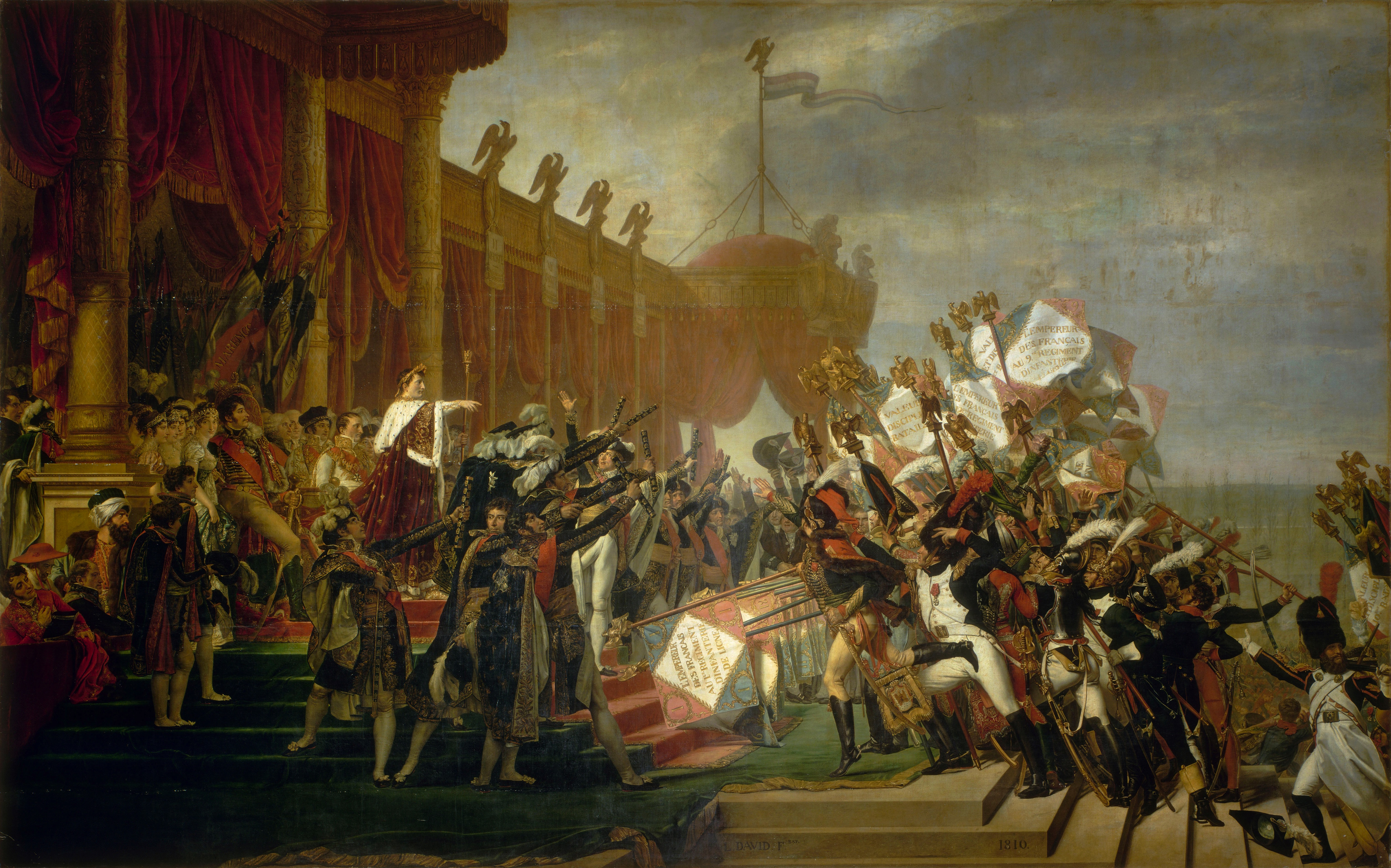
- Artist: Jacques-Louis David
- Year: 1810
- Medium: Oil on canvas
- Dimensions: 610 cm × 610 cm (240 in × 240 in)
- Location: Versailles, France

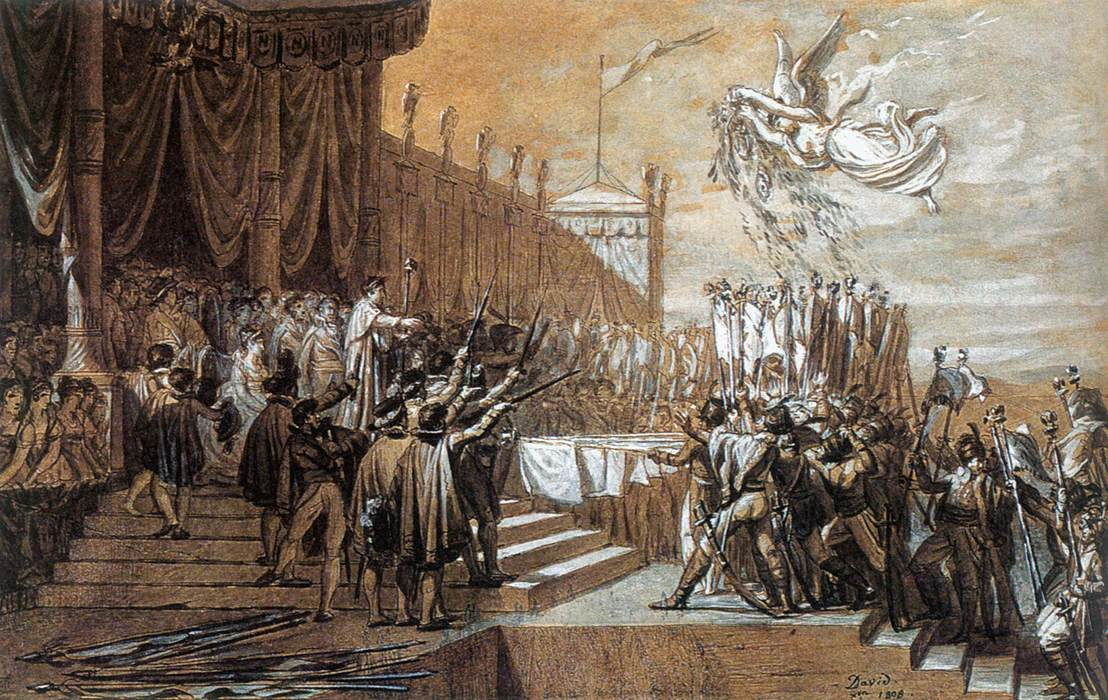
A study by David for the painting

The Distribution of the Eagle Standards is an 1810 oil painting by Jacques-Louis David depicting a military ceremony in 1804 that was arranged by Napoleon after his assumption of power as Emperor of the French. In the ceremony, Napoleon sought to revive the military ethos of the Roman Empire.

The full French language title of the work is Serment de l'armée fait à l'empereur après la distribution des aigles au champ de Mars, 5 décembre 1804, which translates literally as "Oath of the army made to the emperor after the distribution of the eagles at the field of Mars, 5 December 1804".

It was exhibited at the Salon of 1810 at the Louvre. The painting is in the collection of the Château de Versailles. It is on display there in the Salle du Sacre, which also contains David's second version of his Sacre de l'empereur Napoléon.

== Background ==
The depicted event took place on 5 December 1804, three days after Napoleon's coronation ceremony. He distributed "eagles" that were based on the Roman aquila of the legions of Rome. The standards represented the regiments raised by the various departments of France, and they were intended to institute feelings of pride and loyalty among the troops, who would be the backbone of Napoleon's new regime. Napoleon gave an emotional speech in which he insisted that troops should defend the standards with their lives.

In early sketches of the painting, David included a winged figure of Nike, the goddess of victory, floating over the troops, but Napoleon objected to such an unrealistic feature. He also insisted that his wife Josephine be removed from the composition. He was preparing to divorce her, since she had failed to produce his heir.

The final painting depicted the moment when Napoleon blessed the standards being held out towards him. Napoleon has his arm raised in imitation of ancient "adlocutio" scenes, which depict Classical heroes addressing troops. David's composition was heavily influenced by the friezes on Trajan's Column.

== See also ==
- List of paintings by Jacques-Louis David
