= French Imperial Eagle =

Battle standard of the French Imperial Army

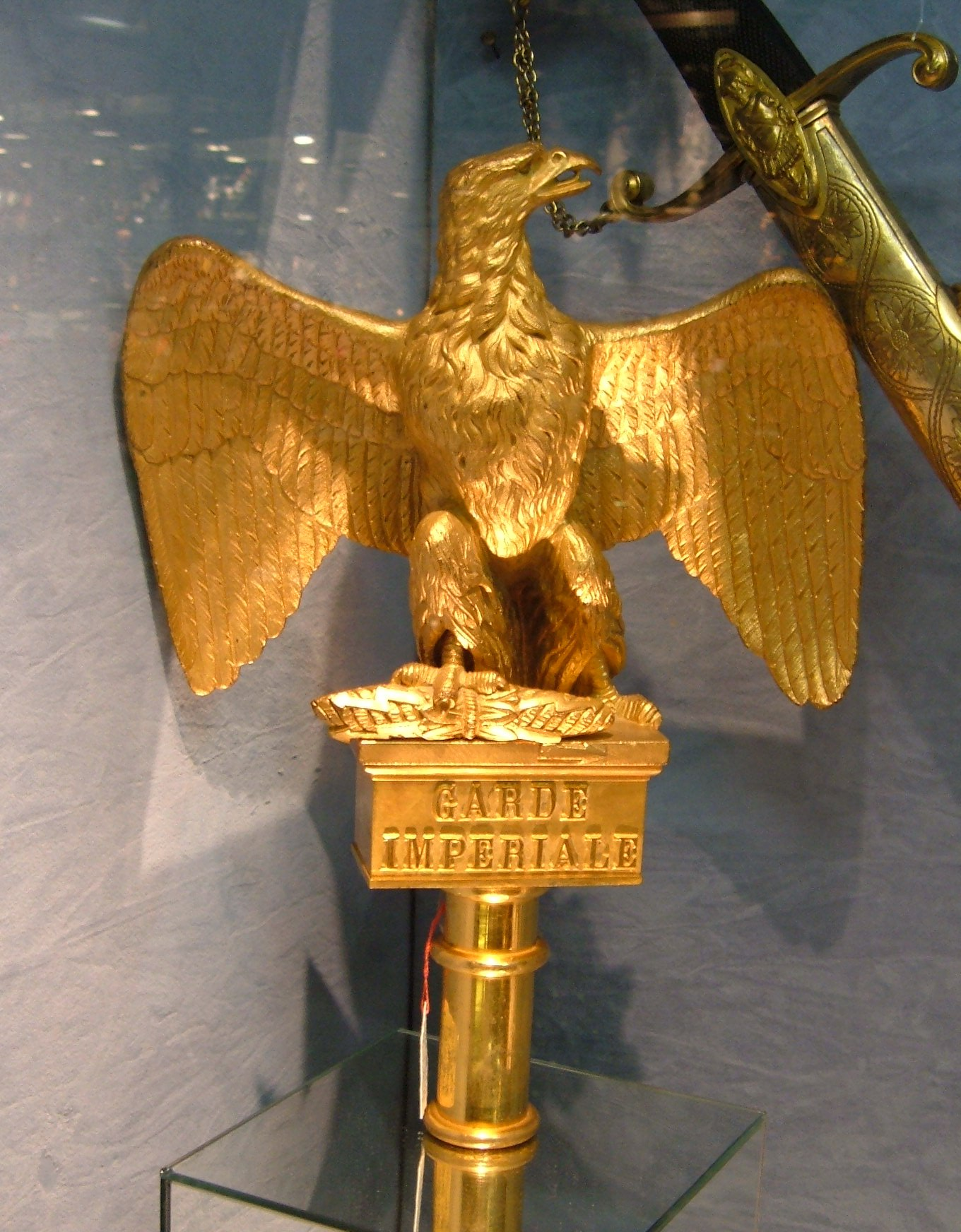
An Imperial Guard eagle on display at Louvre des Antiquaires

The French Imperial Eagle (French: Aigle de drapeau, lit. 'flag eagle') was a figure carried into battle as a standard by the Grande Armée of Napoleon I during the Napoleonic Wars. Although they were presented with regimental colours, Napoleon's regiments tended to carry at their head the Imperial Eagle.

== History ==
1810 painting of Napoleon distributing the eagles on 5 December 1804

On 5 December 1804, three days after his coronation, Napoleon I distributed aigles based on the eagle standards of the Roman legions. The standards represented the regiments raised by the various departments of France, and were intended to institute feelings of pride and loyalty among the troops who would be the backbone of Napoleon's new Imperial regime. Napoleon gave an emotional speech in which he insisted that troops should defend the standards with their lives. This event was depicted in The Distribution of the Eagle Standards, an 1810 painting by Jacques-Louis David.

The original design was sculpted by Antoine-Denis Chaudet and then copies were cast in the workshop of Pierre-Philippe Thomire, with the first eagles presented on 5 December 1804. It was a bronze sculpture of an eagle on a plinth, with one claw resting on "Jupiter's spindle". weighing 1.85 kg (4 lb), mounted on top of the blue regimental flagpole. They were made from six separately cast pieces designed along Roman lines and, when assembled, measured 310 mm (12 in) in height and 255 mm (10 in) in width. On the base would be the regiment's number or, in the case of the Imperial Guard, Garde Impériale. The eagle bore the same significance to French Imperial regiments as the colours did to British regiments - to lose the eagle would bring shame to the regiment, who had pledged to defend it to the death. Upon Napoleon's fall, the restored monarchy of King Louis XVIII ordered all eagles to be destroyed; only a very small number were preserved. When the former emperor returned to power in 1815 (known as the Hundred Days), he immediately had more eagles produced, although the quality did not match the originals. The workmanship was of a lesser quality and the main distinguishing changes had the new models with closed beaks and they were set in a more crouched posture.

Origins, variants, and surviving instance
The Roman Imperial Eagle inspired Napoleon's French Imperial Eagle.

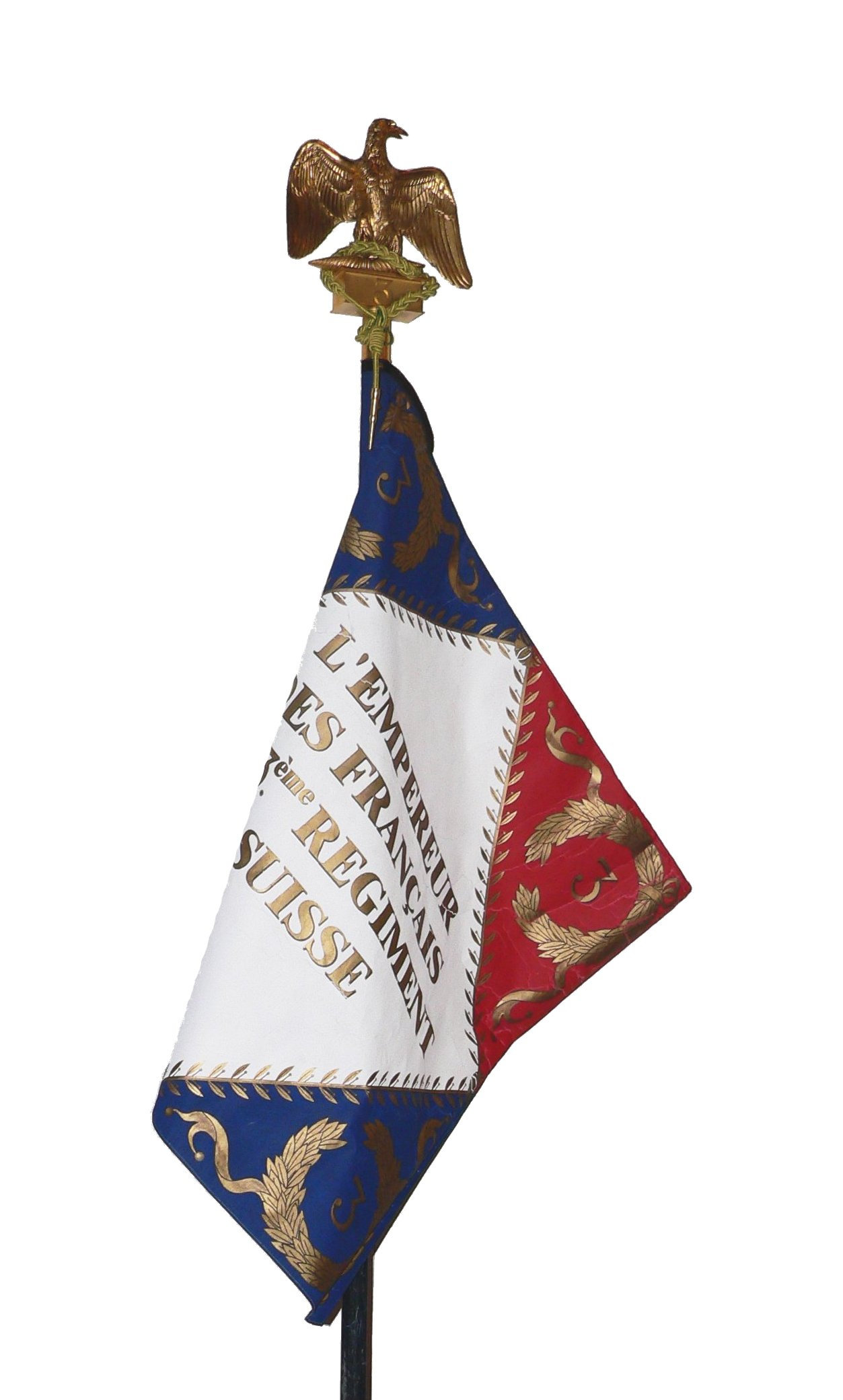
French Imperial Eagle of a regiment of the Grande Armée

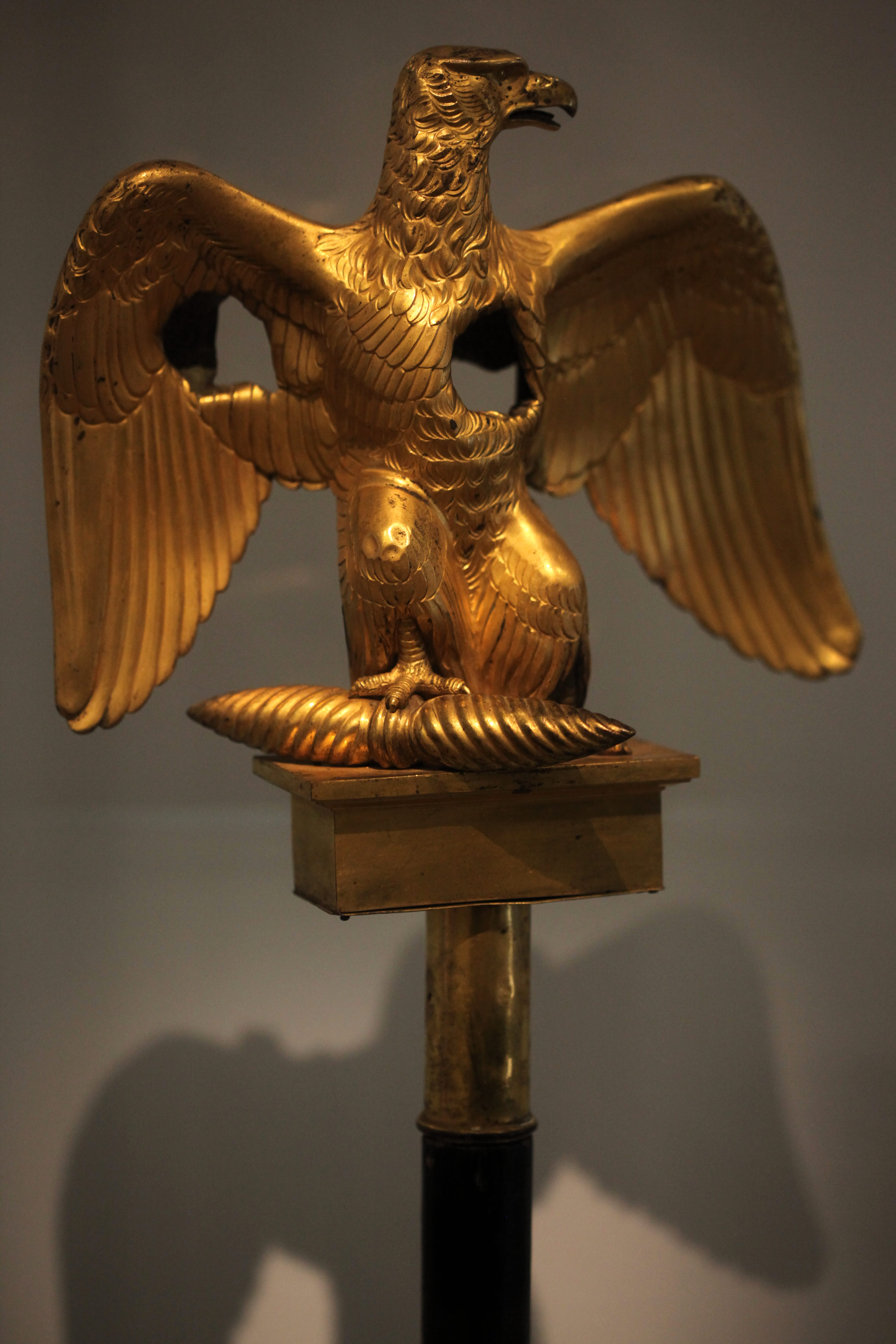
So-called "wounded Eagle" (fr. aigle blessée), Eagle damaged by enemy fire, on display at the Musée de l'Armée in Paris

The current royal house of Sweden retains an imperial eagle on its coat of arms, as its founder, Jean-Baptiste Bernadotte, was a Marshal of the Empire and Prince of Pontecorvo.

=== Captured eagles ===
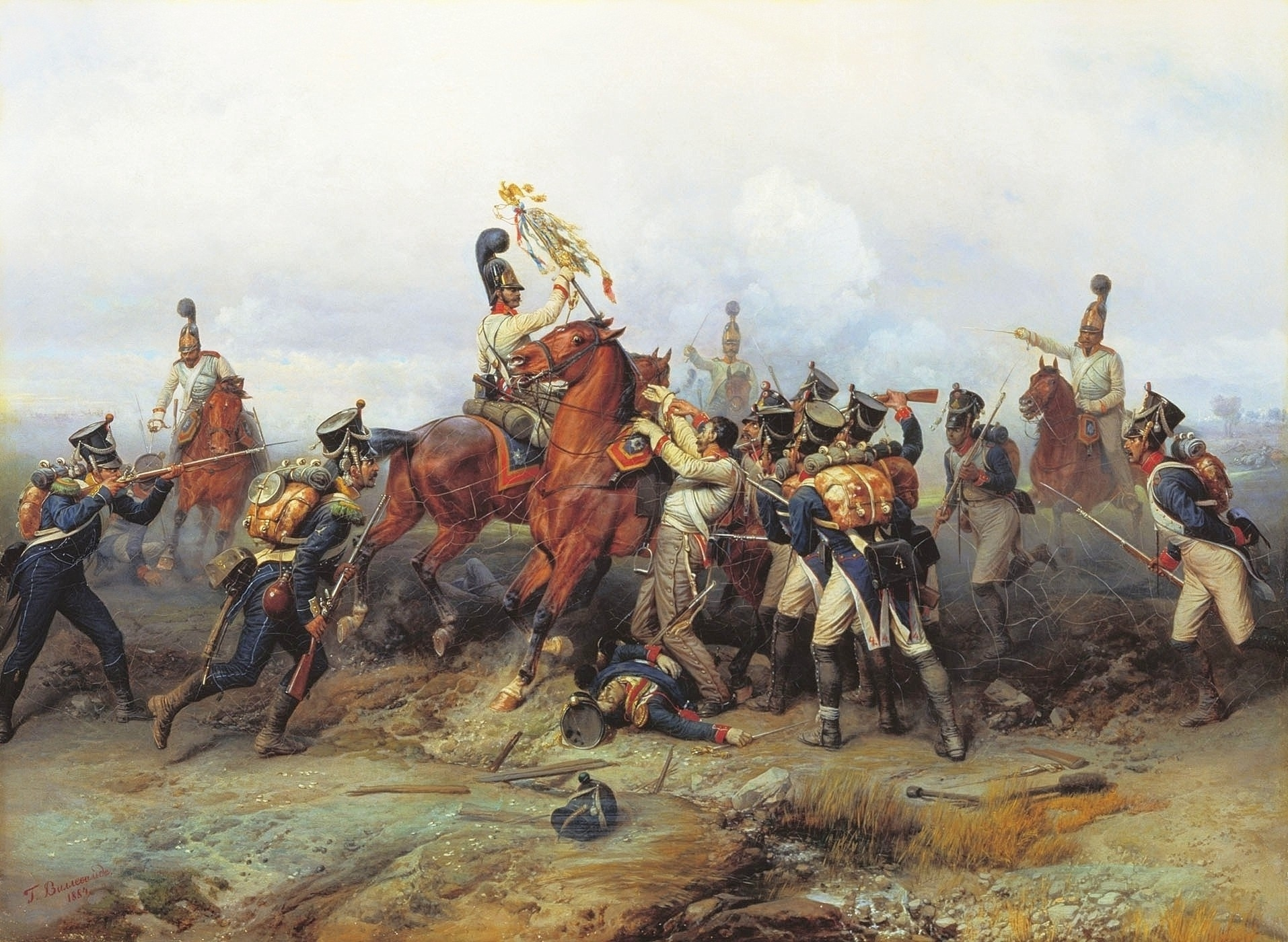
The Russian Imperial Guard's Life Guard Horse Regiment capturing the 4th Line Infantry Regiment's eagle at Austerlitz

The first capture of an eagle most likely occurred during the 1805 Battle of Austerlitz, when Russian Imperial Guard cavalry under Grand Duke Konstantin overran the French 4th Line Infantry Regiment. Although France won the battle, the Russians retreated in good order and the eagle was not recovered, much to Napoleon's regret.

In 1807, the 55th Line Infantry Regiment was overrun by Prussian cavalry and Russian infantry at the Battle of Heilsberg. The regimental eagle was lost and several officers, including a colonel, were killed. Russian sources claimed the eagle was captured by Anton Antonov of the Pernau Musketeers. Prussian historians disputed this, claiming that the Prittwitz Hussars captured the eagle. At the Battle of Eylau, the 18th Line Infantry Regiment had its eagle captured by the Russian St. Petersburg Dragoons. At the 1812 Battle of Krasnoi, the 18th Line Infantry Regiment again lost its eagle when it was "virtually destroyed" by the Russian Life Guard Uhlans.

In 1808, at the Battle of Bailén an entire French corps under General Pierre Dupont de l'Étang surrendered after being defeated by a Spanish army led by Francisco Javier Castaños and Theodor von Reding; this was the first surrender of a field army of the French Imperial Army. As part of the terms of capitulation, the French gave up their flags and banners, including three eagles. These eagles were kept in Seville Cathedral until they were recovered by the French in 1810 and sent back to Paris.

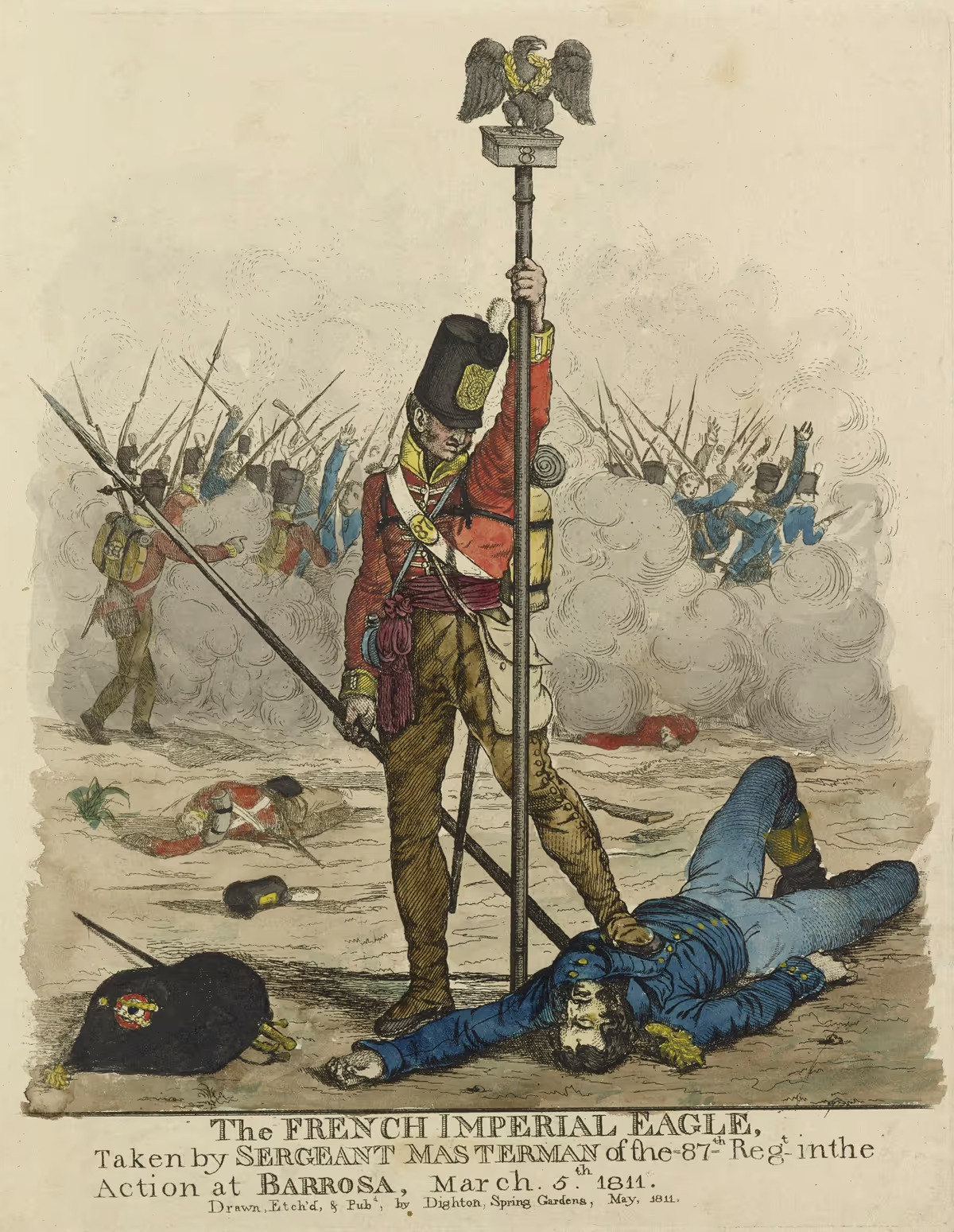
Patrick Masterson with the captured eagle of the 8th Line Infantry Regiment at Barrosa

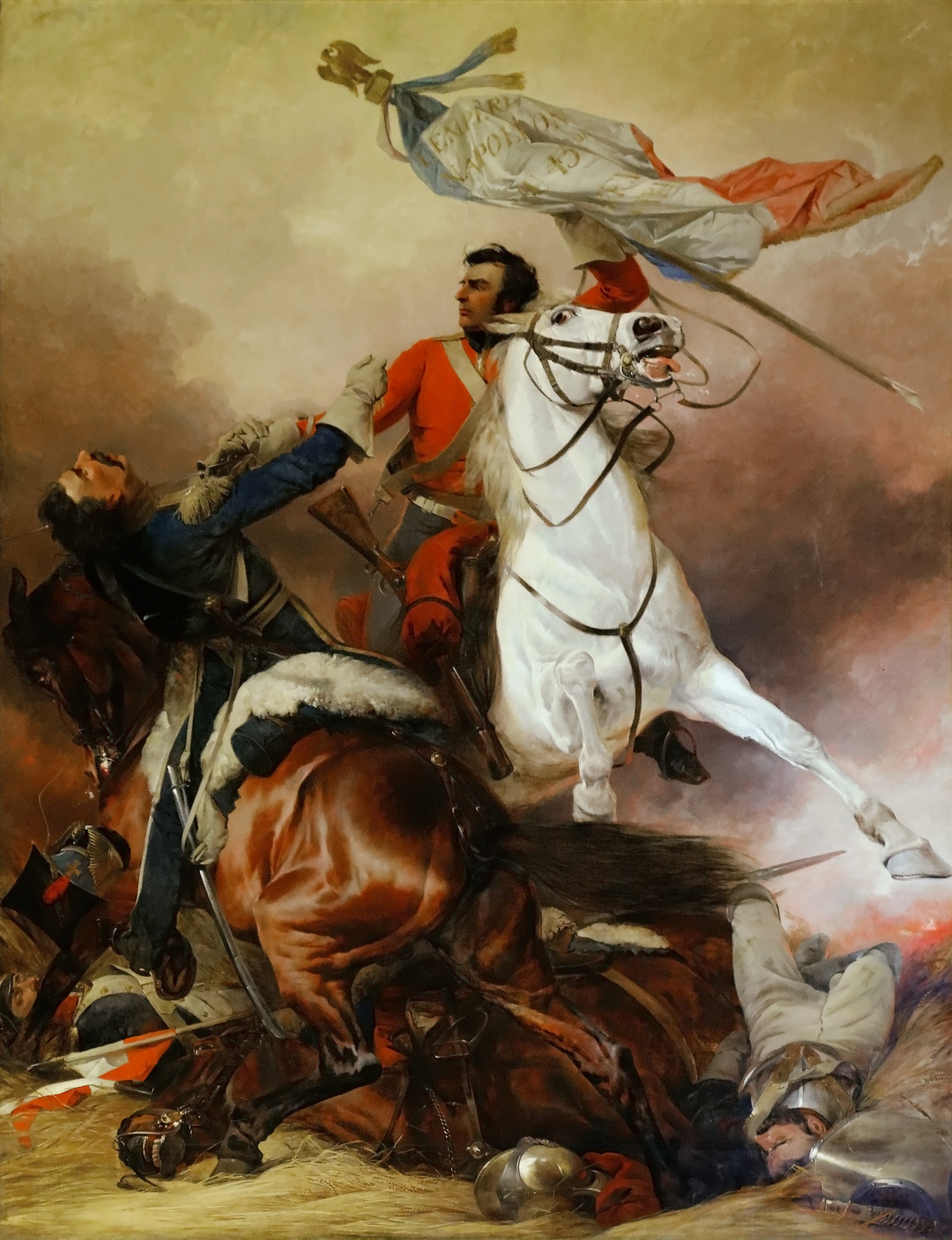
Charles Ewart capturing the 45th Line Infantry Regiment's eagle at Waterloo

The first eagles to be captured by British troops were taken during the 1809 invasion of Martinique, including the eagle of the 82nd Line Infantry Regiment. The 87th Regiment of Foot captured an eagle at the Battle of Barrosa on 5 March 1811. At the battle, Ensign Edward Keogh attempted to take the eagle of the 8th Line Infantry Regiment. Keogh only managed to get a hand on the eagle's shaft when he was fatally shot and bayoneted. Sergeant Patrick Masterson of the 87th subsequently killed several French soldiers before wrenching the eagle from the dying hands of its bearer, Lieutenant Gazan. The captured eagle was taken back to England and displayed at the Royal Hospital Chelsea. Several years later, the eagle was stolen from the hospital after being broken from its staff. Although rumours abounded that it had been stolen by a Frenchman, the eagle was more likely melted down and sold. The original staff is still held in the Royal Irish Fusiliers Museum in Armagh, Northern Ireland.

The Anglo-Portuguese Army captured two eagles at the Battle of Salamanca in July 1812. In spite of claims that Ensign John Pratt of the 2/30th Regiment of Foot's light company captured the eagle of the 22nd Line Infantry Regiment (displayed today in the Lancashire Infantry Museum in Preston, Lancashire), it was actually Portuguese troops of the 12th Caçadores Battalion which captured the eagle. At Salamanca, Lieutenant William Pearce of the 2/44th Regiment of Foot took the eagle of the 62nd Line Infantry Regiment (displayed today in the Chelmsford Museum in Essex). Following the Allied recapture of Madrid on 14 August 1812, two eagles were found belonging to the 13th Dragoon Regiment and the 51st Line Infantry Regiment.

Two of the newer eagles were captured at the Battle of Waterloo in 1815. The French I Corps under Jean-Baptiste Drouet, Comte d'Erlon was charged by British heavy cavalry commanded by Lord Uxbridge; Captain Alexander Kennedy Clark of the 1st The Royal Dragoons captured the eagle of the 105th Line Infantry Regiment; (now held at the National Army Museum, Chelsea) and Sergeant Charles Ewart of the Royal Scots Greys captured the eagle of the 45th Line Infantry Regiment (now held at the Royal Scots Dragoon Guards Museum in Edinburgh Castle).

Before the Duke of Wellington died in 1852, he had asked that all his battle trophies be carried at his funeral. As the eagle captured by Masterson was not available, it was decided to make a replica. The mould was made by Garrard & Co and was designed from a sketch of the original drawn by an officer of the 87th Foot following the Battle of Barrosa.

The capture of an eagle was celebrated through the addition of the eagle as a symbol or accoutrement to a regiment's colour or uniform. The Blues and Royals (descended from the 1st Royal Dragoons) and the Royal Anglian Regiment (descended from the 44th Foot) both wear the eagle as an arm badge, while the cap badge of the Royal Scots Dragoon Guards (Carabiniers and Greys) (descended from the Royal Scots Greys) is an eagle. The Royal Irish Regiment wear the eagle of the 8th on the back pouch of the officers' black cross belt.

A French Imperial Eagle, which had belonged to the 1st Regiment of Foot Grenadiers of the Imperial Guard, was among the items stolen in 1990 from the Isabella Stewart Gardner Museum in Boston, Massachusetts. The 1st Régiment de Grenadiers had formed two squares at the Battle of Waterloo, one of which was formed around Napoleon himself. In May 2015, the Isabella Stewart Gardner Museum offered a reward of $100,000 for the safe return of the Eagle which remains missing.

== See also ==
- Historical colours, standards and guidons

== Sources ==
- Carter, Thomas (1864). Historical Record of the Forty-Fourth, or the East Essex Regiment of Foot. London: W. O. Mitchell.
- Fraser, Edward (1913). The Soldiers who Wellington Led. London: Methuen. pp. 129–148.
- Oman, (Sir) Charles (1911). A History of the Peninsular War. Vol. 4. London: Clarendon Press.
