= 17th Infantry Regiment (France) =

17e régiment d’infanterie
- Active: 1597–1921
- Country: France
- Branch: Armée de Terre
- Type: Infantry
- Mottos: Invicta Legio; Auvergne toujours
- Engagements: Valmy 1792; Austerlitz 1805; Auerstadt 1806; Borodino 1812; Algeria 1830; Artois 1915; Verdun 1916; Somme-Py 1918

The 17e régiment d'infanterie (English:17th Infantry Regiment) was a unit of the French army and among its oldest.

== The French Revolutionary Wars ==
- 1791: during the French Revolution, all regiments take on a number according to the age of their formation. The régiment d’Auvergne becomes the 17e régiment d’infanterie
- 1793: at the beginning of the French Revolution, the regiment becomes 17e demi-brigade de bataille, which were composed of the following units:
  - 1st battalion of the 9e régiment d'infanterie de ligne;
  - 2nd battalion of volunteers of the department of India;
  - 3rd battalion of volunteers of Seine-Inférieure;
- 1796: during the second merger, the unit becomes the 17e demi-brigade d’infanterie de ligne, made of the following units:
  - 33e régiment d'infanterie, 1er bataillon du 17e régiment d’infanterie, 5e bataillon de volontaires de la Sarthe and 1er bataillon de volontaires colonial of Port-au-Prince);
  - 178e demi-brigade de bataille (2e bataillon du 99e régiment d'infanterie, 6e bataillon de volontaires de Nord and de volontaires de la Seine-Inférieure);
  - demi-brigade d'Eure and Landes (3e bataillon de volontaires de la Eure, 5e bataillon de volontaires de la Landes and 6e bataillon de volontaires de la Haute-Garonne);

== La Grande Armée ==
In 1803 becomes the 17e régiment d’infanterie de ligne. In 1806, the regiment took part in the battle of Jena-Auerstädt.

== 19th century ==
- 1816: at the Bourbon Restoration, the regiment is renamed
- 1854: renamed 17e régiment d’infanterie

== 20th century ==
- 1907: during the revolt of the Languedoc winegrowers 500 members of the regiment mutinied and joined the demonstrators.
- 1914: during the mobilisation, this unit gave birth to the 217e régiment d'infanterie
- 1921: the 17th regiment is abolished

== Sources ==
- Bon, Nicolas, "Midi 1907, l'histoire d'une révolte vigneronne", vin-terre-net.com (in French), archived from the original on 30 November 2010
- Susanne, Louis (1850). Histoire de l'ancienne infanterie francaise, Volume 3. Librairie Militaire, Maritime at Polytechnique.
