= 4th Infantry Regiment (France) =

- 4e régiment d'infanterie
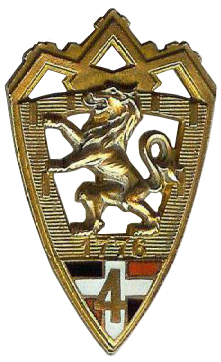
- Active: 1776 – 1961
- Country: France
- Type: Infantry
- Size: Regiment
- Engagements: French Revolutionary Wars; Napoleonic Wars; World War I World War II

The 4th Infantry Regiment was a French infantry regiment. It was first formed in 1776 from two battalions of the Régiment de Piémont; it was disbanded in 1961.

== The Napoleonic Wars ==
=== War Of The Third Coalition ===
The regiment took part in the 1805 Battle of Dürenstein where it lost its regimental eagle.
