= Cessales =

- Commune
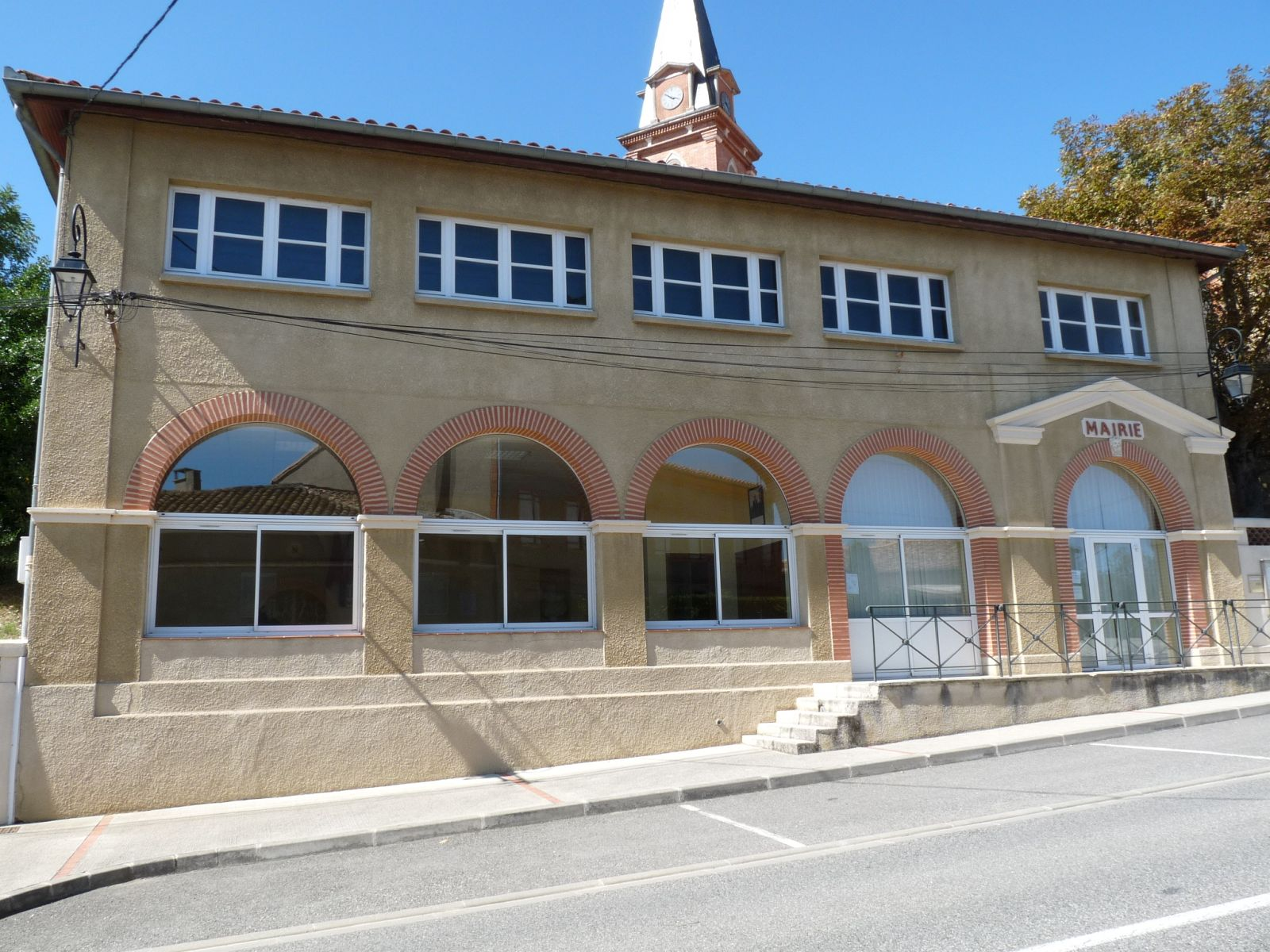
- The town hall in Cessales
- Location of Cessales
- Location within France Location within Occitanie
- Coordinates: 43°27′31″N 1°44′33″E
- Country: France
- Region: Occitania
- Department: Haute-Garonne
- Arrondissement: Toulouse
- Canton: Revel

Government
  - Mayor (2020–2026): Emmanuel Pouilles
- Area^{1}: 3.34 km^{2} (1.29 sq mi)
- Elevation: 225 m (738 ft)
- Highest elevation: 262 m (860 ft)
- Lowest elevation: 186 m (610 ft)
- Population (2023): 168
  - Density: 50.3/km^{2} (130/sq mi)
- Time zone: UTC+01:00 (CET)
  - Summer (DST): UTC+02:00 (CEST)
- INSEE/Postal code: 31137 /31290
- ^{1} French Land Register data, which excludes lakes, ponds, glaciers > 1 km^{2} (0.386 sq mi or 247 acres) and river estuaries.

Cessales (French pronunciation: [sɛsal]; Occitan: Cessalas) is a commune in the Haute-Garonne department in southwestern France.

== Population ==
Historical population
Year	Pop.	±% p.a.
1968	122	—
1975	137	+1.67%
1982	134	−0.32%
1990	159	+2.16%
1999	130	−2.21%
2007	130	+0.00%
2012	138	+1.20%
2017	167	+3.89%
2023	168	+0.10%
Source: INSEE

== See also ==
- Communes of the Haute-Garonne department
