= 94th Infantry Regiment (France) =

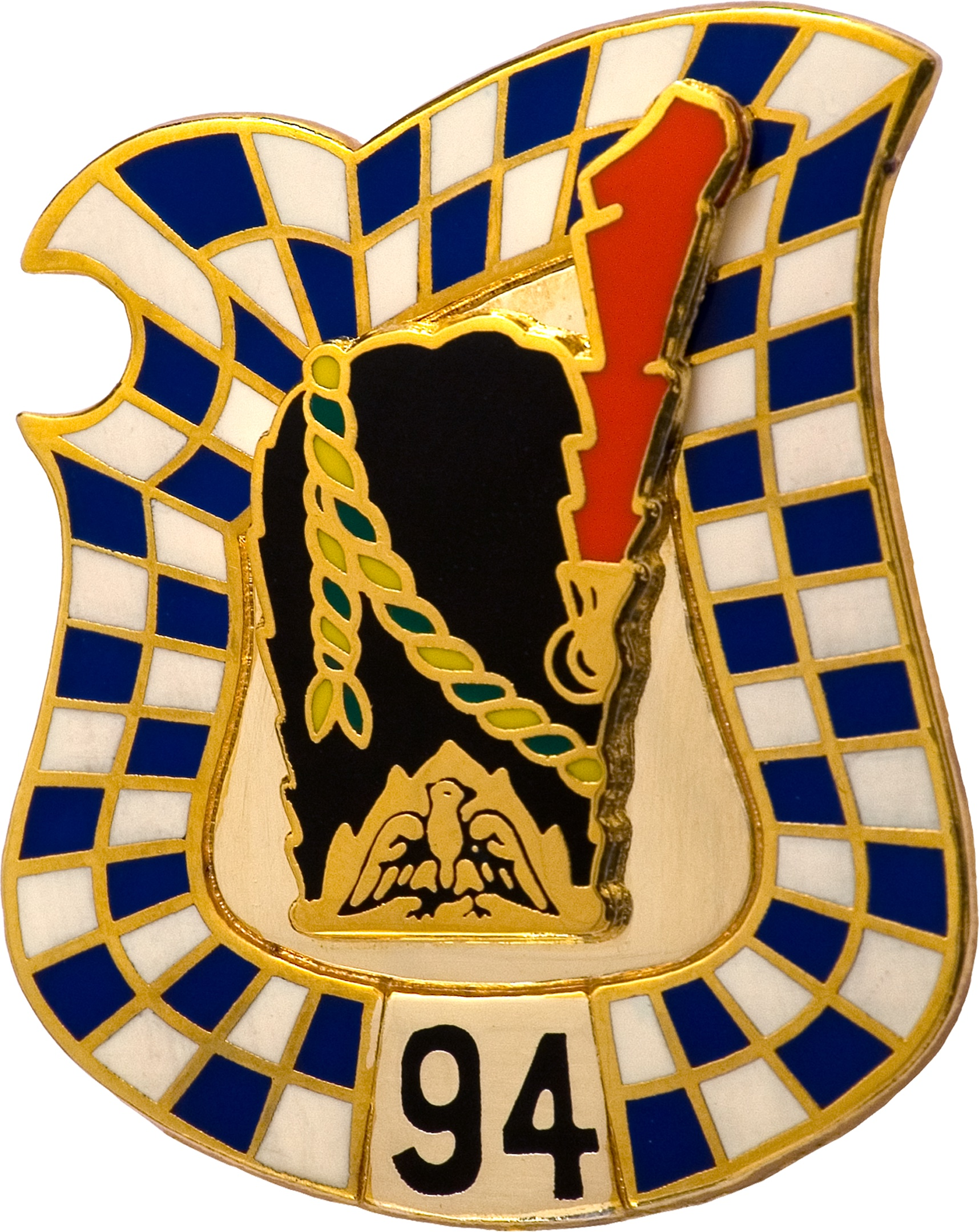
- Flag of the regiment, depicting its battle honours
- Active: 1709–1993, 2005-Present
- Country: France
- Branch: French Army infantry
- Type: Infantry regiment
- Role: infantry
- Motto(s): On l'engage pour vaincre (We engage to win)
- Anniversaries: Saint Maurice
- Engagements: Napoleonic Wars (Austerlitz), First World War (Marne, Somme, Verdun, Chemin des Dames), Battle of France, Algerian War
- Battle honours: VALMY 1792; MARENGO 1800; AUSTERLITZ 1805; FRIEDLAND 1807; ANVERS 1832; LA MARNE-L'YSER 1914; LA SOMME 1916; L'AISNE-VERDUN 1917; MONTDIDIER 1918; AFN 1952–1962

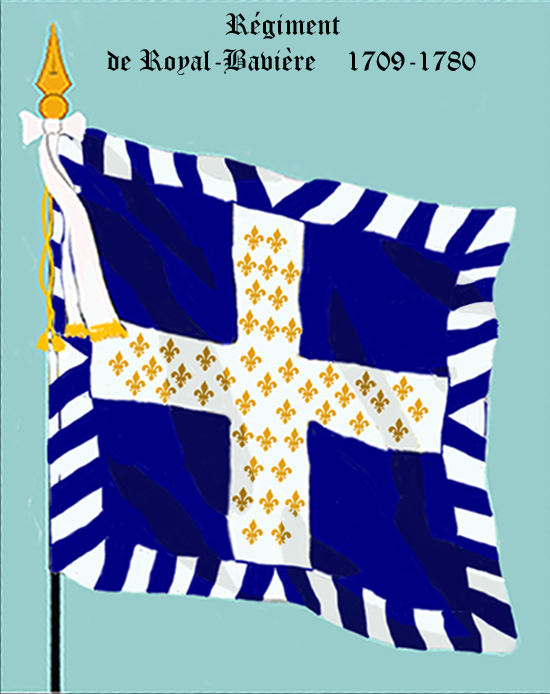
Flag of the regiment from 1709 to 1780

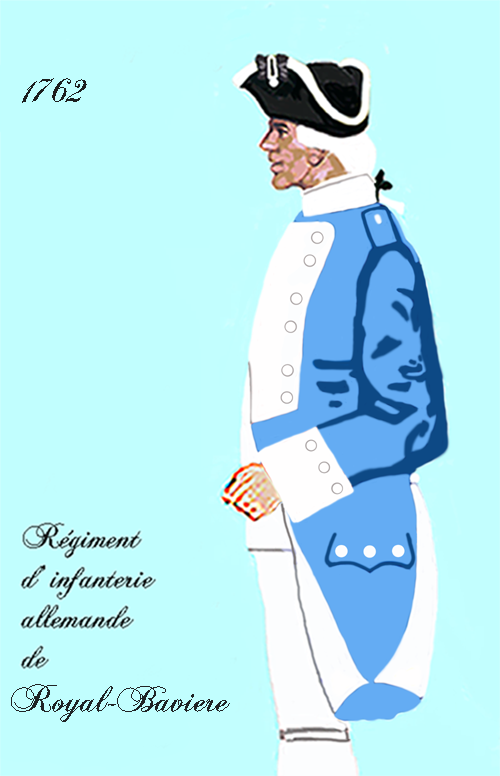
Uniform in 1762

The 94th Infantry Regiment (94e régiment d’infanterie or 94e RI) is a French Army regiment. It originated in 1709 as a German regiment in the French army known as the régiment Royal-Bavière. From 1780 to 1791 it was known as the régiment Royal-Hesse-Darmstadt. It is the inheritor of the traditions of the French Imperial Guard and thus is also known as the Grenadiers de la Garde or La Garde rather than by its number. In addition to its traditions being from the Imperial Guard, their beret insignia is that of a French Imperial Eagle. After having been dissolved in 1993 following the reorganization of the French army in 1993, it was reformed in 2005. Retaining its name and traditions, it is now the regiment in the French army that specializes in urban combat (Combat en Zone Urbain or CENZUB in French).

Flag with battle honors
