= 96th Infantry Regiment (France) =

Infantry regiment of the French Army

The 96th Infantry Regiment (96e régiment d’infanterie) was a French infantry regiment. Like all French infantry regiments numbered 76 to 99, it inherited the traditions of two earlier units: the 96th Infantry Regiment and the 21st Light Infantry Regiment.

== History ==
The 96th Infantry Regiment was first raised on 1 November 1745 by prince William of Nassau-Saarbrück, who had already raised and financed a cavalry regiment. It was originally known as the régiment de Nassau-Saarbrück and was given the numeral 96 by an ordinance of 1 January 1791. The unit was known successively as a demi-brigade and as a regiment during the French Revolutionary Wars and the Napoleonic Wars, before being disbanded in September 1815.

A 21st Light Infantry Regiment was created on 21 August 1792 as a battalion, later becoming a demi-brigade, and was disbanded in 1814. The légion royale étrangère (Royal Foreign Legion) was then formed on 6 September 1815, renamed the légion de Hohenlohe in 1816 and the régiment de Hohenlohe before its disbandment on 5 January 1831. It was replaced by a new 21st Light Infantry Regiment, which was renumbered as the 96th in 1855.

Guillaume Apollinaire served in the regiment as a sous-lieutenant.

== Bibliography ==
- Andolenko, Serge (1969). Recueil d'historiques de l'infanterie française (in French). EURIMPRIM.
- Guillaume Apollinaire (in French). Revue des lettres modernes. 1976. ISBN 978-2-256-90123-2.
