= Dauphin's Cavalry Regiment =

Unit of the French Royal Army (1668–1830)

Dauphin's Cavalry Regiment Dauphin's Regiment of Light Horse Dauphin's Cuirassier Regiment
- Régiment de Dauphin-cavalerie
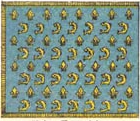
- Regimental standard of the Dauphin Cavalry Regiment
- Active: 1668–1794; 1814–1815; 1815–1830
- Country: Kingdom of France; First French Republic; Kingdom of France
- Allegiance: King of France
- Branch: (Kingdom of France) Armée Royale (French First Republic) Armée Française; Armée Royale
- Type: Line Cavalry; Cuirassiers (from 1814)
- Size: Regiment
- Depot: Caen, Normandy
- Motto: "In periculo ludunt" (The risk of play)
- Engagements: War of Devolution; Franco Dutch War; General Crisis; War of the Spanish Succession; War of the Quadruple Alliance; War of the Polish Succession; War of the Austrian Succession; Seven Years' War; War of the First Coalition; Battle of Waterloo; Spanish Expedition

The Dauphin's Cavalry Regiment (French: Régiment de Dauphin-cavalerie) was a line, later heavy cavalry regiment of the French Royal Army, and the last of its type to be formed by the time of the French Revolution. Formed in 1668, the Dauphin's Cavalry would see service in multiple conflicts, notably the War of the Spanish Succession, Austrian Succession, and Seven Years' War. However, following the French Revolution, the regiment was transformed into a heavy cavalry regiment, and later a cuirassier regiment which ended the royalist lineage of the regiment. After a brief reformation in 1814, the regiment was once again recreated in 1815 after the Bourbon restoration. The regiment then limited action during the Spanish Expedition, and was finally disbanded in 1830 following that year's Revolution. The regiment's successor, the 12th Cuirassiers would serve notably in the Revolution and Republican periods and continues to serve today as an armoured regiment.

== War of Devolution ==
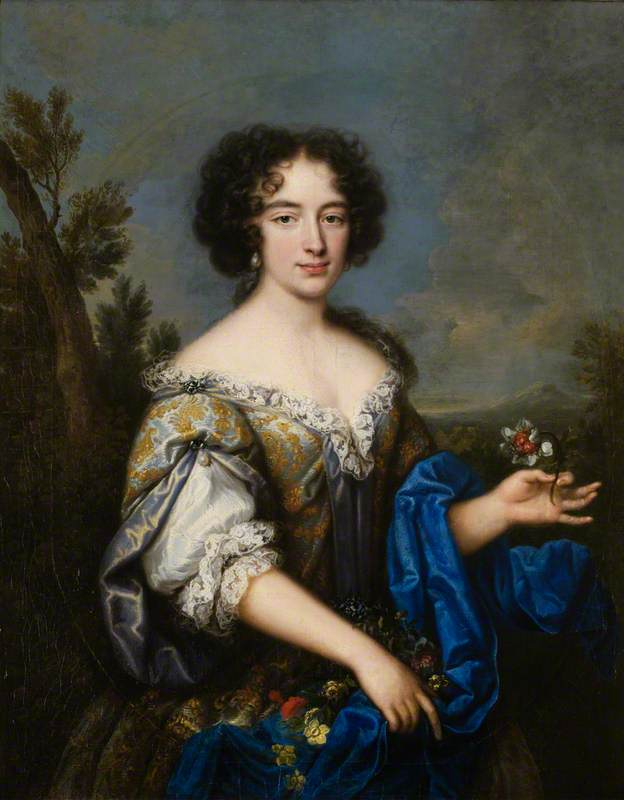
Princess Vallière, who had formed the regiment in name of her brother, Louis, Dauphin of France.

The formation of the Dauphin's Cavalry Regiment is rather obscure, as at the time of formation, two separate groups and dauphins were present in France. According to some sources, the regiment was formed by merger of various independent cavalry companies and one company of the Dauphin's Light Cavalry (Chevaulégérs du Dauphin).

In 1667, following the French law signed by Louis XIV entitled Jus Devloutionis, a large part of the Spanish Netherlands and Franche-Comté was to be recognised as his, thereby being part of France. However, following a short war in 1667 and 1668, the Kingdom of France came out victorious and in the Treaty of Aix-la-Chapelle, these regions, were ceded to France. However, before the cessation of hostilities, a new regiment of horse was being raised within the region, and was handed over to Louis de Bourbon, Dauphin of France, heir to the French throne. The reason for this appointment seems to be unknown, either because he was spontaneously chosen for this operation, or as a good courtier he had requested this favour. The new regiment, affectionately known as the Dauphin's Regiment of Light Horse (Régiment des Chevaulégers du Dauphin) was under command of the dauphin's sister, Louise, Mademoiselle de La Vallière, who already raised and oversaw the new unit for a short period.

Training for the new regiment took place in La Bassée in the Province of Flanders, where it was expanded to the size of a full regiment, and no longer that of a company. Here, the regiment was joined by one of the Companies of Ordnance belonging to the Dauphin, and soon eight other companies from other regiments. It was at this point that the Dauphin handed over operational control to the Marquis de Cornelius. Following the treaty and subsequent peace, on 2 May 1668 the regiment was disbanded and subsequently reformed on the 14th at the size of just one company, bringing it in line with the other regiments of the army. At this time, the Mademoisselle de La Vallière was replaced by the Marquis de Saint-Gelais, who took over previously on 15 April, and would remain commander until 1669, when the company was expanded back to regimental size. By this time the regiment was known simply as the Dauphin's Cavalry Regiment (Régiment de Dauphin-cavalerie).

== Franco-Dutch War ==
By 1669, the regiment was expanded to the size of 6 companies, and in 1672 the Dauphin ordered the regiment into the newly occupied French Flanders region. However, the new Dutch Republic, which had been formally recognised in 1648 became increasingly interested the Flanders region. Following several reorganisation of the army under the Secretary of State for War François-Michel le Tellier, Marquis de Louvois, the French army was rapidly expanded and formed into new field armies, which could at any time quickly mobilise and strike quickly. As the situation deteriorated, war was declared and the Franco-Dutch War began with the French Royal Army crossing the frontier.

The regiment's first objective was to make a rapid advance across the Wallonian region and cut off any planned support coming from the hostile Holy Roman Empire and the dual monarchy of Brandenburg-Prussia. Just a year into the war, the Spanish Empire along with the aforementioned nations joined on the side of the Dutch, and the plans were halted. Instead, priority was placed on the strategic cities in the western part of the county. The first strike occurred at the Siege of Orsoy, then at the Siege of Rheinberg, the Siege of Doesburg, and finally the crossing of the Rhine. The next year, in 1673, the regiment was present at the Siege of Maastricht, which resulted in a French victory at a heavy cost. In 1674, the regiment was present at the Battle of Séneff, and in 1675 at the Siege of Dinant, Siege of Huy, and finally the Siege of Limburg. In 1676, the regiment again saw much action, where it was involved at the Siege of Condé, Siege of Bouchain, Siege of Aire, and the Second Siege of Maëstricht. In 1677 they were present at the Siege of Valenciennes and Siege of Cambrai. Finally, in the last years of the war in 1678, the regiment was present at the Siege of Ghent, Siege of Ypres, and finally the Battle of Saint-Denis.

== General Crisis ==
By 1680 the regiment was stationed in Artois and two years later in the Saar camp. In yet another effort by Louis XIV to fortify and secure France's borders, the War of the Reunions broke out, leading to the Siege of Luxembourg, which the regiment partook in. Just a few years later relations once again fell apart, and the Nine Years' War began with the French invasion of the Rhineland. In 1688, the regiment was in the camp near the Meuse from where it was then dispatched to participate in the Siege of Philippsburg. In 1698 the regiment moved south and took part in the Siege of Mainz, and in 1690 moved back to the western side of the Rhine, and took part in the Siege of Mons the next year. From 1691 it returned to the Moselle only to be recalled again in 1692 to the Netherlands, where it took part in the Siege of Mons, Siege of Charleroi, and finally the Battle of Steenkerque. In 1693, the regiment was transferred to the western frontier, where it remained until the peace.

On 1 January 1690, the cavalry regiments' uniforms were standardised under the Cavalry Ordnance of that date signed by Louis XIV. Under this regulation, cavalry regiments were (for the most part) grouped into three 'divisions' of uniforms which were similar in several ways. The Régiment du Dauphin's new uniform was now as follows: black tricorne with yellow braiding, and white bourbon cockade with yellow centre. Dark 'Royal' blue coat with tan small clothes and trousers, red turnbacks and facings, dark blue saddle, and golden buttons.

== Spanish Succession ==
In 1701 the, King Charles II of Spain died without an heir, leading to a succession crisis which in turn caused the eruption of the War of the Spanish Succession. On the German side was the House of Habsburg led by Charles VI of the Holy Roman Empire who vouched for a Hapsburg line to take over. While on the French side was the House of Bourbon led by Louis XIV who supported putting a Bourbon on the throne, specifically Philippe, Duke of Anjou.

=== Italy ===
As the situation further deteriorated, tensions reached boiling point and the War of the Spanish Succession began. Just before the war began, the regiment was moved south to Savoy to join the newly formed Army of Italy, and shortly thereafter fought at the Battle of Carpi and Battle of Chiari. Between 31 January 1702 and 1 February 1702, the regiment was caught in an ambush, which led to the Battle of Cremona. Shortly thereafter the regiment was involved in the Battle of Luzzara. The army then moved back west and took part in the disastrous Siege of Turin, where the Mestre de Camp (commanding officer), the Marquis de Murçay was mortally wounded.

=== Germany and Flanders ===
After the eventual evacuation of Italy, the regiment was sent north and joined the Army of the Rhine, led by the soon-to-be famed Marshal Claude, Prince of Martigues and Marquis of Villars. The regiment then partook in several actions in the regions of Swabia and Franconia.

In 1708 the regiment was transferred to Flanders where it was engaged at the Battle of Oudenarde and Battle of Malplaquet. From 1712 the regiment was once again in the Army of the Rhine and employed as frontier guards on the river's west bank. As the Prince of Martigues began another campaign, the regiment was once again heavily involved in several actions. The actions included those of the Battle of Speyer, Battle of Worms, Battle of Kaiserslautern, Battle of Landau, and finally the Battle of Fribourg.

== Alliance and Polish Succession ==
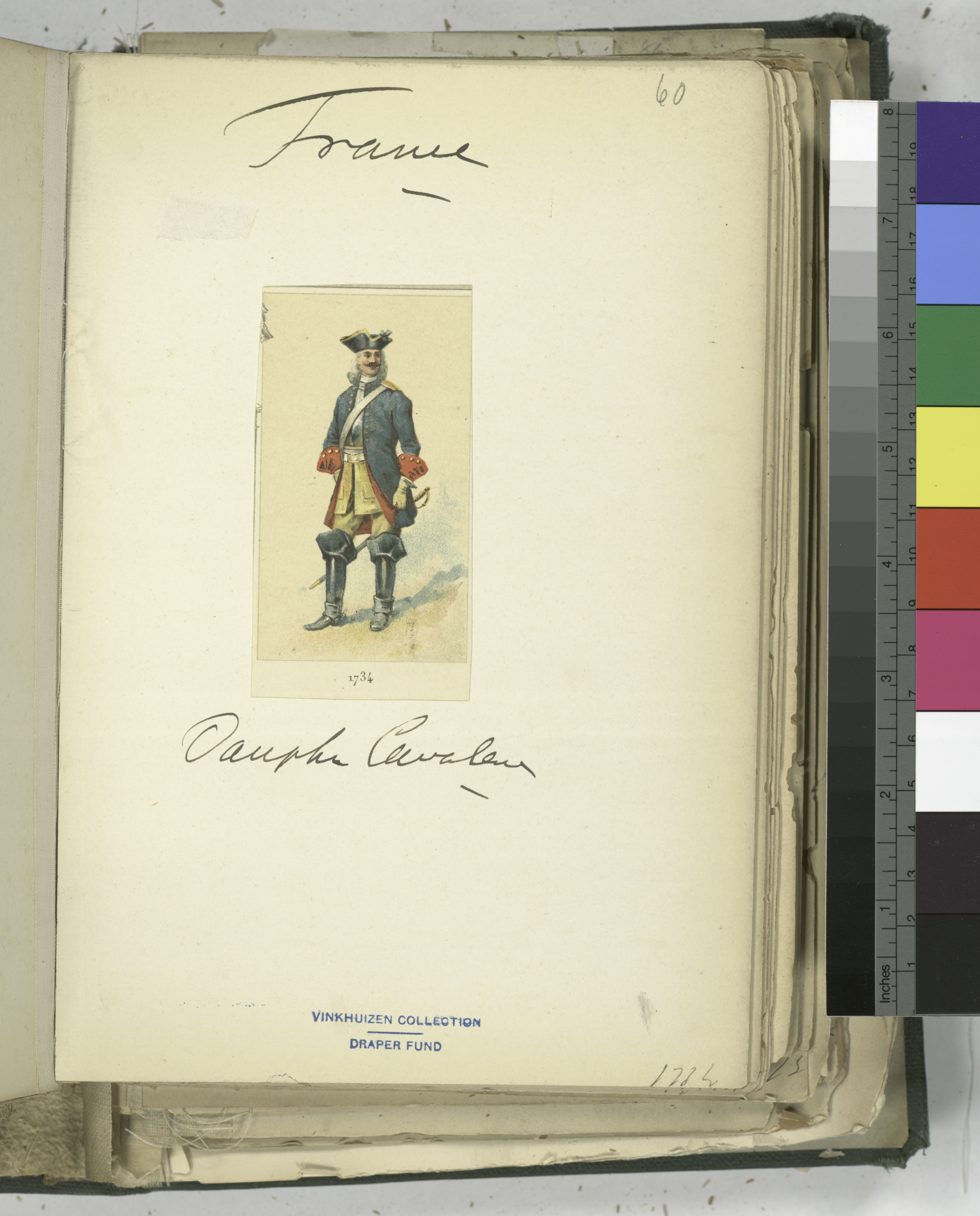
Uniform of a chevalier of the Dauphin Cavalry between the period of 1724–1740

At the end of the War of the Spanish Succession, the Peace of Utrecht was signed in which many of the remaining Spanish owned areas were given up to France, Austria or the Dutch Republic, which was not recognised by the new French bourbon Spanish king. However many of the old enemies were in the same area in which they recognised the treaty and were willing to uphold it by force if necessary. Once again, hostilities broke out in the War of the Quadruple Alliance with the Kingdom of Great Britain, Kingdom of France, Holy Roman Empire, and Dutch Republic on one side, and the Kingdom of Spain on the other.

=== War of the Quadruple Alliance ===
In 1719 in response to the conflict, the regiment was brought up to strength and sent to the Basque Country where it took part in the Battle of Fuenterrabía, Siege of San Sebastián, and finally the Siege of Roses.

=== War of the Polish Succession ===
Just thirty years after a major succession crisis, another one began, the War of the Polish Succession. In 1733, the regiment was sent to Italy and joined the Army of Italy and fought at the Battle of Gera d'Adda and Battle of Pizzighettone. The following year the regiment continued its campaign in Northern Italy, and was involved in the Battle of Tortone, Battle of Novara, Battle of Colorno, Battle of Parma, and finally the Battle of Guastalla. In 1735, the regiment was further involved in a number of actions, included the Battle of Gonzague, Battle of Reggiolo, Battle of Revere, and finally the Battle of Governolo. In 1736, the regiment was withdrawn into France and took up garrison in Caen, Normandy. It was here where the first permanent regimental depot was set up.

== Austrian Succession ==
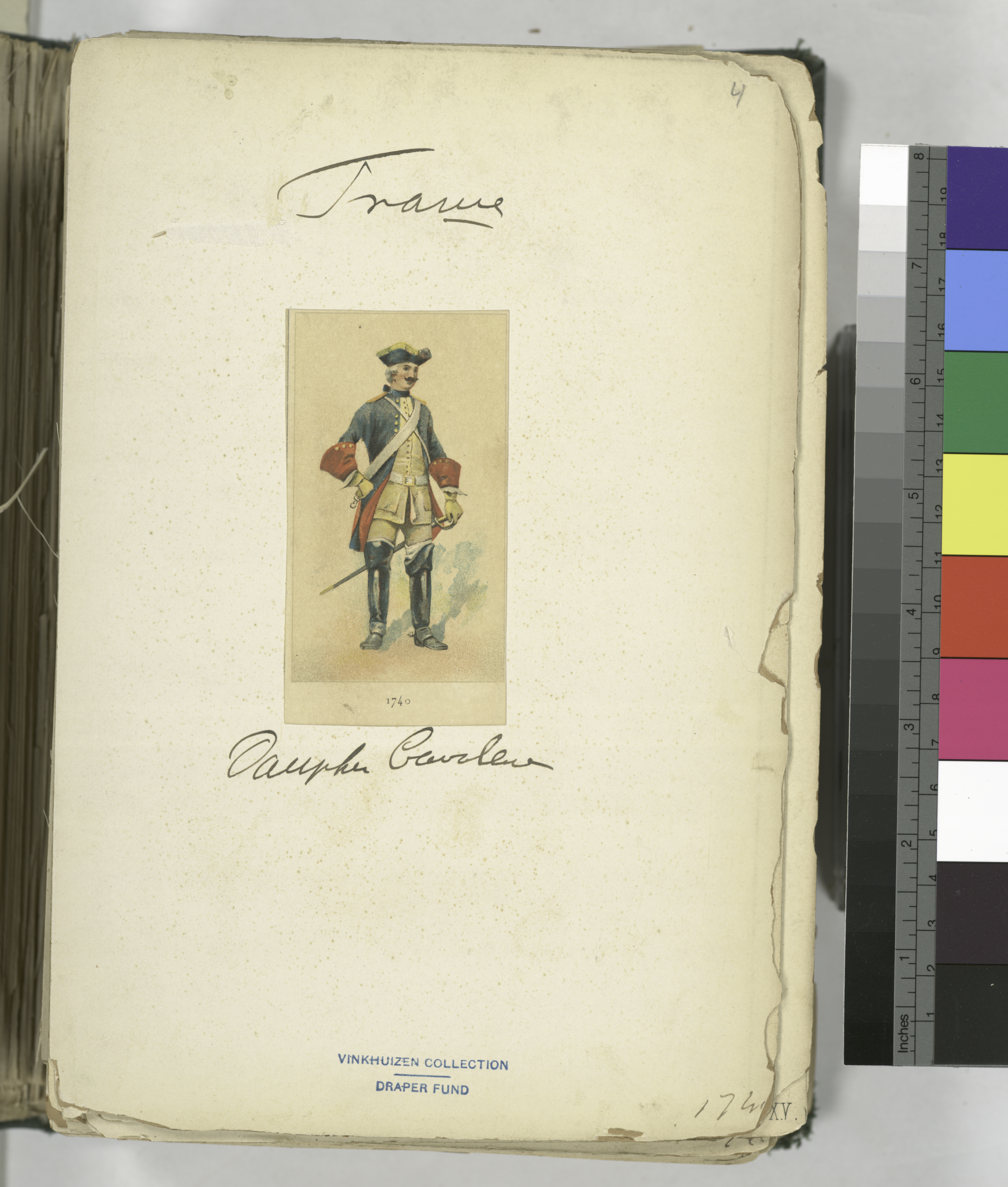
Uniform of a chevalier of the Dauphin Cavalry between 1740 and 1745.

Only seven years following the last succession crisis, yet another one began, known as the War of the Austrian Succession. In 1740, just before the beginning of the new conflict, a new uniform ordnance was published. By this time, the regiment was 15th in Precedence, being just after the Queen's Cavalry Regiment and before the Dauphin's Foreign Cavalry Regiment. Under the new uniform ordinance, the regiment was now uniformed as follows: black tricorne with a white bourbon cockade and yellow centre plume, dark blue coat, golden buttons, silver epaulettes, red turnbacks and facings, tan small clothes and trousers, and dark blue with tan faced horse saddle.

=== Bohemia ===
In 1741, one year into the new conflict, the regiment joined the Army of the Meuse, commanded by Marshal Jean Baptiste, Marquis de Maillebois. On 31 August 1741, the regiment along with the army left its camp in Givet and marched into Westphalia, where it spent the winter in Münster. In 1742, the regiment left Westphalia and marched across central Europe and joined their allies, the Prussian Army in the Kingdom of Bohemia, then part of the Holy Roman Empire.

In 1742, the regiment crossed the border into Bohemia, but after seeing no action, spent the winter in Dingolfing. In 1743, the regiment came to the Bavarian's aid at the Siege of Braunau, and later supported them during the Siege of Eger. During the eventual retreat from the area, the regiment formed part of the reserve element supporting the army in several battles throughout Bavaria. In the winter the army withdrew behind the Rhine and crossed to the west bank, where it spent the winter in Montmédy.

=== Italy and Swiss Border ===
In 1744, the regiment participated in the Battle of Saverne, where Field Marshal Franz Leopold von Nádasdy was defeated. The regiment later took part in the Battle of Soufflenheim and Battle of Fribourg. The regiment was then sent to Italy, where it participated in the campaigns of the Army of Italy, including: Siege of Acqui Terme, Siege of Tortona, Siege of Novara, Siege of Piacenza, Siege of Pavia, Siege of Alessandria, Siege of Valenza, Siege of Casale Monferrato, and later the Battle of Refudo, Battle of Piacenza, and Battle of Tidone.

After spending the winter in Burgundy, the regiment joined the camp at Valence in May 1747, and after joining the Army of the Rhine, and later Army of the Var for short periods, it settled in Lons-le-Saunier. From 1748, the regiment was based in Auch, and from 1749 in Issoire, and even later that year in Saarlouis.

== Seven Years' War ==
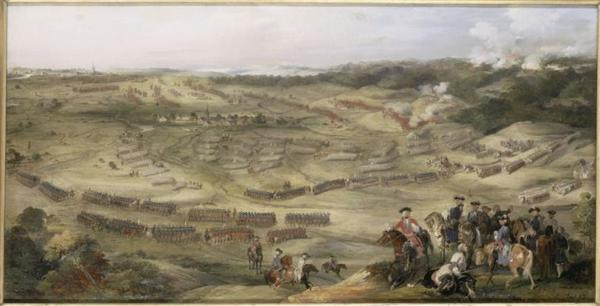
The Battle of Hastenbeck. During the battle, French forces defeated a smaller allied force, leading to the eventual occupation of Hanover by France.

=== Combat ===
In 1750, the regiment moved to Vesoul, in 1751 to Landau, in 1752 to Dôle, in 1754 to Colmar, and in 1755 to the Richemont camp, on the Moselle river. After time in the camp, the regiment moved at Beauvais, then to Lille in 1757, and it was from that came the regiment learned of the beginning of the Seven Years' War.

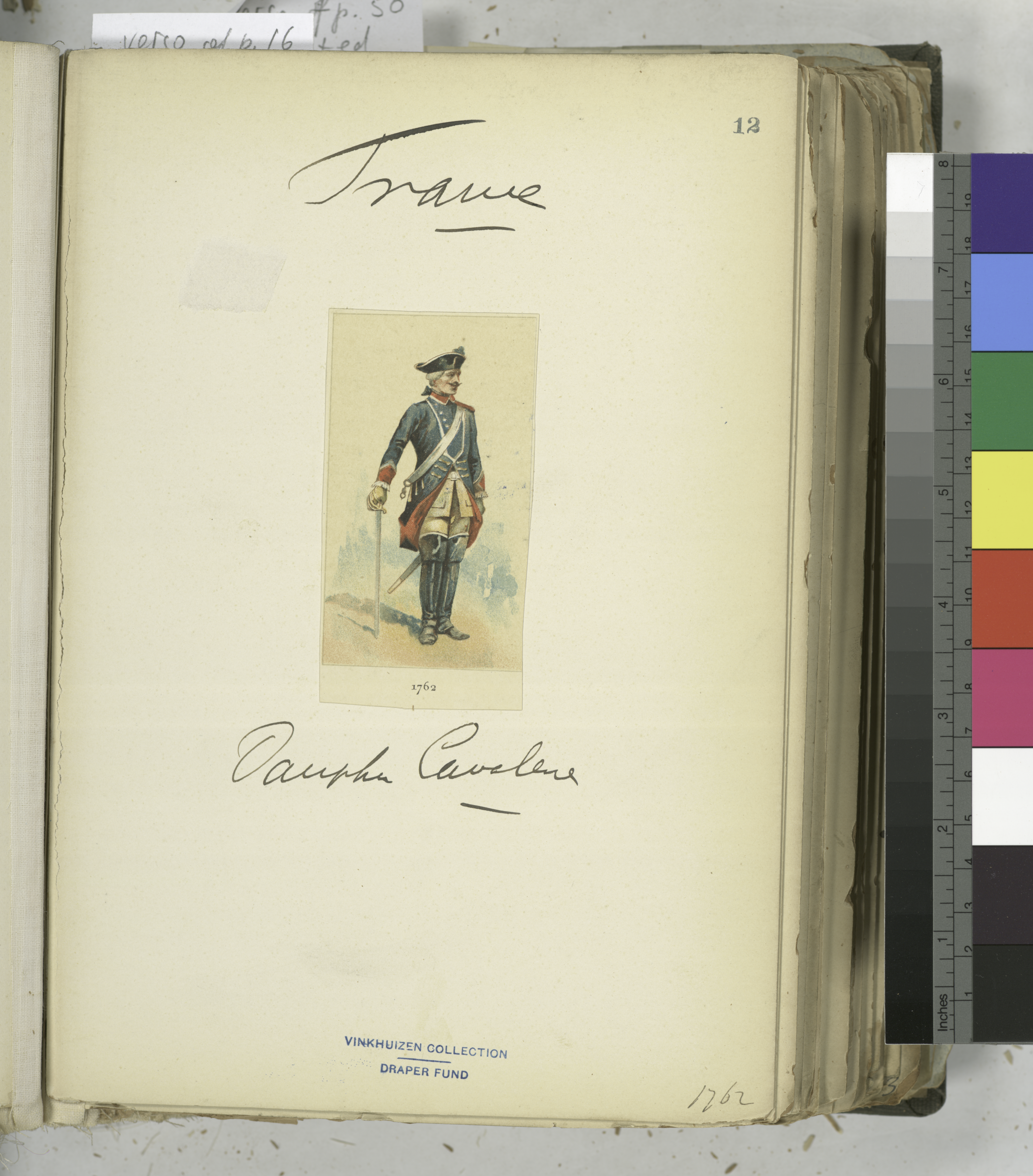
Uniform of a chevalier of the Dauphin Cavalry as it appeared during the Seven Years War.

In 1757, a new uniform ordnance was published in which the regiment was now 14th in precedence, with the Queen's just before and Dauphin's Foreign cavalry regiment after. The new uniform consisted of the following: black tricorne with white trim and a white bourbon cockade. Royal blue coat and reverse with gold buttons, red turnbacks and facings, tan small clothes and trousers, dark blue saddles, and royal blue epaulettes.

In late 1757, the Army of Germany began forming under the command of Marshal Louis Charles César Le Tellier, Duke of Estrées in preparation for the coming invasion of Westphalia and the North German Plain. That year, the army crossed the Rhine river and saw action at the Battle of Hastenbeck and soon after conquered all of the Electorate of Hanover. In 1758, the regiment along with the army was destroyed at the Battle of Krefeld, and retreated back across the Rhine. Following the disaster, the regiment was sent to Vassy to recruit and recover. In 1761, the regiment moved back into the front lines at the Battle of Mulhausen and was present at the Battle of Limburg. In 1762, the regiment was back in Germany campaigning with the new army, but no actions of note occurred.

=== Reforms ===
On 21 December 1762, another cavalry ordnance was published which reduced many of the old cavalry regiments, but brought some of the old ones into higher precedence. As a result of the changes, the Dauphin Cavalry was moved back to 19th in the Line, behind the Queen's Cavalry and in-front of the Royal Bourgogne regiments. The new elaborate uniform was as follows: black tricorne with white trim and small bourbon white cockade, dark blue coat and facings, red collar, reverses, turnbacks, and epaulettes, silver buttons in fours on the coat pockets and in threes on the reverses and facings, tan small clothes and trousers, and dark blue saddle with cheetah pattern trim.

Following the end of the conflict, the army was reorganised from the bottom up. This included the reorganisation of cavalry, so that each cavalry regiment was organised into four squadrons, each of two companies of 54 men each. Each company was therefore composed of a captain, a lieutenant, a second lieutenant, 4 maréchaux des logis, 8 brigadiers, 8 carabiniers (equipped with Modele 1763 Charleville carbines), and 32 cavaliers (privates).

== Long Peace ==
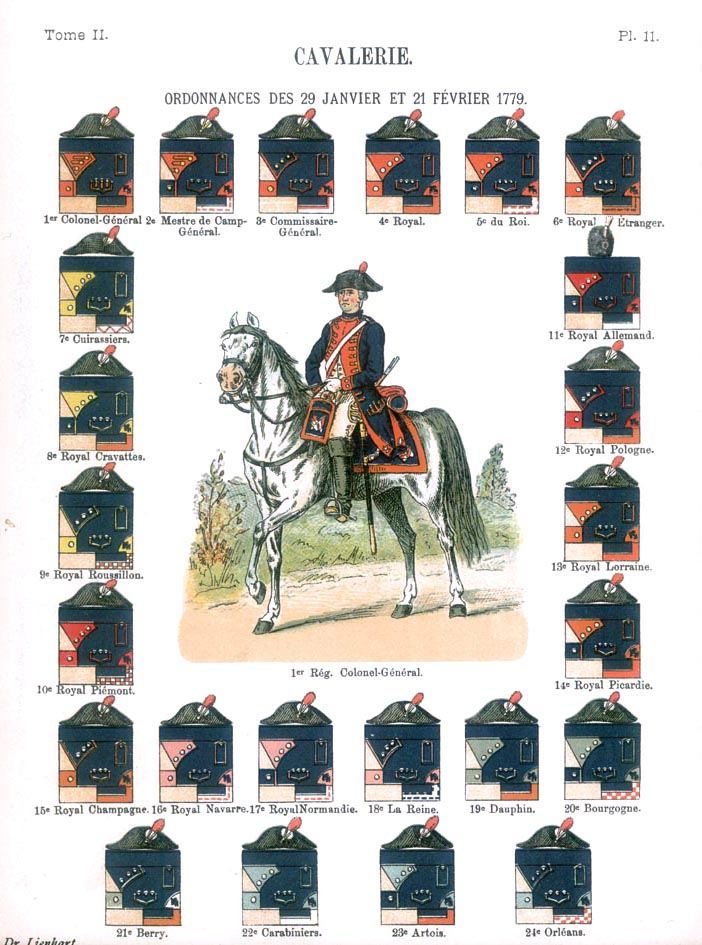
Uniforms of the Line Cavalry under the 1779 reorganisations.

During the Seven Years' War, several Compangies des Étrangers (Foreign Companies/Companies of Foreigners) were formed, including the famed Légion du Dauphin and Chasseurs de Fischer. However, following post-war cuts, these legions were absorbed into the existing units, including the Dauphin's Foreign Cavalry Regiment. Therefore, on 6 April 1763 the Legion was absorbed into the regiment. The regiment then moved garrison every few years: in 1763 at Sedan, in 1764 in Saint-Mihiel, in 1765 to Strasbourg, and in 1766 to Vesoul.

In 1767 a new uniform ordnance was published, which the new 'Prussian style' uniform was adopted, which made them more simple, yet more elaborate. The regiment's new uniform was as follows: black tricorne with white trim and small bourbon white cockade, dark blue coat and facings, silver buttons in fours on the coat pockets, and in threes on the reverses, red reverses, collar (with white bottom trim), and turnbacks, white 'arrow pattern' on end of coat before facings, tan small clothes and trousers, and dark blue with cheetah pattern saddle.

The regiment kept switch garrisons, where in 1768 in Thionville, in 1771 to Doullens, in 1772 in Verdun, then in Redon and Pontivy, in 1773 to Dôle, Dijon, and then Sélestat. In 1775, reforms brought upon by Claude Louis, Comte de Saint-Germain saw a massive reorganisation of the army, which was further reinforced by the 1776 ordnance. The regimental structure was also revamped, with each cavalry regiment now comprising five squadrons, of which four are 'line' cavalry and one of light horse. When mobilised, a squadron of auxiliaries would form a new squadron, while a new depot squadron is formed from regimental personnel. The standard organisation of a squadron now therefore became: A captain (commanding), a second captain, a first lieutenant, a second lieutenant, 2 sub-lieutenants, a maréchal des logis en chef, a second maréchel des logis, a fourier écrivain, 8 brigadiers, a cadet gentleman, 152 chevaliers, 2 trumpeteers, 1 frater, 1 maréchal ferrant, totalling a total of 175 men in total, officers included.

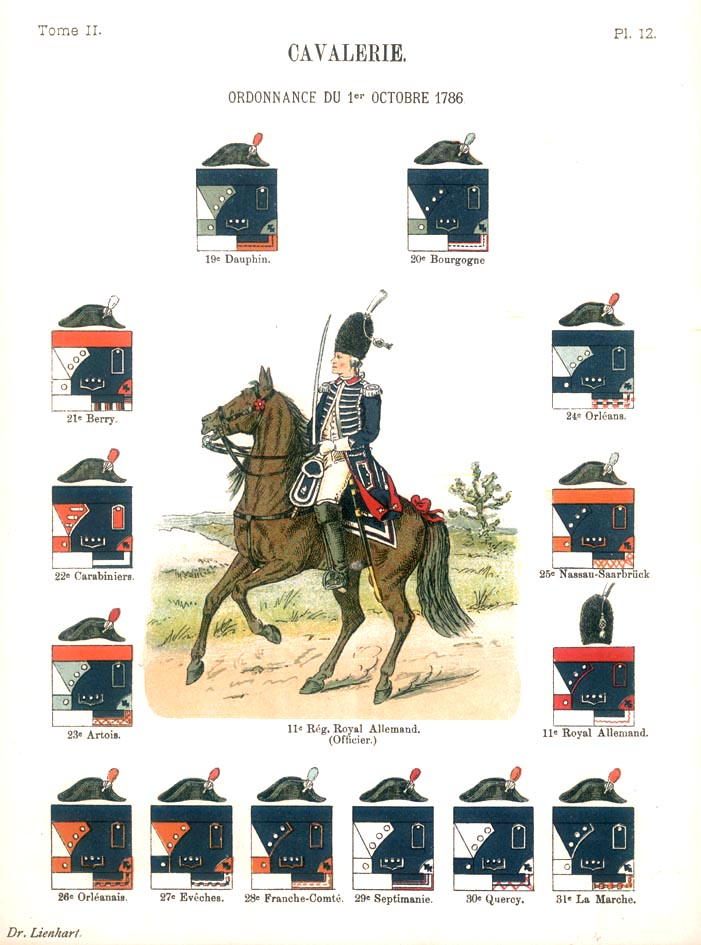
Line cavalry uniforms following the supplementary 1786 uniform ordnance.

In 1776, another uniform ordnance was published in which the cavalry uniforms were standardised with the new 'Royal Blue' tint coat, and the precedence system changed, so that it became the 19th. The new uniform was much different than the former uniform, including the following: black tricorne with white trim and small white bourbon cockade, yellow collar, salmon pink facings, reverses, and turnbacks, royal blue coat, epaulettes, and saddle, with orange trim, and white small clothes and breeches.

In 1777 the regiment was in Gray, in 1778 in Toul, in 1779 in Verdun, Guise, Lille, and Jussey, in 1780 in Strasbourg, and in 1783 in Joigny. On 1 October 1786, further uniform changes occurred under that day's ordnance. Under the far-reaching reorganisations, the higher-cavalry regiments were given new uniform, which differed much from their old ones. The regiment's new uniform now consisted of the following: black bicorne with white bourbon cockade and orange plume, royal blue collars, coat, epaulettes, pockets, and saddle, with orange trim, with a black dashed line through the middle, grey reverses, facings, and turnbacks (with a back fleur-de-lis on each flap), white buttons, and white small clothes and trousers. In 1788 was in Besançon, and in 1791–92 in Gray where the revolution began.

== Revolution ==
=== Revolution Changes ===
Following the beginning of the Revolution in Paris, a new 'Provisional Ordnance' was published on 1 April 1791, where new 'republicanised uniforms' were introduced. Under this reorganisation, each 6 regiments (for instance the 1st–6th or 7th–12th) were grouped into uniform divisions. In addition to the new uniform, the regiment was moved far up in the precedence line to become the 12th, now falling after the Royal Roussillon Cavalry Regiment (11th) and Orléans Cavalry Regiment (13th). The new uniform now consisted of the following: black bicorne with a white and back cockade, green bottom and jonquil yellow topped plume, jonquil yellow cuffs, reverses, facings, turnbacks, button flap trim, and turnbacks, 'Republican Blue' coat, epaulettes, and vertical pockets, white small clothes, trousers, and white trimmed [blue] saddles.

Following the reorganisation of the cavalry corps on 1 April 1791, the regiment's royal lineage was discontinued when it was retitled as the 12th Regiment of Cavalry (Dauphin) (12éme Régiment de Cavalerie). Though it had informally its former title well into 1794, it was still designated as the Dauphin Cavalry until 1794.

By the time of the 1791 reorganisations, the cavalry regiments were organised into a regimental staff and three squadrons (each of two companies). Each squadron comprised a captain, a lieutenant, two sous-lieutenants, a maréchal des logis chef, two maréchaux des logis, a brigadier-fourrier, four brigadiers, 54 troops, and a trumpeter. In 1793, the number of squadrons was increased to four, and in that same year the rank of colonel was replaced by that of chef de brigade, and lieutenant colonels replaced by that of chef d'escadron.

On 3 February 1794, the last of the royalist lineage was diminished following that day's further decree [a supplement to the original 1 April 1791, in which the simply became the 12th Regiment of Cavalry. At this point, the regiment was based in Strasbourg and one squadron (100 troops) detached in Haguenau.

=== Combat ===
At the beginning of the Revolution, the regiment was garrisoned in Besançon and was 12th in precedence of the cavalry of the line. The strength of the regimental officers following mass emigration on 1 May 1792 was as follows: 5 vacant captain positions, 6 vacant lieutenant positions, and 8 vacant sous lieutenants positions. Replacements numbered: 3 captains, 6 lieutenants, and 4 sous lieutenant positions. Remaining positions to be replaced: 2 captain positions and 4 sous lieutenant positions. On 1 April 1792, the regiment was based in Montferrand and was composed of 3 squadrons bringing a total of 468 soldiers. On 15 April 1792 the regiment was part of the Army of the Rhine (Armée du Rhin), based in Haute-Saône where it comprised 427 soldiers and was headquartered in Vesoul. By 1 June 1792, the regiment was reduced to two squadrons in Blotzheim, and the depot in Landau.

In 1793, the regiment was involved a number of actions including the following: Battle of Stromberg, Battle of Alzey, Battle of Brumpt, Battle of Haguenau, and Battle of Gambsheim. In 1794, the regiment was further involved in the following actions: Battle of Rehhütte and Battle of Schwegenheim.

== Restoration ==
In 1814, following the Treaty of Fontainebleau and subsequent exile of Napoleon, the former French Imperial Army was redesignated hastily as the French Royal Army (Armée Royale), reinstated a title lost to history for 24 years. With the redesignations, the old 'imperial regiments' were given royal and regional titles. Therefore, following the 12 May 1814 ordnance, the 3rd Cuirassier Regiment (3ème Régiment de Cuirassiers) was redesignated as the Dauphin's Cuirassier Regiment (Régiment de Cuirassiers du Dauphin). Thereby restarted the lineage for a brief time, until it once again became the 12th Cuirassiers on 20 April 1815. For this time, the regiment was commanded by Louis, Baron de La Biffe and later Jean Guillaume de Lacroix.

During the War of the Seventh Coalition and subsequent Waterloo campaign and at the Battle of Waterloo itself, anti-Napoleon royalists from the cuirassiers fought as part of the Bourbon Cavalry Corps.

In 1815, following Napoleon's second defeat and subsequent abdication, the 2nd Cuirassier Regiment (2ème Régiment de Cuirassiers) was redesignated back to the Dauphin's Cuirassier Regiment. In February 1816, the regiment was stationed in Rennes, Brittany.

=== Spanish Expedition ===
In 1823, an expedition was formed to invade the Kingdom of Spain and remove the Trienio Liberal in support of the King Ferdinand VII of Spain. As part of the Hundred Thousand Sons of Saint Louis, the regiment was mobilised on 8 February 1823 when it left its station in Épinal for Bayonne. At the end of March, the regiment joined the Reserve Corps under command of General Étienne Tardif de Pommeroux, Comte de Bordesoulle. As the campaign began, the regiment was based around Orthez originally, later crossing the Bidasoa on 27 April. As the campaign progressed, the regiment was based in several towns including many which former soldiers resented the names of, like Vitoria (Battle of Vitoria), Burgos (Siege of Burgos), Valladolid (Battle of Medina de Rioseco), and Madrid (Dos de Mayo Uprising), and finally arriving in Toledo towards the end of May. Following the end of the successful invasion, the army was withdrawn via Madrid, Talavera (Battle of Talavera), and Aranjuez before finally returning to Bayonne never seeing any major combat.

=== Final disbandment ===
In 1830, Republican sentiment exploded and following the July Revolution, the unpopular King Charles X was replaced by his more popular cousin, King Louis Philippe I. The new more liberal King Louis Philippe completely reorganised the state and armed forces, including the removal of most royal titles and a complete reorganisation of the army. As part of his reforms, the Dauphin Cuirassiers lost its royalist title and lineage, becoming the 2nd Cuirassier Regiment on 19 February 1831.

== Senior Officers ==
Below is a list of the Mestres de Camp and Colonels.

- 24 March 1668 – 15 April 1669, N. de La Baume Le Blanc, Mademoiselle de La Vallière
- 15 April 1669 – 4 September 1669, Charles de Lusignan, Marquis de Saint-Gelais
- 4 September 1669 – 24 May 1693, Philippe de Valois de Villette, Marquis de Murçay
- 24 May 1693 – 29 January 1702, N. de Wassinghac, Marquis d'Imécourt
- 29 January 1702 – 1710, N. de Clérambaut, Marquis de Vandeul
- 1710–1712, Bénige Le Ragois, Marquis de Bretonvillers
- 1712–1716, François, Duc d'Harcourt
- 1712–1716, César-Emmanuel Colin, Marquis de Lessart
- 1716–15 April 1738, Bénige Le Ragois, Marquis de Bretonvillers
- 15 April 1738 – 3 March 1747, N., Marquis de Voluire
- 3 March 1747 – 11 July 1753, Charles Louis René, Marquis de Marbœuf
- 11 July 1753 – 1 March 1763, Gabriel Marie de Talleyrand, Comte de Périgord
- 1 March 1763 – 18 April 1776, Louis Hurault, Marquis de Vibraye
- 18 April 1776 – 11 November 1782, Hippolyte Jean René, Marquis de Toulongeon
- 11 November 1782 – 1 January 1784, Félicité Jean Louis Étienne, Comte de Durfort
- 1 January 1784 – 25 July 1791, Alexis Bruno Étienne, Vidame de Vassé
- 25 July 1791 – 16 May 1792, Charles Michel Cordier de Montreuil de Launay de Valleriè
- 16 May 1792 – 26 January 1793, François Durand Tauzia de La Litterie
- 26 January 1793 – 4 November 1793, N. Vrigny

Dauphin Cuirassiers

- 17 March 1814 – 28 September 1814: Louis, Baron de La Biffe
- 28 September 1814 – April 1815: Jean Buillaume de Lacroix
- April 1815 – 1816: Louis Stanislas François, Baron de Grandjean
- 1816–1821: Marquis de Beuilpont
- 1821–1828: de Salomon de Feldeck Jean Baptiste Étienne Ignace
- 1828–1839: de Niceville François Hyppolite Théophile

== Image Gallery ==
=== Standards ===
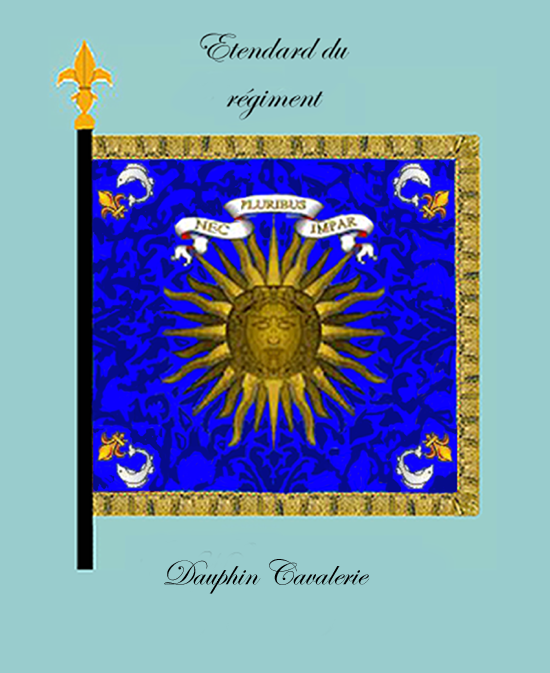

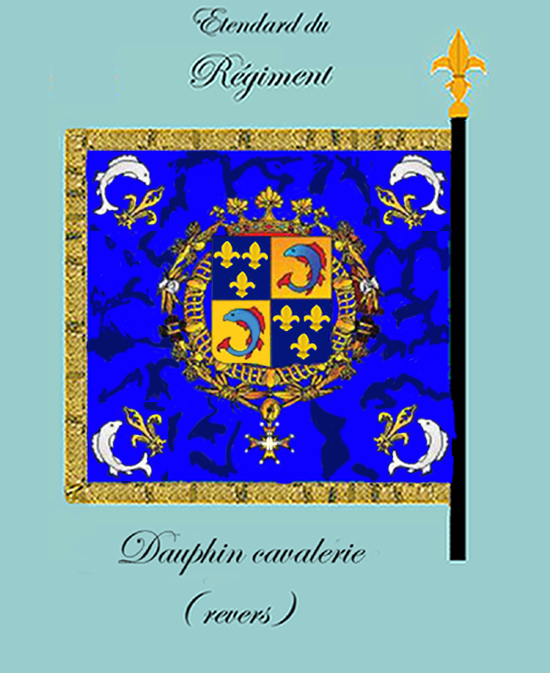

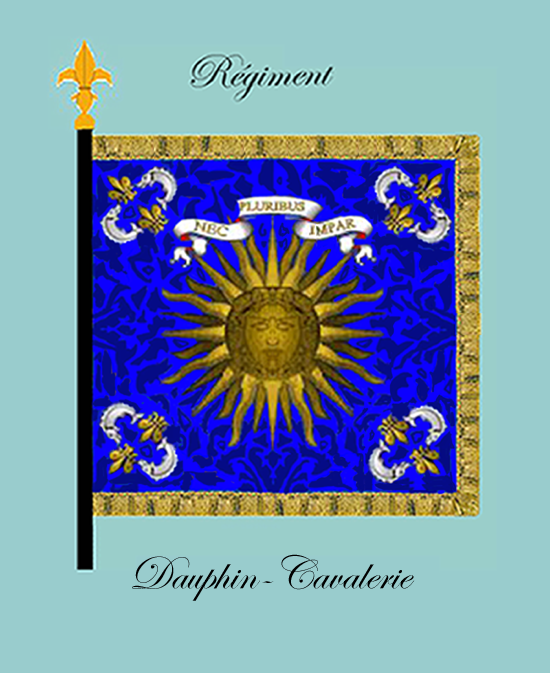

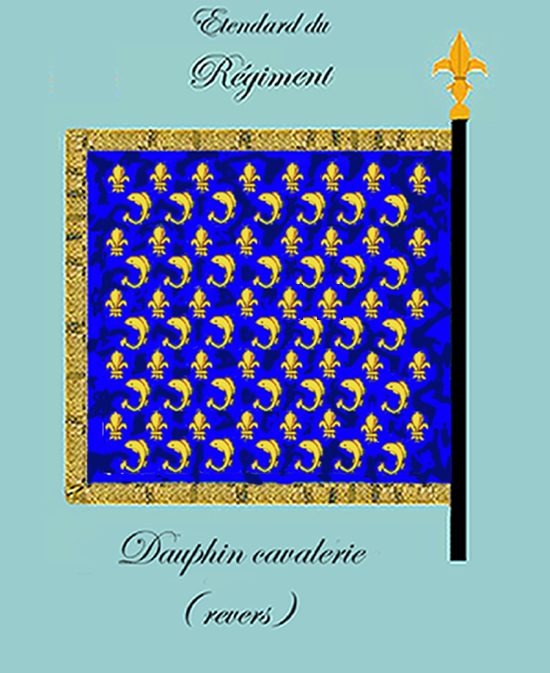

=== Squadron standards ===
Following the 1791 regulations, new 'squadron standards' were introduced alongside their infantry counterparts' battalion colours. Below are the squadron colours (1st–4th).

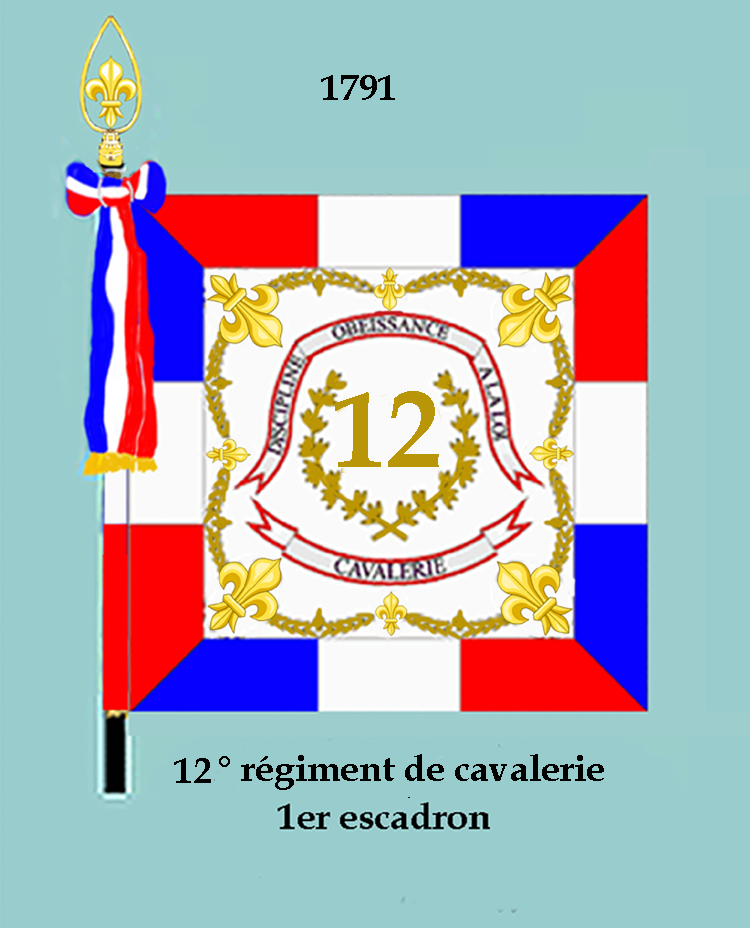

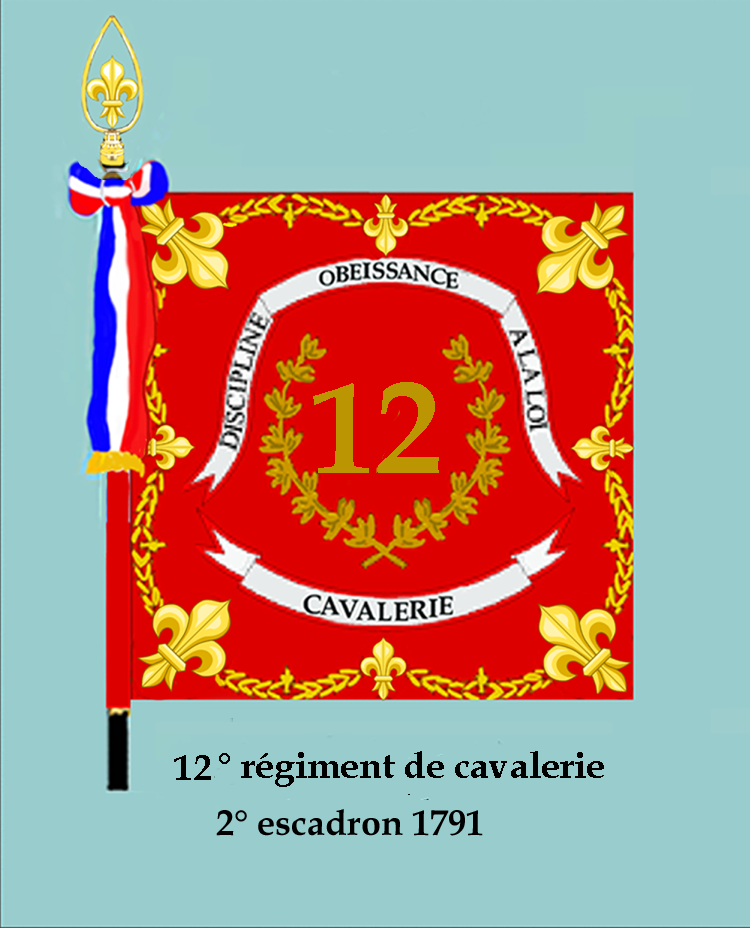

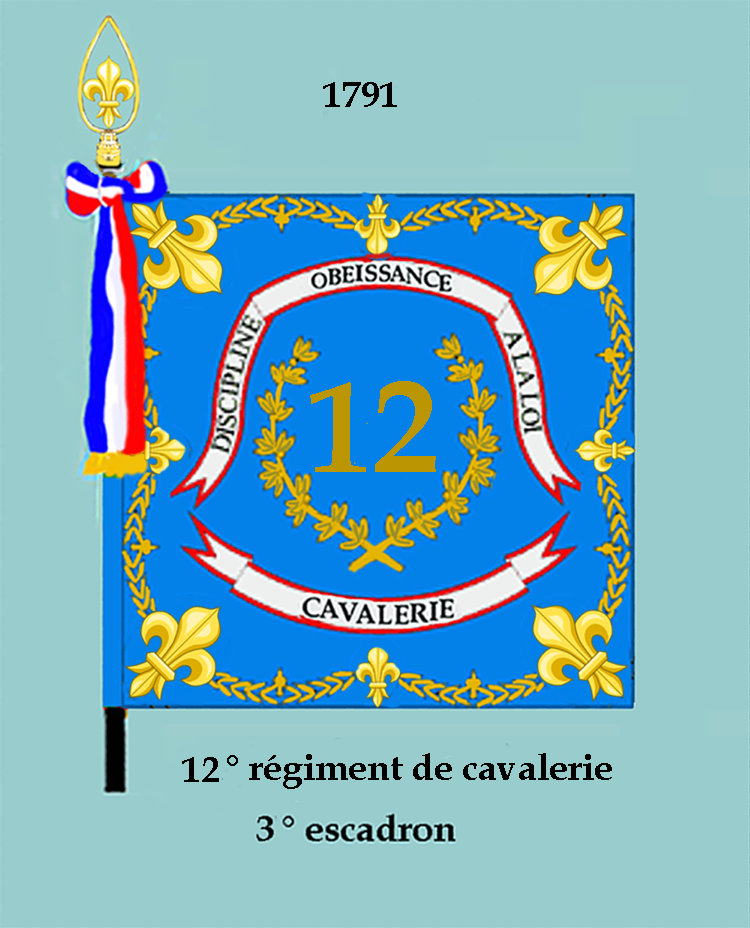

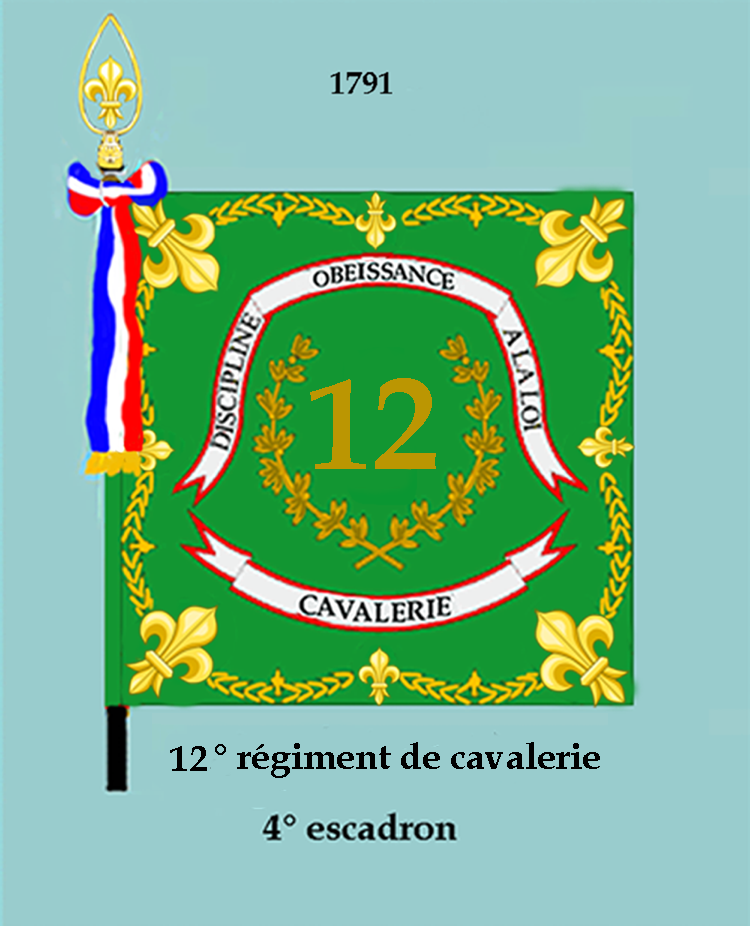

=== Uniforms ===
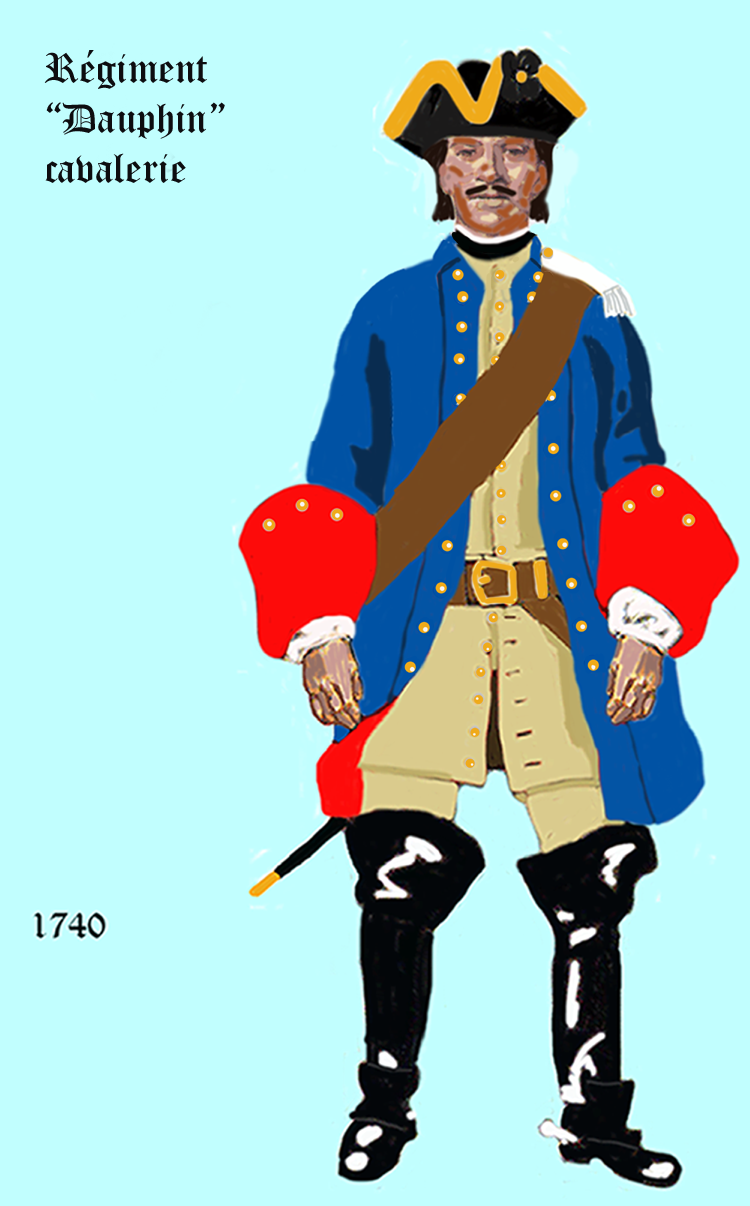
1740 uniform

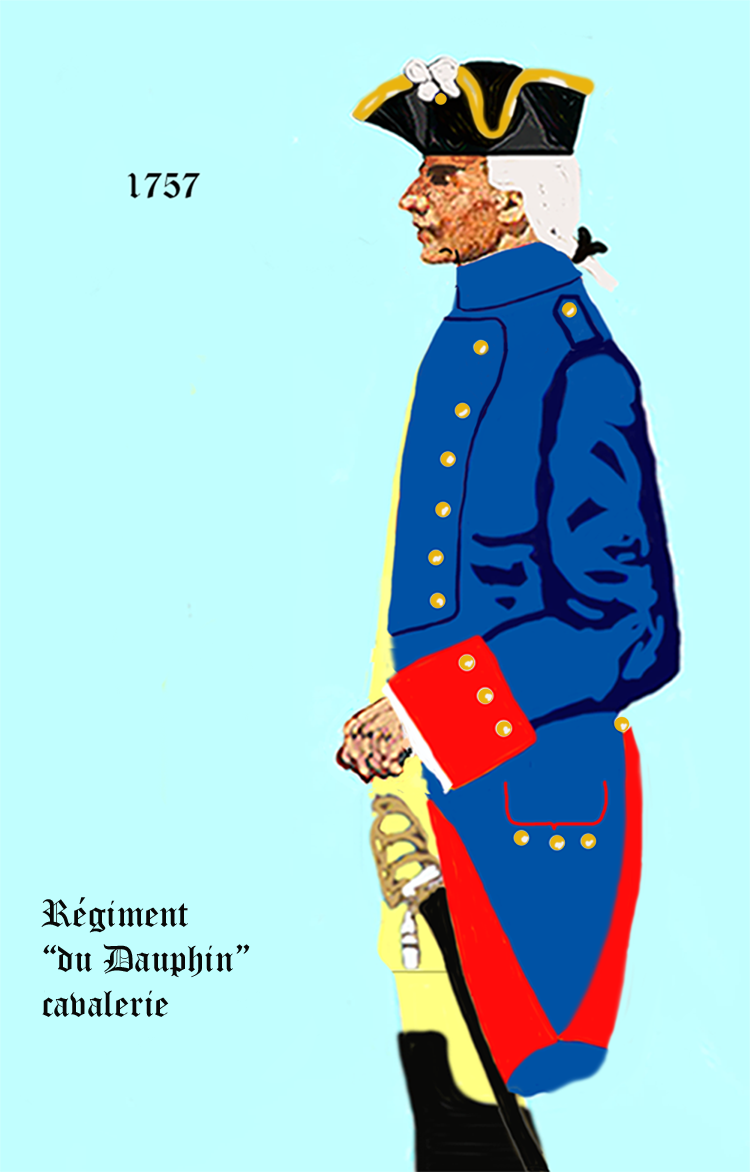
1747 uniform

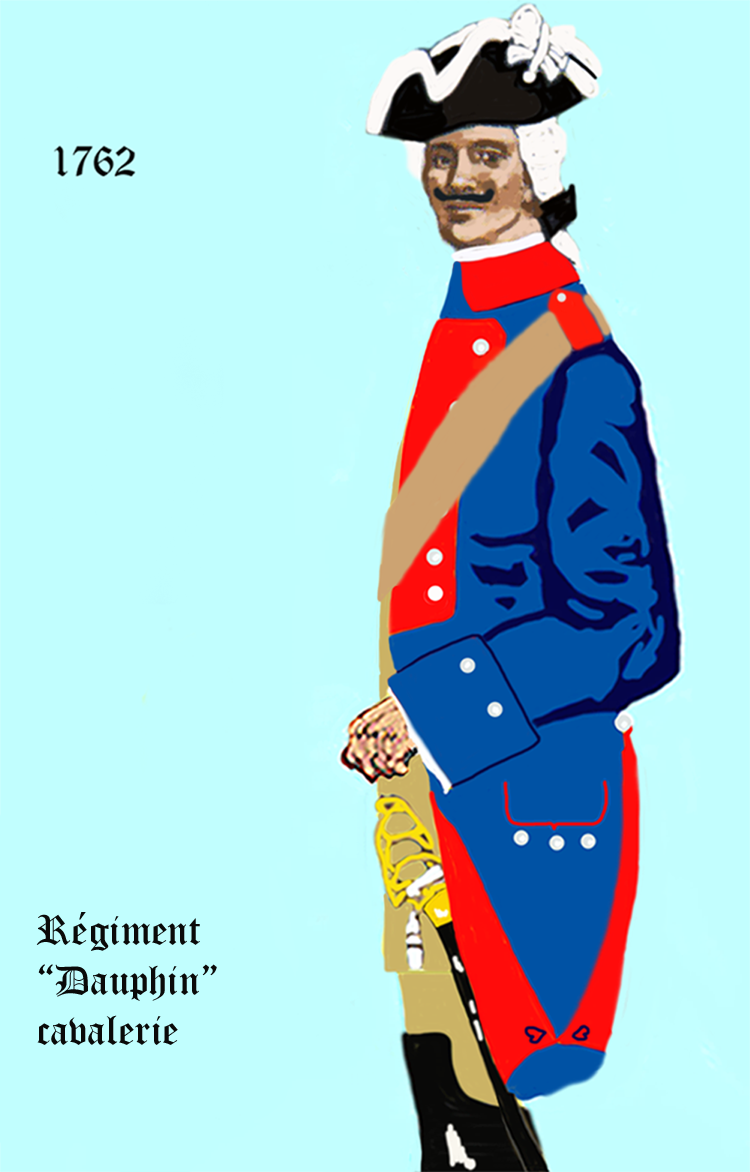
1762 uniform

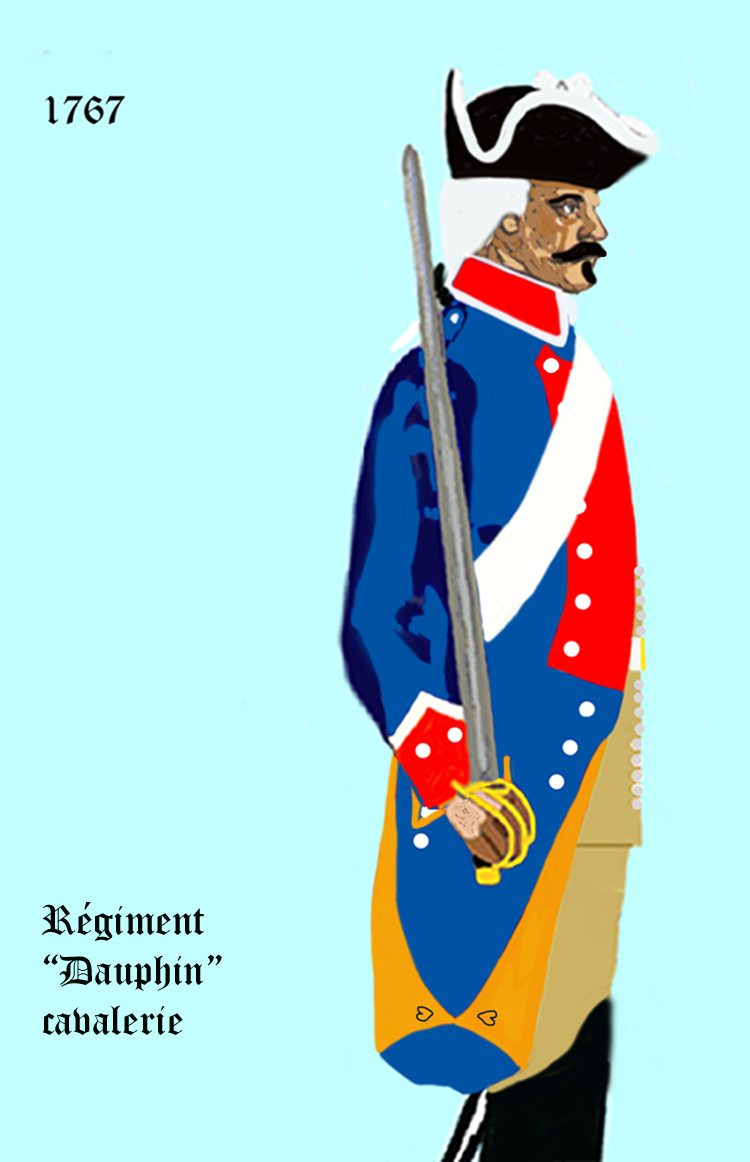
1767 uniform

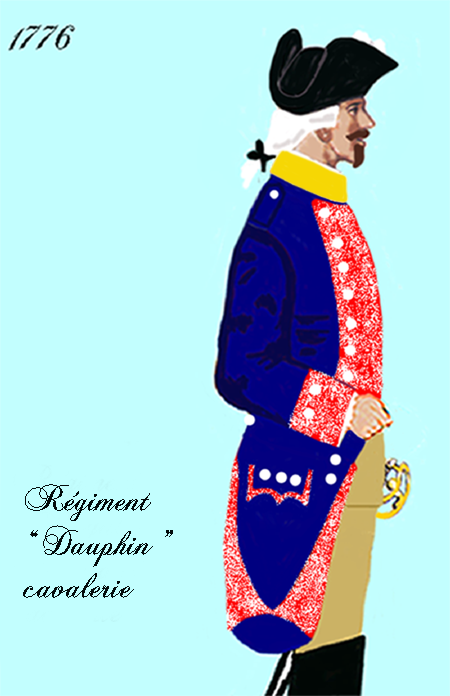
1776 uniform

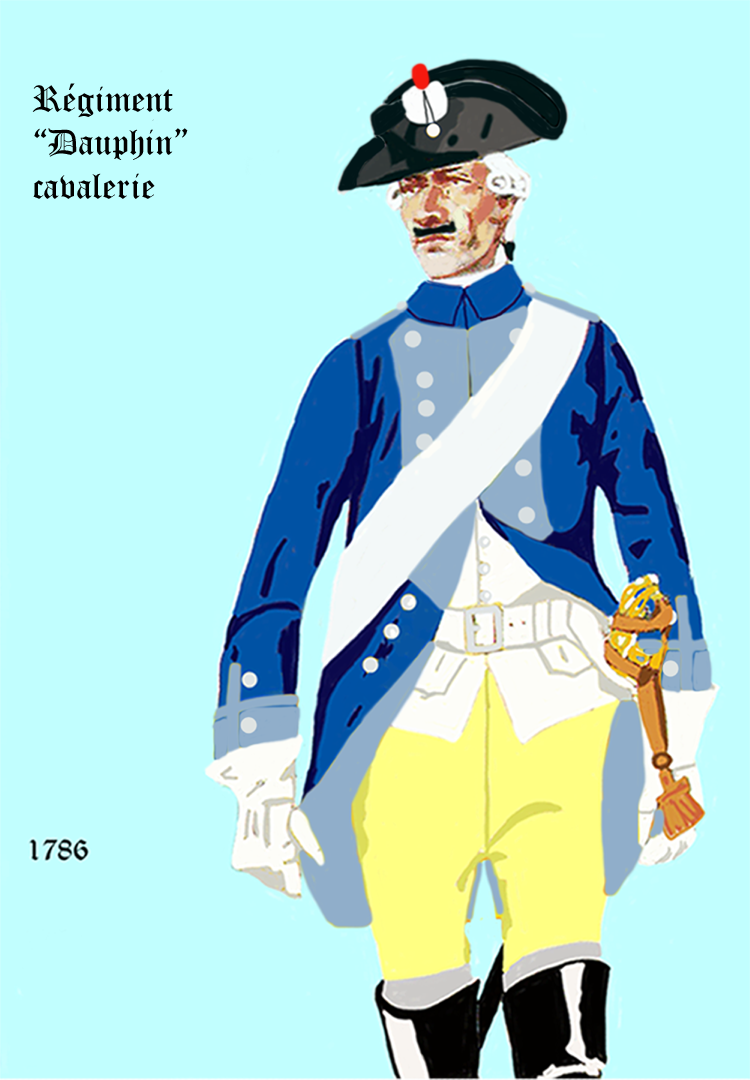
Uniform variation of the 1786 ordnance

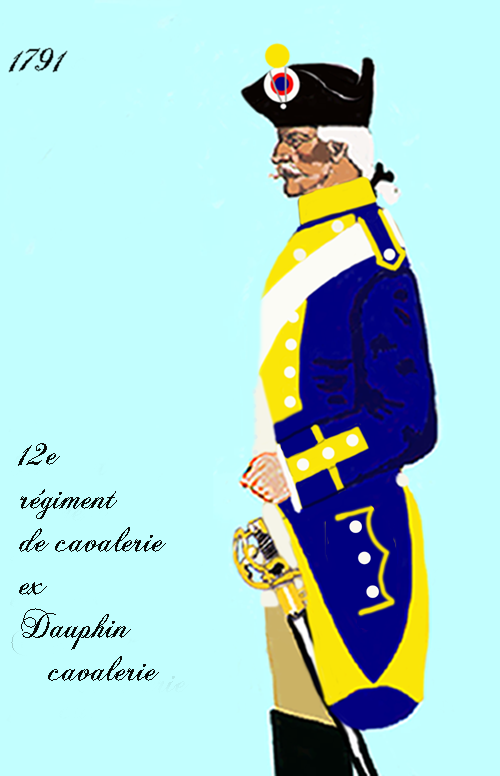
1791 uniform, after the republicanisation

== Type of unit ==
By 1776, the cavalry corps had been reorganised into four 'divisions', though these were purely administrative and had no operational purpose. The divisions were the following (in order of precedence):

- Les Régiments Royaux (the Royal Regiments),
- Les Régiments des Princes (the Princes' Regiments),
- Les Régiments des Gentilshommes (literally the Gentlemen's Regiment, those named after their commander),
- Les Régiments du Nom de Provinces (the Provincial Regiments).

The Royal Regiments were run and effectively owned by their Colonel-Commandant and thus reported to him and were paid by him. The Royal Regiment were also typically named after a member of the Royal Family or extended Royal Family. for instance the King's Regiment, Queen's Regiment, or Dauphin's Regiment. The Princes' Regiments were the same as the Royals, but owned by the Royal Princes of France. The Gentlemen's regiments were named after their Colonel-Commandant, however unlike the Royal and Princes' regiments, these regiments reported and were paid by the Ministry of War. The last group were the provincial regiments which were named after the provinces and regions of France, and were also paid by the Ministry of War.

== See also ==
- French Royal Army
- French emigration (1789–1815)
