= Éléonore Marie du Maine du Bourg =

French nobleman and general

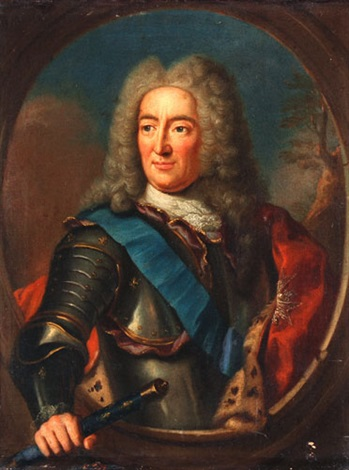

Éléonore Marie du Maine du Bourg (14 September 1655, Changy - 15 January 1739, Strasbourg), Count of Le Bourg, Baron of Espinasse, was a French nobleman and general.

== Life ==
He was the son of Philippe du Maine, Count of Bourg, killed in the Battle of the Dunes (1658), and of Léonore de Damas de Thianges.
He was made a page in the grande Écurie du roi in 1671, before joining the musketeers in 1673. He then moved to the Gardes Françaises. He fought his first campaigns in Franche-Comté, distinguishing himself in the 1674 attack on Besançon. He also took part in the sieges of Condé, Bouchain (Nord), Valenciennes, Saint-Omer, Ypres, Kehl, and Strasbourg between 1676 and 1681.

During the Nine Years' War, he fought as a Colonel at the Siege of Philippsburg (1688).
He became mestre de camp of the Régiment Royal Cavalerie in December 1701 and commanded a Corps on the Moselle in 1705. He defeated an allied army under command of Claude de Mercy in the Battle of Rumersheim on 26 August 1709.
In 1724 he was made a Marshal of France and in 1730 Governor of the province of Alsace.

=== Marriage and children ===
He married twice.

His first married on 27 April 1675 Marie Le Gualès de Mézobran, daughter of Roland Le Gualès, Lord of Mézobran and Kermorvan. They had two daughters and one son ,Claude-Léonor du Maine, marquis du Bourg (died 1712).

He married his second wife in Strasbourg on 14 January 1729, namely Marie Anne de Klinglin, elder sister of François-Joseph de Klinglin, "préteur royal" of Strasbourg, and of Christophe de Klinglin, first president of the Conseil souverain d'Alsace.
