= Bretonvillers =

- Commune
- Coat of arms
- Location of Bretonvillers
- Location within France Location within Bourgogne-Franche-Comté
- Coordinates: 47°13′08″N 6°38′15″E
- Country: France
- Region: Bourgogne-Franche-Comté
- Department: Doubs
- Arrondissement: Pontarlier
- Canton: Valdahon

Government
  - Mayor (2022–2026): Pascal Duffner
- Area^{1}: 13.66 km^{2} (5.27 sq mi)
- Highest elevation: 922 m (3,025 ft)
- Lowest elevation: 445 m (1,460 ft)
- Population (2023): 280
  - Density: 20/km^{2} (53/sq mi)
- Time zone: UTC+01:00 (CET)
  - Summer (DST): UTC+02:00 (CEST)
- INSEE/Postal code: 25095 /25380
- ^{1} French Land Register data, which excludes lakes, ponds, glaciers > 1 km^{2} (0.386 sq mi or 247 acres) and river estuaries.

Bretonvillers (French pronunciation: [bʁətɔ̃vile]) is a commune in the Doubs department in the Bourgogne-Franche-Comté region in eastern France.

== Population ==
Historical population
Year	Pop.	±% p.a.
1968	362	—
1975	308	−2.28%
1982	251	−2.88%
1990	236	−0.77%
1999	240	+0.19%
2007	227	−0.69%
2012	248	+1.79%
2017	276	+2.16%
2023	280	+0.24%
Source: INSEE

== See also ==
- Communes of the Doubs department
