= 2nd Cuirassier Regiment (France) =

- 2e régiment de cuirassiers
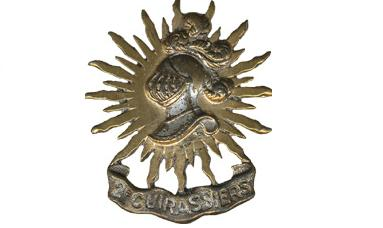
- Unit insignia
- Active: 16 May 1635 - 1991
- Country: Kingdom of France (1635-1792); First French Republic (1792-1804); First French Empire (1804-1815); Bourbon Restoration (1815-1848); France (1848-1991)
- Branch: Heavy Cavalry
- Engagements: Thirty Years' War; War of the Spanish Succession French Revolutionary Wars; Napoleonic Wars; World War I World War II: Battle of France; Cold War

The 2nd Cuirassier Regiment (French: 2e régiment de cuirassiers or 2e RC) was an armoured unit of the French Army, which originated as a cavalry and then a cuirassier regiment. It was descended from the régiment Cardinal-Duc, which is at the top of the list of twelve cavalry regiments created by the same royal ordnance of 16 May 1635 - this made the 2nd Cuirassier Regiment the oldest surviving cavalry regiment in the French Army, until its disbandment in 1991.
