= List of prime ministers of France =

The head of the government of France has been called the prime minister of France (French: Premier ministre) since 1959, when Michel Debré became the first officeholder appointed under the Fifth Republic. During earlier periods of French history, the country's head of government was known by different titles. As was common in European democracies of the 1815–1958 period (the Bourbon Restoration and July Monarchy, the Second, Third, and Fourth Republic, as well as the Vichy regime), the head of government was called "President of the Council of Ministers" (Président du Conseil des ministres), generally shortened to "President of the Council" (Président du Conseil). This should not be confused with the elected office of president of the French Republic, who, as head of state, appoints the prime minister as head of government.

== 16th century – 18th century ==
=== Kingdom of France (843–1792) ===
Under the Kingdom of France, there was no official title for the leader of the government as the monarch held absolute power. However, conventions developed that the monarch would not act without the advice of royal council. The chief ministers (principaux ministres) of these councils under certain kings of France exercised enough influence to lead the government de facto. This situation ended with the start of the French Revolution as the adoption of a constitution in 1791 reframed the power dynamics of the monarchy. As the revolution progressed, the power dynamics continued to shift and ultimately resulted in the execution of the monarch and the establishment of a republic.

Chief minister (Lifespan)	Term of office		King (Reign)
Anne de Montmorency (1493–1567)	1 January 1515	14 June 1541	Francis I (1515–1547)
Claude d'Annebault (1495–1552)	1541	31 March 1547	Francis I (1515–1547)
Anne de Montmorency (1493–1567)	1 April 1547	10 August 1557	Henry II (1547–1559)
Position vacant (absolute rule by Henry II)	11 August 1557	10 July 1559	Henry II (1547–1559)
Francis, Duke of Guise (1519–1563)	10 July 1559	5 December 1560	Francis II (1559–1560)
Michel de l'Hôpital (1507–1573)	5 December 1560	13 March 1573 (Died in office)	Charles IX (1560–1574)
René de Birague (1506–1583)	30 May 1574	24 November 1583 (Died in office)	Henry III (1574–1589)
Philippe Hurault de Cheverny (1528–1599)	24 November 1583	12 May 1588	Henry III (1574–1589)
Position vacant (absolute rule by Henry III)	12 May 1588	2 August 1589	Henry III (1574–1589)
Maximilien de Béthune, Duke of Sully (1560–1641)	2 August 1589	29 January 1611	Henry IV (1589–1610)
Nicolas de Neufville, seigneur de Villeroy (1543–1617)	30 January 1611	9 August 1616	Louis XIII (1610–1643)
Concino Concini (1569–1617)	9 August 1616	24 April 1617 (Died in office)	Louis XIII (1610–1643)
Charles d'Albert, duc de Luynes (1578–1621)	24 April 1617	15 December 1621 (Died in office)	Louis XIII (1610–1643)
Position vacant (absolute rule by Louis XIII)	15 December 1621	12 August 1624	Louis XIII (1610–1643)
Cardinal Richelieu (1585–1642)	12 August 1624	4 December 1642 (Died in office)	Louis XIII (1610–1643)
Cardinal Mazarin (1602–1661)	5 December 1642	9 March 1661	Louis XIV (1643–1715)
Position vacant (absolute rule by Louis XIV)	9 March 1661	1 September 1715	Louis XIV (1643–1715)
Guillaume Dubois (1656–1723)	12 September 1715	10 August 1723 (Died in office)	Louis XV (1715–1774)
Philippe II, Duke of Orléans (1674–1723)	10 August 1723	2 December 1723 (Died in office)	Louis XV (1715–1774)
Louis Henri, Duke of Bourbon (1692–1740)	2 December 1723	11 June 1726	Louis XV (1715–1774)
André-Hercule de Fleury (1653–1743)	11 June 1726	29 January 1743 (Died in office)	Louis XV (1715–1774)
Position vacant (absolute rule by Louis XV)	29 January 1743	3 December 1758	Louis XV (1715–1774)
Étienne François de Choiseul, Duke of Choiseul (1719–1785)	3 December 1758	24 December 1770	Louis XV (1715–1774)
René Nicolas Charles Augustin de Maupeou (1714–1792)	25 December 1770	23 August 1774	Louis XV (1715–1774)
Jacques Turgot (1727–1781)	24 August 1774	12 May 1776	Louis XVI (1774–1792)
Jean-Frédéric Phélypeaux, comte de Maurepas (1701–1781)	14 May 1776	21 November 1781 (Died in office)	Louis XVI (1774–1792)
Charles Gravier, comte de Vergennes (1717–1787)	21 November 1781	13 February 1787 (Died in office)	Louis XVI (1774–1792)
Étienne Charles de Loménie de Brienne (1727–1794)	1 May 1787	25 August 1788	Louis XVI (1774–1792)
Jacques Necker (1732–1804)	25 August 1788	11 July 1789	Louis XVI (1774–1792)
Louis Auguste Le Tonnelier de Breteuil (1730–1807)	11 July 1789	16 July 1789	Louis XVI (1774–1792)
Jacques Necker (1732–1804)	16 July 1789	3 September 1790	Louis XVI (1774–1792)
Armand Marc, comte de Montmorin (1745–1792)	3 September 1790	3 September 1791	Louis XVI (1774–1792)
Constitutional cabinet (supervisioned by Legislative Assembly)	3 September 1791	21 September 1792	Louis XVI (1774–1792)

== 18th century – 19th century ==
=== French First Republic (1792–1804) ===
During the First Republic, there were three arrangements for governance, the leadership of which changed frequently. The first government was that of the National Convention (20 September 1792 – 2 November 1795) and did not provide for a formal head of state or a head of government. The President of the National Convention would only serve for a term of 14 days at a time. Even though the President was re-eligible to return to the office after another term had passed, this rarely occurred. Notable Presidents during this period included:

- Jérôme Pétion de Villeneuve (20 September – 4 October 1792)
- Georges Danton (25 July – 8 August 1793)
- Maximilien Robespierre (22 August – 7 September 1793 and 4–19 June 1794)
- Jean Jacques Régis de Cambacérès (7–22 October 1794)
- Emmanuel Joseph Sieyès (20 April – 5 May 1795)

Given the dissatisfaction with the National Convention a new Constitution was adopted in 1795 which created the a five member executive called the Directory (2 November 1795 – 10 November 1799). The members of the Directory were elected by the legislature who themselves in turn elected a ceremonial President whose term lasted only three months. Paul Barras, who served two stints as President (4 December 1797 – 25 February 1798 and 26 November 1798 – 26 May 1799), came to be the dominant member of the group.

In 1799, the Directory was superseded when a coup d'état headed by Napoleon Bonaparte forced the sitting members to resign. A new constitution was written establishing the Consulate (10 November 1799 – 18 May 1804). While initially a coequal of the other Consuls, Napoleon quickly set himself up as "First Consul of France" and later "Consul for Life" under yet another constitution.

=== French First Empire (1804–1815) ===
On May 18, 1804 the French Senate bestowed the title of "Emperor of the French" on Napoleon and he crowned himself on December 2, 1804. As Emperor, Napoleon was both head of state and head of government under the new constitution.

Chief minister	Term of office			Faction	Emperor (Reign)
Position vacant (absolute rule by Napoleon)	1	18 May 1804	1 April 1814	Vacant	Napoleon (1804–1814)

=== First Restoration (1814–1815) ===
Following Napoleon's defeat in the War of the Sixth Coalition, he abdicated and was exiled to the island of Elba. Louis XVIII, brother of the executed King Louis XVI, was placed on the newly restored throne of the French monarchy. Unlike the previous Ancien régime, the prerogative of the new monarch was limited by the Charter of 1814.

Chief minister	Term of office			Faction	King (Reign)
Charles Maurice de Talleyrand-Périgord (1754–1838) (as President of the Council)	1	1 April 1814	2 May 1814	Independent	Louis XVIII (1814–1815)
Pierre Louis Jean Casimir de Blacas (1771–1839)	2	2 May 1814	8 July 1815	Independent	Louis XVIII (1814–1815)

=== Hundred Days (1815) ===
In March 1815, Napoleon left his exile and returned to France. The government of the Louis XVIII fled to the city of Ghent. Napoleon reinstated his role as both head of state and head of government. Upon Napoleon's second abdication, his son Napoleon II was named Emperor. This rule was nominal, and Napoleon II, then a four-year old child, remained in Austria throughout his nominal reign.

Chief Minister	Term of office			Faction	Emperor (Reign)
Position vacant (absolute rule by Napoleon I)	2	20 March 1815	22 June 1815	Vacant	Napoleon I (1815)
Joseph Fouché (1759–1820) (as President of the Executive Commission)	•	22 June 1815	7 July 1815	Bonapartist	Napoleon II (1815)

=== Bourbon Restoration (1815–1830) ===
Following his second defeat at the Battle of Waterloo, Napoleon was again exiled, this time to the island of St. Helena. Louis XVIII returned to Paris and to his role as constitutional monarch.

==== Presidents of the Council of Ministers ====
President of the Council of Ministers (Lifespan)	Term of office				Faction	Legislature (Election)	King (Reign)
President of the Council of Ministers (Lifespan)	Tenure			Duration	Faction	Legislature (Election)	King (Reign)
Charles Maurice de Talleyrand-Périgord (1754–1838)	•	9 July 1815	26 September 1815	79 days	Independent	I (Chambre introuvable) (1815)	Louis XVIII (1815–1824)
Armand-Emmanuel de Vignerot du Plessis, Duc de Richelieu (1766–1822)	1	26 September 1815	29 December 1818	3 years, 94 days	Independent	I (Chambre introuvable) (1815)	Louis XVIII (1815–1824)
Jean-Joseph, Marquis Dessolles (1767–1828)	•	29 December 1818	19 November 1819	325 days	Doctrinaires	II (1816)	Louis XVIII (1815–1824)
Élie Decazes, duc de Glücksbierg and Decazes (1780–1860)	•	19 November 1819	20 February 1820	93 days	Doctrinaires	II (1816)	Louis XVIII (1815–1824)
Armand-Emmanuel de Vignerot du Plessis, Duc de Richelieu (1766–1822)	2	20 February 1820	14 December 1821	1 year, 297 days	Doctrinaires	III (1820)	Louis XVIII (1815–1824)
Jean-Baptiste de Villèle (1773–1854)	•	14 December 1821	4 January 1828	6 years, 21 days	Ultra-royalist	III (1820)	Louis XVIII (1815–1824)
Jean-Baptiste de Villèle (1773–1854)	•	14 December 1821	4 January 1828	6 years, 21 days	Ultra-royalist	IV (1824)	Charles X (1824–1830)
Jean Baptiste Gay, vicomte de Martignac (1778–1832)	•	4 January 1828	8 August 1829	1 year, 216 days	Doctrinaires	V (1827)	Charles X (1824–1830)
Jules de Polignac, duc de Polignac (1780–1847)	•	8 August 1829	29 July 1830	355 days	Ultra-royalist	V (1827)	Charles X (1824–1830)
Casimir de Rochechouart, duc de Mortemart (1787–1875)	•	29 July 1830		0 days	Ultra-royalist	V (1827)	Charles X (1824–1830)

=== July Monarchy (1830–1848) ===
When King Charles X was crowned he swore to uphold the constitutional Charter of 1814, but as his reign progressed he was seen to be increasingly in conflict with it. In 1830 the tension came to a climax when Charles dissolved the legislature, suspended certain liberties, and barred the middle class from participating in future elections. These July Ordinances in turn triggered outrage in Paris which resulted in the July Revolution. The revolution resulted in Charles X abdicating the throne in favor of his cousin Louis Philippe, Duke of Orléans who promised to maintain a liberal constitutional monarchy under the Charter of 1830. Unlike the previous Charter, which was self-imposed by the monarch, the 1830 charter emanated from the people. This popular monarchy was reflected in Louis Philippe's title of "King of the French" (roi des Français) rather than "King of France" (roi de France).

==== Presidents of the Council of Ministers ====
Factions

Independent
Orléanist
Doctrinaires/Movement Party
Resistance Party

President of the Council of Ministers (Lifespan)	Term of office				Faction	Legislature (Election)	King (Reign)
President of the Council of Ministers (Lifespan)	Tenure			Duration	Faction	Legislature (Election)	King (Reign)
Position vacant (government led by Louis Philippe I)	(0); 1	1 August 1830	2 November 1830	93 days	Orléanist	I (1830)	Louis Philippe I (1830–1848)
Jacques Laffitte (1767–1844)	•	2 November 1830	13 March 1831	131 days	Orléanist	I (1830)	Louis Philippe I (1830–1848)
Casimir Pierre Périer (1777–1832)	•	13 March 1831	16 May 1832	1 year, 64 days	Resistance Party	II (1831)	Louis Philippe I (1830–1848)
Jean-de-Dieu Soult (1769–1851)	1	11 October 1832	18 July 1834	1 year, 280 days	Orléanist	II (1831)	Louis Philippe I (1830–1848)
Étienne Maurice Gérard (1773–1852)	•	18 July 1834	10 November 1834	115 days	Independent	III (1834)	Louis Philippe I (1830–1848)
Hugues-Bernard Maret (1763–1839)	•	10 November 1834	18 November 1834	8 days	Independent	III (1834)	Louis Philippe I (1830–1848)
Édouard Mortier (1768–1835)	•	18 November 1834	12 March 1835	114 days	Resistance Party	III (1834)	Louis Philippe I (1830–1848)
Victor de Broglie (1785–1870)	•	12 March 1835	22 February 1836	347 days	Resistance Party	III (1834)	Louis Philippe I (1830–1848)
Adolphe Thiers (1797–1877)	1	22 February 1836	6 September 1836	197 days	Movement Party	III (1834)	Louis Philippe I (1830–1848)
Louis-Mathieu Molé (1781–1855)	1	6 September 1836	31 March 1839	2 years, 206 days	Resistance Party	III (1834)	Louis Philippe I (1830–1848)
Louis-Mathieu Molé (1781–1855)	2	6 September 1836	31 March 1839	2 years, 206 days	Resistance Party	IV (1837)	Louis Philippe I (1830–1848)
Position vacant (government led by Louis Philippe I)	2	31 March 1839	12 May 1839	42 days	Orléanist	IV (1837)	Louis Philippe I (1830–1848)
Jean-de-Dieu Soult (1769–1851)	2	12 May 1839	1 March 1840	294 days	Resistance Party	V (1839)	Louis Philippe I (1830–1848)
Adolphe Thiers (1797–1877)	2	1 March 1840	29 October 1840	242 days	Movement Party	V (1839)	Louis Philippe I (1830–1848)
Jean-de-Dieu Soult (1769–1851)	3	29 October 1840	19 September 1847	6 years, 325 days	Resistance Party	VI (1842)	Louis Philippe I (1830–1848)
François Guizot (1787–1874)	•	19 September 1847	23 February 1848	157 days	Resistance Party	VII (1846)	Louis Philippe I (1830–1848)
Louis-Mathieu Molé (1781–1855)	•	23 February 1848	24 February 1848	1 day	Resistance Party	VII (1846)	Louis Philippe I (1830–1848)

=== Second French Republic (1848–1852) ===
The popularity of the new "Citizen King" declined over concerns that the suffrage of the populace was extremely limited to certain property owners. The desire to expand the electorate to a more universal male suffrage was undercut by a 1835 law which prohibited public political assemblies. To circumvent this ban, in 1847 a series of private meeting known as the campagne des banquets were organized. When these banquets were themselves banned popular unrest spilled into the streets in the February Revolution of 1848, which resulted in King Louis Philippe abdicating the throne and triggered a series of revolutions across Europe. A provisional government proclaimed a Second Republic, which would organized under a new constitution which provided for the election of a President. Louis-Napoléon Bonaparte, nephew of the former Emperor, won the subsequent election in a landslide.

==== Presidents of the Council of Ministers ====
President of the Council of Ministers (Lifespan)		Term of office				Faction	Legislature (Election)	President (Term)	
President of the Council of Ministers (Lifespan)		Tenure			Duration	Faction	Legislature (Election)	President (Term)	
1	Jacques-Charles Dupont de l'Eure (1767–1855)	•	24 February 1848	9 May 1848	75 days	Moderate Republican	Const. (1848)		Himself de facto (Provisional)
2	François Arago (1786–1853)	•	10 May 1848	24 June 1848	45 days	Moderate Republican	Const. (1848)		Executive Commission
3	Louis-Eugène Cavaignac (1802–1857)	•	28 June 1848	20 December 1848	175 days	Moderate Republican	Const. (1848)		Himself de facto (Martial Law)
4	Odilon Barrot (1791–1873)	1	20 December 1848	31 October 1849	315 days	Party of Order	Const. (1848)	1	Louis-Napoléon Bonaparte (1848–1852)
4	Odilon Barrot (1791–1873)	2	20 December 1848	31 October 1849	315 days	Party of Order	Leg. (1849)	1	Louis-Napoléon Bonaparte (1848–1852)
5	Alphonse Henri, comte d'Hautpoul (1789–1865)	•	31 October 1849	24 January 1851	1 year, 85 days	Party of Order	Leg. (1849)	1	Louis-Napoléon Bonaparte (1848–1852)
Position vacant (government led by Louis-Napoléon Bonaparte)		•	24 January 1851	10 April 1851	76 days	Vacant	Leg. (1849)	1	Louis-Napoléon Bonaparte (1848–1852)
6	Léon Faucher (1803–1854)	•	10 April 1851	26 October 1851	199 days	Party of Order	Leg. (1849)	1	Louis-Napoléon Bonaparte (1848–1852)
Position vacant (government led by Louis-Napoléon Bonaparte)		0	26 October 1851	2 December 1852	1 year, 37 days	Vacant	Leg. (1849)	1	Louis-Napoléon Bonaparte (1848–1852)
Position vacant (government led by Louis-Napoléon Bonaparte)		1	26 October 1851	2 December 1852	1 year, 37 days	Vacant	Leg. (1849)	1	Louis-Napoléon Bonaparte (1848–1852)
Position vacant (government led by Louis-Napoléon Bonaparte)		2	26 October 1851	2 December 1852	1 year, 37 days	Vacant	Leg. (1849)	1	Louis-Napoléon Bonaparte (1848–1852)

=== Second French Empire (1852–1870) ===
Under the constitution of the Second Republic, the President was to serve only one non-renewable term of four years. Bonaparte attempted to pass a constitutional amendment to make him eligible to run for another term, and while the amendment did receive a majority in the legislature, it was not enough to overcome the 2/3 supermajority needed. Believing he had the support of the people to continue in his policies, Bonaparte staged a self-coup on December 2, 1851. A few weeks later, the action was legitimized through a referendum that voted 92% in favor of Bonaparte remaining in office and authorizing him to draft a new constitution. The conduct of this referendum was considered to be rigged. Under the new form of government, Bonaparte was immediately reelected to a new 10 year term with no limits on reelection. About a year later, Bonaparte held another rigged referendum which voted 97% in favor of reestablishing the French Empire. Subsequently, Louis-Napoléon Bonaparte crowned himself Emperor Napoleon III, and as such was both head of state and head of government.

The legislative elections of 1869 resulted in an agreement which saw Émile Ollivier lead an independent government. While this was seen by some as a liberalization of the empire, a referendum in 1870 again showed overwhelming support for the Emperor's regime.

==== Cabinet Chiefs ====
Cabinet Chief (Lifespan)	Term of office				Faction	Legislature (Election)	Emperor (Reign)
Cabinet Chief (Lifespan)	Tenure			Duration	Faction	Legislature (Election)	Emperor (Reign)
Position vacant (absolute rule by Napoleon III)	3	2 December 1852	27 December 1869	17 years, 25 days	Vacant	I (1852)	Napoleon III (1852–1870)
Position vacant (absolute rule by Napoleon III)	3	2 December 1852	27 December 1869	17 years, 25 days	Vacant	II (1857)	Napoleon III (1852–1870)
Position vacant (absolute rule by Napoleon III)	3	2 December 1852	27 December 1869	17 years, 25 days	Vacant	III (1863)	Napoleon III (1852–1870)
Position vacant (absolute rule by Napoleon III)	4	2 December 1852	27 December 1869	17 years, 25 days	Vacant	IV (1869)	Napoleon III (1852–1870)
Émile Ollivier (1825–1913)	•	2 January 1870	9 August 1870	219 days	Bonapartist	IV (1869)	Napoleon III (1852–1870)
Charles Cousin-Montauban (1796–1878)	•	9 August 1870	4 September 1870	26 days	Independent	IV (1869)	Napoleon III (1852–1870)

== 19th century – 20th century ==
=== Third French Republic (1870–1940) ===
In 1870, Napoleon III was facing pressure to combat the growing power of Prussia which was conducting a campaign of unification. Fearing that a new unified German state would disrupt France's place as a world leader, war was declared. The Prussian army proved to be much more effective and during the Battle of Sedan Napoleon III was captured. When the news reached Paris on September 4, a crowd stormed the Palais Bourbon and proclaimed a new republic. A new Government of National Defense was formed with the intention of continuing the war against the Prussians, but Paris remained under siege for the remainder of the war. An armistice was ultimately agreed to and French forces surrendered in January 1871.

The defeated French organized a provisional government which negotiated the Treaty of Frankfurt ending the war. Post war instability and chaos, including the formation and fall of the Paris Commune, led to contentious debates about the formation of this new republic. It was even heavily considered that a third restoration of the monarchy was in order. However, disagreements continued and the organization of the provisional government became permanent with the enactment of the Constitutional Laws of 1875.

==== President of the Government of National Defense ====
President of the Government of National Defense (Lifespan)	Term of office				Faction	Legislature (Election)
President of the Government of National Defense (Lifespan)	Tenure			Duration	Faction	Legislature (Election)
Louis-Jules Trochu (1815–1896)	•	4 September 1870	22 January 1871	140 days	Military	None

==== Presidents of the Council of Ministers ====
President of the Council of Ministers (Lifespan)		Term of office				Political party or faction (Political coalition)	Legislature (Election)	President (Term)	
President of the Council of Ministers (Lifespan)		Tenure			Duration	Political party or faction (Political coalition)	Legislature (Election)	President (Term)	
7	Jules Armand Dufaure (1798–1881)	1	19 February 1871	24 May 1873	2 years, 94 days	Moderate Republicans	National Assembly (1871)	2	Adolphe Thiers (1871–1873)
7	Jules Armand Dufaure (1798–1881)	2	19 February 1871	24 May 1873	2 years, 94 days	Moderate Republicans	National Assembly (1871)	2	Adolphe Thiers (1871–1873)
8	Albert, duc de Broglie (1821–1901)	1	25 May 1873	22 May 1874	362 days	Monarchist	National Assembly (1871)	3	Patrice de MacMahon (1873–1879)
8	Albert, duc de Broglie (1821–1901)	2	25 May 1873	22 May 1874	362 days	Monarchist	National Assembly (1871)	3	Patrice de MacMahon (1873–1879)
9	Ernest Courtot de Cissey (1810–1882)	•	22 May 1874	10 March 1875	292 days	Monarchist	National Assembly (1871)	3	Patrice de MacMahon (1873–1879)
10	Louis Buffet (1818–1898)	•	10 March 1875	23 February 1876	350 days	Monarchist	National Assembly (1871)	3	Patrice de MacMahon (1873–1879)
(7)	Jules Armand Dufaure (1798–1881)	3	23 February 1876	12 December 1876	293 days	Moderate Republicans	National Assembly (1871)	3	Patrice de MacMahon (1873–1879)
(7)	Jules Armand Dufaure (1798–1881)	4	23 February 1876	12 December 1876	293 days	Moderate Republicans	National Assembly (1871)	3	Patrice de MacMahon (1873–1879)
11	Jules Simon (1814–1896)	•	12 December 1876	17 May 1877	156 days	Moderate Republicans	I (1876)	3	Patrice de MacMahon (1873–1879)
(8)	Albert, duc de Broglie (1821–1901)	3	17 May 1877	23 November 1877	190 days	Monarchist	I (1876)	3	Patrice de MacMahon (1873–1879)
12	Gaëtan de Rochebouët (1813–1899)	•	23 November 1877	13 December 1877	20 days	Monarchist	II (1877)	3	Patrice de MacMahon (1873–1879)
(7)	Jules Armand Dufaure (1798–1881)	5	13 December 1877	4 February 1879	1 year, 53 days	Moderate Republicans	II (1877)	3	Patrice de MacMahon (1873–1879)
13	William Waddington (1826–1894)	•	4 February 1879	28 December 1879	327 days	Moderate Republicans	II (1877)	4	Jules Grévy (1879–1887)
14	Charles de Freycinet (1828–1923)	1	28 December 1879	23 September 1880	270 days	Moderate Republicans	II (1877)	4	Jules Grévy (1879–1887)
15	Jules Ferry (1832–1893)	1	23 September 1880	14 November 1881	1 year, 52 days	Moderate Republicans	II (1877)	4	Jules Grévy (1879–1887)
16	Léon Gambetta (1838–1882)	•	14 November 1881	30 January 1882	77 days	Moderate Republicans	III (1881)	4	Jules Grévy (1879–1887)
(14)	Charles de Freycinet (1828–1923)	2	30 January 1882	7 August 1882	189 days	Moderate Republicans	III (1881)	4	Jules Grévy (1879–1887)
17	Charles Duclerc (1812–1888)	•	7 August 1882	29 January 1883	175 days	Moderate Republicans	III (1881)	4	Jules Grévy (1879–1887)
18	Armand Fallières (1841–1931)	•	29 January 1883	21 February 1883	23 days	Moderate Republicans	III (1881)	4	Jules Grévy (1879–1887)
(15)	Jules Ferry (1832–1893)	2	21 February 1883	6 April 1885	2 years, 44 days	Moderate Republicans	III (1881)	4	Jules Grévy (1879–1887)
19	Henri Brisson (1835–1912)	1	6 April 1885	7 January 1886	276 days	Radical Republicans	III (1881)	4	Jules Grévy (1879–1887)
(14)	Charles de Freycinet (1828–1923)	3	7 January 1886	16 December 1886	343 days	Moderate Republicans	IV (1885)	4	Jules Grévy (1879–1887)
20	René Goblet (1828–1905)	•	16 December 1886	30 May 1887	165 days	Radical Republicans	IV (1885)	4	Jules Grévy (1879–1887)
21	Maurice Rouvier (1842–1911)	1	30 May 1887	12 December 1887	196 days	Moderate Republicans	IV (1885)	4	Jules Grévy (1879–1887)
22	Pierre Tirard (1827–1893)	1	12 December 1887	3 April 1888	113 days	Moderate Republicans	IV (1885)	5	Sadi Carnot (1887–1894)
23	Charles Floquet (1828–1896)	•	3 April 1888	22 February 1889	325 days	Moderate Republicans	IV (1885)	5	Sadi Carnot (1887–1894)
(22)	Pierre Tirard (1827–1893)	2	22 February 1889	17 March 1890	1 year, 23 days	Moderate Republicans	IV (1885)	5	Sadi Carnot (1887–1894)
(14)	Charles de Freycinet (1828–1923)	4	17 March 1890	27 February 1892	1 year, 347 days	Moderate Republicans	V (1889)	5	Sadi Carnot (1887–1894)
24	Émile Loubet (1838–1929)	•	27 February 1892	6 December 1892	283 days	Moderate Republicans	V (1889)	5	Sadi Carnot (1887–1894)
25	Alexandre Ribot (1842–1923)	1	6 December 1892	4 April 1893	119 days	Moderate Republicans	V (1889)	5	Sadi Carnot (1887–1894)
25	Alexandre Ribot (1842–1923)	2	6 December 1892	4 April 1893	119 days	Moderate Republicans	V (1889)	5	Sadi Carnot (1887–1894)
26	Charles Dupuy (1851–1923)	1	4 April 1893	3 December 1893	243 days	Moderate Republicans	V (1889)	5	Sadi Carnot (1887–1894)
27	Jean Casimir-Perier (1847–1907)	•	3 December 1893	30 May 1894	178 days	Moderate Republicans	VI (1893)	5	Sadi Carnot (1887–1894)
(26)	Charles Dupuy (1851–1923)	2	30 May 1894	26 January 1895	241 days	Moderate Republicans	VI (1893)	5	Sadi Carnot (1887–1894)
(26)	Charles Dupuy (1851–1923)	3	30 May 1894	26 January 1895	241 days	Moderate Republicans	VI (1893)	6	Jean Casimir-Perier (1894–1895)
(25)	Alexandre Ribot (1842–1923)	3	26 January 1895	1 November 1895	279 days	Moderate Republicans	VI (1893)	7	Félix Faure (1895–1899)
28	Léon Bourgeois (1851–1925)	•	1 November 1895	29 April 1896	180 days	Radical Republicans	VI (1893)	7	Félix Faure (1895–1899)
29	Jules Méline (1838–1925)	•	29 April 1896	28 June 1898	2 years, 60 days	Moderate Republicans	VI (1893)	7	Félix Faure (1895–1899)
(17)	Henri Brisson (1835–1912)	2	28 June 1898	1 November 1898	126 days	Radical Republicans	VII (1898)	7	Félix Faure (1895–1899)
(26)	Charles Dupuy (1851–1923)	4	1 November 1898	22 June 1899	233 days	Moderate Republicans	VII (1898)	7	Félix Faure (1895–1899)
(26)	Charles Dupuy (1851–1923)	5	1 November 1898	22 June 1899	233 days	Moderate Republicans	VII (1898)		Émile Loubet (1899–1906)
30	Pierre Waldeck-Rousseau (1846–1904)	•	22 June 1899	7 June 1902	2 years, 350 days	Moderate Republicans	VII (1898)	8	Émile Loubet (1899–1906)
31	Émile Combes (1835–1921)	•	7 June 1902	24 January 1905	2 years, 231 days	Radical-Socialist Party (Bloc des gauches)	VIII (1902)	8	Émile Loubet (1899–1906)
(21)	Maurice Rouvier (1842–1911)	2	24 January 1905	12 March 1906	1 year, 47 days	Democratic Republican Alliance	VIII (1902)	8	Émile Loubet (1899–1906)
(21)	Maurice Rouvier (1842–1911)	3	24 January 1905	12 March 1906	1 year, 47 days	Democratic Republican Alliance	VIII (1902)	9	Armand Fallières (1906–1913)
32	Ferdinand Sarrien (1840–1915)	•	12 March 1906	25 October 1906	227 days	Radical-Socialist Party	VIII (1902)	9	Armand Fallières (1906–1913)
33	Georges Clemenceau (1841–1929)	1	25 October 1906	24 July 1909	2 years, 272 days	Independent	IX (1906)	9	Armand Fallières (1906–1913)
34	Aristide Briand (1862–1932)	1	24 July 1909	2 March 1911	1 year, 221 days	Republican-Socialist Party	IX (1906)	9	Armand Fallières (1906–1913)
34	Aristide Briand (1862–1932)	2	24 July 1909	2 March 1911	1 year, 221 days	Republican-Socialist Party	IX (1906)	9	Armand Fallières (1906–1913)
35	Ernest Monis (1846–1929)	•	2 March 1911	27 June 1911	117 days	Radical-Socialist Party	X (1910)	9	Armand Fallières (1906–1913)
36	Joseph Caillaux (1863–1944)	•	27 June 1911	21 January 1912	208 days	Radical-Socialist Party	X (1910)	9	Armand Fallières (1906–1913)
37	Raymond Poincaré (1860–1934)	1	21 January 1912	21 January 1913	1 year	Republican Democratic Party	X (1910)	9	Armand Fallières (1906–1913)
(34)	Aristide Briand (1862–1932)	3	21 January 1913	22 March 1913	60 days	Republican-Socialist Party	X (1910)	9	Armand Fallières (1906–1913)
(34)	Aristide Briand (1862–1932)	4	21 January 1913	22 March 1913	60 days	Republican-Socialist Party	X (1910)	10	Raymond Poincaré (1913–1920)
38	Louis Barthou (1862–1934)	•	22 March 1913	9 December 1913	262 days	Republican Democratic Party	X (1910)	10	Raymond Poincaré (1913–1920)
39	Gaston Doumergue (1863–1937)	1	9 December 1913	9 June 1914	182 days	Radical-Socialist Party	X (1910)	10	Raymond Poincaré (1913–1920)
(25)	Alexandre Ribot (1842–1923)	4	9 June 1914	13 June 1914	4 days	Republican Federation	XI (1914)	10	Raymond Poincaré (1913–1920)
40	René Viviani (1863–1925)	1	13 June 1914	29 October 1915	1 year, 138 days	Republican-Socialist Party	XI (1914)	10	Raymond Poincaré (1913–1920)
40	René Viviani (1863–1925)	2	13 June 1914	29 October 1915	1 year, 138 days	Republican-Socialist Party	XI (1914)	10	Raymond Poincaré (1913–1920)
(34)	Aristide Briand (1862–1932)	5	29 October 1915	20 March 1917	1 year, 142 days	Republican-Socialist Party	XI (1914)	10	Raymond Poincaré (1913–1920)
(34)	Aristide Briand (1862–1932)	6	29 October 1915	20 March 1917	1 year, 142 days	Republican-Socialist Party	XI (1914)	10	Raymond Poincaré (1913–1920)
(25)	Alexandre Ribot (1842–1923)	5	20 March 1917	12 September 1917	176 days	Republican Federation	XI (1914)	10	Raymond Poincaré (1913–1920)
41	Paul Painlevé (1863–1933)	1	12 September 1917	16 November 1917	65 days	Republican-Socialist Party	XI (1914)	10	Raymond Poincaré (1913–1920)
(33)	Georges Clemenceau (1841–1929)	2	16 November 1917	20 January 1920	2 years, 65 days	Independent	XI (1914)	10	Raymond Poincaré (1913–1920)
42	Alexandre Millerand (1859–1943)	1	20 January 1920	24 September 1920	248 days	Independent (National Bloc)	XII (1919)	10	Raymond Poincaré (1913–1920)
42	Alexandre Millerand (1859–1943)	2	20 January 1920	24 September 1920	248 days	Independent (National Bloc)	XII (1919)	11	Paul Deschanel (1920)
43	Georges Leygues (1857–1933)	•	24 September 1920	16 January 1921	114 days	Republican, Democratic and Social Party (National Bloc)	XII (1919)	12	Alexandre Millerand (1920–1924)
(34)	Aristide Briand (1862–1932)	7	16 January 1921	15 January 1922	364 days	Republican-Socialist Party	XII (1919)	12	Alexandre Millerand (1920–1924)
(37)	Raymond Poincaré (1860–1934)	2	15 January 1922	8 June 1924	2 years, 145 days	Republican, Democratic and Social Party (National Bloc)	XII (1919)	12	Alexandre Millerand (1920–1924)
(37)	Raymond Poincaré (1860–1934)	3	15 January 1922	8 June 1924	2 years, 145 days	Republican, Democratic and Social Party (National Bloc)	XII (1919)	12	Alexandre Millerand (1920–1924)
44	Frédéric François-Marsal (1874–1958)	•	8 June 1924	15 June 1924	7 days	Republican Federation (National Bloc)	XIII (1924)	12	Alexandre Millerand (1920–1924)
45	Édouard Herriot (1872–1957)	1	15 June 1924	17 April 1925	306 days	Radical-Socialist Party (Cartel des Gauches)	XIII (1924)	13	Gaston Doumergue (1924–1931)
(41)	Paul Painlevé (1863–1933)	2	17 April 1925	28 November 1925	225 days	Republican-Socialist Party (Cartel des Gauches)	XIII (1924)	13	Gaston Doumergue (1924–1931)
(41)	Paul Painlevé (1863–1933)	3	17 April 1925	28 November 1925	225 days	Republican-Socialist Party (Cartel des Gauches)	XIII (1924)	13	Gaston Doumergue (1924–1931)
(34)	Aristide Briand (1862–1932)	8	28 November 1925	20 July 1926	234 days	Republican-Socialist Party (Cartel des Gauches)	XIII (1924)	13	Gaston Doumergue (1924–1931)
(34)	Aristide Briand (1862–1932)	9	28 November 1925	20 July 1926	234 days	Republican-Socialist Party (Cartel des Gauches)	XIII (1924)	13	Gaston Doumergue (1924–1931)
(34)	Aristide Briand (1862–1932)	10	28 November 1925	20 July 1926	234 days	Republican-Socialist Party (Cartel des Gauches)	XIII (1924)	13	Gaston Doumergue (1924–1931)
(45)	Édouard Herriot (1872–1957)	2	20 July 1926	23 July 1926	3 days	Radical-Socialist Party (Cartel des Gauches)	XIII (1924)	13	Gaston Doumergue (1924–1931)
(37)	Raymond Poincaré (1860–1934)	4	23 July 1926	29 July 1929	3 years, 6 days	Democratic Alliance (National Union)	XIII (1924)	13	Gaston Doumergue (1924–1931)
(37)	Raymond Poincaré (1860–1934)	5	23 July 1926	29 July 1929	3 years, 6 days	Democratic Alliance (National Union)	XIII (1924)	13	Gaston Doumergue (1924–1931)
(34)	Aristide Briand (1862–1932)	11	29 July 1929	2 November 1929	96 days	Republican-Socialist Party	XIV (1928)	13	Gaston Doumergue (1924–1931)
46	André Tardieu (1876–1945)	1	2 November 1929	21 February 1930	111 days	Democratic Alliance	XIV (1928)	13	Gaston Doumergue (1924–1931)
47	Camille Chautemps (1885–1963)	1	21 February 1930	2 March 1930	9 days	Radical-Socialist Party	XIV (1928)	13	Gaston Doumergue (1924–1931)
(46)	André Tardieu (1876–1945)	2	2 March 1930	13 December 1930	286 days	Democratic Alliance	XIV (1928)	13	Gaston Doumergue (1924–1931)
48	Théodore Steeg (1868–1950)	•	13 December 1930	27 January 1931	45 days	Radical-Socialist Party	XIV (1928)	13	Gaston Doumergue (1924–1931)
49	Pierre Laval (1883–1945)	1	27 January 1931	20 February 1932	1 year, 24 days	Independent	XIV (1928)	13	Gaston Doumergue (1924–1931)
49	Pierre Laval (1883–1945)	2	27 January 1931	20 February 1932	1 year, 24 days	Independent	XIV (1928)	14	Paul Doumer (1931–1932)
49	Pierre Laval (1883–1945)	3	27 January 1931	20 February 1932	1 year, 24 days	Independent	XIV (1928)	14	Paul Doumer (1931–1932)
(46)	André Tardieu (1876–1945)	3	20 February 1932	3 June 1932	104 days	Democratic Alliance	XIV (1928)	14	Paul Doumer (1931–1932)
(45)	Édouard Herriot (1872–1957)	3	3 June 1932	18 December 1932	198 days	Radical-Socialist Party (Cartel des Gauches)	XV (1932)	15	Albert Lebrun (1932–1940)
50	Joseph Paul-Boncour (1873–1972)	•	18 December 1932	31 January 1933	44 days	Republican-Socialist Party (Cartel des Gauches)	XV (1932)	15	Albert Lebrun (1932–1940)
51	Édouard Daladier (1884–1970)	1	31 January 1933	26 October 1933	268 days	Radical-Socialist Party (Cartel des Gauches)	XV (1932)	15	Albert Lebrun (1932–1940)
52	Albert Sarraut (1872–1962)	1	26 October 1933	26 November 1933	31 days	Radical-Socialist Party (Cartel des Gauches)	XV (1932)	15	Albert Lebrun (1932–1940)
(47)	Camille Chautemps (1885–1963)	2	26 November 1933	30 January 1934	65 days	Radical-Socialist Party (Cartel des Gauches)	XV (1932)	15	Albert Lebrun (1932–1940)
(51)	Édouard Daladier (1884–1970)	2	30 January 1934	9 February 1934	10 days	Radical-Socialist Party (Cartel des Gauches)	XV (1932)	15	Albert Lebrun (1932–1940)
(39)	Gaston Doumergue (1863–1937)	2	9 February 1934	8 November 1934	272 days	Radical-Socialist Party	XV (1932)	15	Albert Lebrun (1932–1940)
53	Pierre-Étienne Flandin (1889–1958)	1	8 November 1934	1 June 1935	205 days	Democratic Alliance	XV (1932)	15	Albert Lebrun (1932–1940)
54	Fernand Bouisson (1874–1959)	•	1 June 1935	7 June 1935	6 days	Independent	XV (1932)	15	Albert Lebrun (1932–1940)
(49)	Pierre Laval (1883–1945)	4	7 June 1935	24 January 1936	231 days	Independent	XV (1932)	15	Albert Lebrun (1932–1940)
(52)	Albert Sarraut (1872–1962)	2	24 January 1936	4 June 1936	132 days	Radical-Socialist Party	XV (1932)	15	Albert Lebrun (1932–1940)
55	Léon Blum (1872–1950)	1	4 June 1936	22 June 1937	1 year, 18 days	French Section of the Workers' International (Popular Front)	XVI (1936)	15	Albert Lebrun (1932–1940)
(47)	Camille Chautemps (1885–1963)	3	22 June 1937	13 March 1938	264 days	Radical-Socialist Party (Popular Front)	XVI (1936)	15	Albert Lebrun (1932–1940)
(47)	Camille Chautemps (1885–1963)	4	22 June 1937	13 March 1938	264 days	Radical-Socialist Party (Popular Front)	XVI (1936)	15	Albert Lebrun (1932–1940)
(55)	Léon Blum (1872–1950)	2	13 March 1938	10 April 1938	28 days	French Section of the Workers' International (Popular Front)	XVI (1936)	15	Albert Lebrun (1932–1940)
(51)	Édouard Daladier (1884–1970)	3	10 April 1938	21 March 1940	1 year, 346 days	Radical-Socialist Party	XVI (1936)	15	Albert Lebrun (1932–1940)
(51)	Édouard Daladier (1884–1970)	4	10 April 1938	21 March 1940	1 year, 346 days	Radical-Socialist Party	XVI (1936)	15	Albert Lebrun (1932–1940)
(51)	Édouard Daladier (1884–1970)	5	10 April 1938	21 March 1940	1 year, 346 days	Radical-Socialist Party	XVI (1936)	15	Albert Lebrun (1932–1940)
56	Paul Reynaud (1878–1966)	•	21 March 1940	16 June 1940	87 days	Democratic Alliance	XVI (1936)	15	Albert Lebrun (1932–1940)
57	Philippe Pétain (1856–1951)	•	16 June 1940	11 July 1940	25 days	Independent	XVI (1936)	15	Albert Lebrun (1932–1940)

=== French State (1940–1944) ===
Following the success of the German military in the Battle of France, the government under Marshal Philippe Pétain signed the Second Armistice at Compiègne. The armistice transferred the northern territory of the nation into a zone occupied by the German army, while the southern portion of the country would remain a Zone libre. Those opposed to the armistice, led by Charles de Gaulle, continued the war effort abroad and formed a government in exile. On 10 July 1940, the French parliament voted to give full powers to Pétain who days later proclaimed the État Français (the "French State"), commonly known as "Vichy France" due to its location. Pétain served as Chief of State and nominal President of the Council of Ministers, until 1942. From 1942, Pétain remained Chief of State, but Pierre Laval was named Chief of the Government.

When the war concluded, de Gaulle explicitly refused to declare a new republic, insisting that the Third Republic had never ceased to exist. The Ordinance of 9 August 1944 declared the Vichy government unconstitutional, and as such any actions taken by them were null and void.

==== Vice-Presidents of the Council of Ministers ====
Vice-president of the Council of Ministers (Lifespan)		Term of office				Faction	Legislature (Election)	Head of State (Term)
Vice-president of the Council of Ministers (Lifespan)		Tenure			Duration	Faction	Legislature (Election)	Head of State (Term)
(49)	Pierre Laval (1883–1945)	5	11 July 1940	13 December 1940	155 days	National Revolution	None	Philippe Pétain (1940–1944)
(53)	Pierre-Étienne Flandin (1889–1958)	2	13 December 1940	9 February 1941	58 days	National Revolution	None	Philippe Pétain (1940–1944)
58	François Darlan (1881–1942)	•	9 February 1941	18 April 1942	1 year, 68 days	National Revolution	None	Philippe Pétain (1940–1944)

==== Chief of the Government ====
Chief of the Government (Lifespan)		Term of office				Faction	Legislature (Election)	Head of State (Term)
Chief of the Government (Lifespan)		Tenure			Duration	Faction	Legislature (Election)	Head of State (Term)
(49)	Pierre Laval (1883–1945)	6	18 April 1942	19 August 1944	2 years, 123 days	National Revolution	None	Philippe Pétain (1940–1944)

=== Provisional Government of the French Republic (1944–1946) ===
A Provisional Government of the French Republic was set up by the Free France resistance leadership on June 3, 1944 in the leadup to the Allies' invasion of Normandy. The primary goals of this government were to oversee the war effort and secure French national sovereignty following the war and prevent allied military administration. Following the war, a constitutional referendum showed overwhelming support for reorganizing the government in a constituent assembly.

==== Chairmen of the Provisional Government ====
Chairman of the Provisional Government (Lifespan)		Term of office				Political party (Political coalition)	Legislature (Election)
Chairman of the Provisional Government (Lifespan)		Tenure			Duration	Political party (Political coalition)	Legislature (Election)
59	Charles de Gaulle (1890–1970)	1	3 June 1944	26 January 1946	1 year, 237 days	Independent	Provisional
59	Charles de Gaulle (1890–1970)	2	3 June 1944	26 January 1946	1 year, 237 days	Independent	I (1945)
60	Félix Gouin (1884–1977)	•	26 January 1946	24 June 1946	149 days	French Section of the Workers' International (Tripartisme)	I (1945)
61	Georges Bidault (1899–1983)	1	24 June 1946	16 December 1946	175 days	Popular Republican Movement (Tripartisme)	II (June 1946)
–	Vincent Auriol (1884–1966) (interim)	–	28 November 1946	16 December 1946	18 days	French Section of the Workers' International (Tripartisme)	IV Rep. I (Nov 1946)
62	Léon Blum (1872–1950)	3	16 December 1946	22 January 1947	37 days	French Section of the Workers' International (Tripartisme)	IV Rep. I (Nov 1946)

=== Fourth French Republic (1946–1958) ===
A series of referendums in 1946 resulted in the adoption of a new constitution. The new constitution split executive power between a President of the Republic and a President of the Council of Ministers. This marked the first time the role of the President of the Council of Ministers was explicitly laid out in a constitution, previously the role existed merely as a convention.

==== Presidents of the Council of Ministers ====
President of the Council of Ministers (Lifespan)		Term of office				Political party (Political coalition)	Legislature (Election)	President (Term)	
President of the Council of Ministers (Lifespan)		Tenure			Duration	Political party (Political coalition)	Legislature (Election)	President (Term)	
63	Paul Ramadier (1888–1961)	1	22 January 1947	24 November 1947	306 days	French Section of the Workers' International (Tripartisme)	I (Nov.1946)	16	Vincent Auriol (1947–1954)
63	Paul Ramadier (1888–1961)	2	22 January 1947	24 November 1947	306 days	French Section of the Workers' International (Tripartisme)	I (Nov.1946)	16	Vincent Auriol (1947–1954)
64	Robert Schuman (1886–1963)	1	24 November 1947	24 July 1948	243 days	Popular Republican Movement (Third Force)	I (Nov.1946)	16	Vincent Auriol (1947–1954)
65	André Marie (1897–1974)	•	24 July 1948	2 September 1948	40 days	Radical Party (Third Force)	I (Nov.1946)	16	Vincent Auriol (1947–1954)
(64)	Robert Schuman (1886–1963)	2	2 September 1948	11 September 1948	9 days	Popular Republican Movement (Third Force)	I (Nov.1946)	16	Vincent Auriol (1947–1954)
66	Henri Queuille (1884–1970)	1	11 September 1948	28 October 1949	1 year, 47 days	Radical Party (Third Force)	I (Nov.1946)	16	Vincent Auriol (1947–1954)
(61)	Georges Bidault (1899–1983)	2	28 October 1949	2 July 1950	247 days	Popular Republican Movement (Third Force)	I (Nov.1946)	16	Vincent Auriol (1947–1954)
(61)	Georges Bidault (1899–1983)	3	28 October 1949	2 July 1950	247 days	Popular Republican Movement (Third Force)	I (Nov.1946)	16	Vincent Auriol (1947–1954)
(66)	Henri Queuille (1884–1970)	2	2 July 1950	12 July 1950	10 days	Radical Party (Third Force)	I (Nov.1946)	16	Vincent Auriol (1947–1954)
67	René Pleven (1901–1993)	1	12 July 1950	10 March 1951	241 days	Democratic and Socialist Union of the Resistance (Third Force)	I (Nov.1946)	16	Vincent Auriol (1947–1954)
(66)	Henri Queuille (1884–1970)	3	10 March 1951	11 August 1951	154 days	Radical Party (Third Force)	I (Nov.1946)	16	Vincent Auriol (1947–1954)
(67)	René Pleven (1901–1993)	2	11 August 1951	20 January 1952	162 days	Democratic and Socialist Union of the Resistance (Third Force)	II (1951)	16	Vincent Auriol (1947–1954)
68	Edgar Faure (1908–1988)	1	20 January 1952	8 March 1952	48 days	Radical Party	II (1951)	16	Vincent Auriol (1947–1954)
69	Antoine Pinay (1891–1994)	•	8 March 1952	8 January 1953	306 days	National Centre of Independents and Peasants	II (1951)	16	Vincent Auriol (1947–1954)
70	René Mayer (1895–1972)	•	8 January 1953	28 June 1953	171 days	Radical Party	II (1951)	16	Vincent Auriol (1947–1954)
71	Joseph Laniel (1889–1975)	1	28 June 1953	19 June 1954	356 days	National Centre of Independents and Peasants	II (1951)	16	Vincent Auriol (1947–1954)
71	Joseph Laniel (1889–1975)	2	28 June 1953	19 June 1954	356 days	National Centre of Independents and Peasants	II (1951)	17	René Coty (1954–1959)
72	Pierre Mendès France (1907–1982)	•	19 June 1954	17 February 1955	243 days	Radical Party	II (1951)	17	René Coty (1954–1959)
(68)	Edgar Faure (1908–1988)	2	17 February 1955	1 February 1956	349 days	Radical Party	II (1951)	17	René Coty (1954–1959)
73	Guy Mollet (1905–1975)	•	1 February 1956	13 June 1957	1 year, 132 days	French Section of the Workers' International (Republican Front)	III (1956)	17	René Coty (1954–1959)
74	Maurice Bourgès-Maunoury (1914–1993)	•	13 June 1957	6 November 1957	146 days	Radical Party (Republican Front)	III (1956)	17	René Coty (1954–1959)
75	Félix Gaillard (1919–1970)	•	6 November 1957	14 May 1958	189 days	Radical Party (Republican Front)	III (1956)	17	René Coty (1954–1959)
76	Pierre Pflimlin (1907–2000)	•	14 May 1958	1 June 1958	18 days	Popular Republican Movement	III (1956)	17	René Coty (1954–1959)
(59)	Charles de Gaulle (1890–1970)	3	1 June 1958	8 January 1959	221 days	Union for the New Republic	III (1956)	17	René Coty (1954–1959)

== 20th century – 21st century ==
=== Fifth French Republic (since 1958) ===
The Fourth Republic collapsed as the result of the Algiers Crisis of 1958. Charles de Gaulle returned from retirement and in order to prevent a civil war was granted extraordinary powers to restructure the government. The new constitution strengthened the powers of the executive, especially those of the President which had previously been mostly a ceremonial role.

==== Prime Ministers ====
S. No.	Portrait	Prime Minister (Lifespan)	Term of office			Political party (Political coalition)	Government	Legislature (Election)	President (Term)	
S. No.	Portrait	Prime Minister (Lifespan)	Term of office		Duration	Political party (Political coalition)	Government	Legislature (Election)	President (Term)	
77		Michel Debré (1912–1996)	8 January 1959	14 April 1962	3 years, 96 days	Union for the New Republic	Debré	I (1958)	18	Charles de Gaulle (1959–1969)
78		Georges Pompidou (1911–1974)	14 April 1962	7 December 1962	6 years, 87 days	Union for the New Republic	Pompidou I	I (1958)	18	Charles de Gaulle (1959–1969)
78		Georges Pompidou (1911–1974)	7 December 1962	8 January 1966	6 years, 87 days	Union for the New Republic	Pompidou II	II (1962)	18	Charles de Gaulle (1959–1969)
78		Georges Pompidou (1911–1974)	8 January 1966	7 April 1967	6 years, 87 days	Union for the New Republic	Pompidou III	II (1962)	18	Charles de Gaulle (1959–1969)
78		Georges Pompidou (1911–1974)	7 April 1967	10 July 1968	6 years, 87 days	Union for the New Republic	Pompidou IV	III (1967)	18	Charles de Gaulle (1959–1969)
79		Maurice Couve de Murville (1907–1999)	10 July 1968	20 June 1969	345 days	Union of Democrats for the Republic	Couve de Murville	IV (1968)	18	Charles de Gaulle (1959–1969)
80		Jacques Chaban-Delmas (1915–2000)	20 June 1969	5 July 1972	3 years, 15 days	Union of Democrats for the Republic	Chaban-Delmas	IV (1968)	19	Georges Pompidou (1969–1974)
81		Pierre Messmer (1916–2007)	5 July 1972	5 April 1973	1 year, 326 days	Union of Democrats for the Republic	Messmer I	IV (1968)	19	Georges Pompidou (1969–1974)
81		Pierre Messmer (1916–2007)	5 April 1973	1 March 1974	1 year, 326 days	Union of Democrats for the Republic	Messmer II	V (1973)	19	Georges Pompidou (1969–1974)
81		Pierre Messmer (1916–2007)	1 March 1974	27 May 1974	1 year, 326 days	Union of Democrats for the Republic	Messmer III	V (1973)	19	Georges Pompidou (1969–1974)
82		Jacques Chirac (1932–2019)	27 May 1974	25 August 1976	2 years, 90 days	Union of Democrats for the Republic	Chirac I	V (1973)	20	Valéry Giscard d'Estaing (1974–1981)
83		Raymond Barre (1924–2007)	25 August 1976	30 March 1977	4 years, 269 days	Miscellaneous right (Union for French Democracy)	Barre I	V (1973)	20	Valéry Giscard d'Estaing (1974–1981)
83		Raymond Barre (1924–2007)	30 March 1977	5 April 1978	4 years, 269 days	Miscellaneous right (Union for French Democracy)	Barre II	V (1973)	20	Valéry Giscard d'Estaing (1974–1981)
83		Raymond Barre (1924–2007)	5 April 1978	21 May 1981	4 years, 269 days	Miscellaneous right (Union for French Democracy)	Barre III	VI (1978)	20	Valéry Giscard d'Estaing (1974–1981)
84		Pierre Mauroy (1928–2013)	21 May 1981	23 June 1981	3 years, 57 days	Socialist Party	Mauroy I	VI (1978)	21	François Mitterrand (1981–1995)
84		Pierre Mauroy (1928–2013)	23 June 1981	22 March 1983	3 years, 57 days	Socialist Party	Mauroy II	VII (1981)	21	François Mitterrand (1981–1995)
84		Pierre Mauroy (1928–2013)	22 March 1983	17 July 1984	3 years, 57 days	Socialist Party	Mauroy III	VII (1981)	21	François Mitterrand (1981–1995)
85		Laurent Fabius (b. 1946)	17 July 1984	20 March 1986	1 year, 246 days	Socialist Party	Fabius	VII (1981)	21	François Mitterrand (1981–1995)
(82)		Jacques Chirac (1932–2019)	20 March 1986	10 May 1988	2 years, 51 days	Rally for the Republic	Chirac II	VIII (1986)	21	François Mitterrand (1981–1995)
86		Michel Rocard (1930–2016)	10 May 1988	28 June 1988	3 years, 5 days	Socialist Party	Rocard I	VIII (1986)	21	François Mitterrand (1981–1995)
86		Michel Rocard (1930–2016)	28 June 1988	15 May 1991	3 years, 5 days	Socialist Party	Rocard II	IX (1988)	21	François Mitterrand (1981–1995)
87		Édith Cresson (b. 1934)	15 May 1991	2 April 1992	323 days	Socialist Party	Cresson	IX (1988)	21	François Mitterrand (1981–1995)
88		Pierre Bérégovoy (1925–1993)	2 April 1992	29 March 1993	361 days	Socialist Party	Bérégovoy	IX (1988)	21	François Mitterrand (1981–1995)
89		Édouard Balladur (1929–2026)	29 March 1993	17 May 1995	2 years, 49 days	Rally for the Republic	Balladur	X (1993)	21	François Mitterrand (1981–1995)
90		Alain Juppé (b. 1945)	17 May 1995	7 November 1995	2 years, 16 days	Rally for the Republic	Juppé I	X (1993)	22	Jacques Chirac (1995–2007)
90		Alain Juppé (b. 1945)	7 November 1995	2 June 1997	2 years, 16 days	Rally for the Republic	Juppé II	X (1993)	22	Jacques Chirac (1995–2007)
91		Lionel Jospin (1937–2026)	2 June 1997	6 May 2002	4 years, 338 days	Socialist Party	Jospin	XI (1997)	22	Jacques Chirac (1995–2007)
92		Jean-Pierre Raffarin (b. 1948)	6 May 2002	17 June 2002	3 years, 25 days	Liberal Democracy, later Union for a Popular Movement	Raffarin I	XI (1997)	22	Jacques Chirac (1995–2007)
92		Jean-Pierre Raffarin (b. 1948)	17 June 2002	31 March 2004	3 years, 25 days	Liberal Democracy, later Union for a Popular Movement	Raffarin II	XII (2002)	22	Jacques Chirac (1995–2007)
92		Jean-Pierre Raffarin (b. 1948)	31 March 2004	31 May 2005	3 years, 25 days	Liberal Democracy, later Union for a Popular Movement	Raffarin III	XII (2002)	22	Jacques Chirac (1995–2007)
93		Dominique de Villepin (b. 1953)	31 May 2005	17 May 2007	1 year, 351 days	Union for a Popular Movement	Villepin	XII (2002)	22	Jacques Chirac (1995–2007)
94		François Fillon (b. 1954)	17 May 2007	19 June 2007	4 years, 364 days	Union for a Popular Movement	Fillon I	XII (2002)	23	Nicolas Sarkozy (2007–2012)
94		François Fillon (b. 1954)	19 June 2007	14 November 2010	4 years, 364 days	Union for a Popular Movement	Fillon II	XIII (2007)	23	Nicolas Sarkozy (2007–2012)
94		François Fillon (b. 1954)	14 November 2010	15 May 2012	4 years, 364 days	Union for a Popular Movement	Fillon III	XIII (2007)	23	Nicolas Sarkozy (2007–2012)
95		Jean-Marc Ayrault (b. 1950)	15 May 2012	21 June 2012	1 year, 320 days	Socialist Party	Ayrault I	XIII (2007)	24	François Hollande (2012–2017)
95		Jean-Marc Ayrault (b. 1950)	21 June 2012	31 March 2014	1 year, 320 days	Socialist Party	Ayrault II	XIV (2012)	24	François Hollande (2012–2017)
96		Manuel Valls (b. 1962)	31 March 2014	26 August 2014	2 years, 250 days	Socialist Party	Valls I	XIV (2012)	24	François Hollande (2012–2017)
96		Manuel Valls (b. 1962)	26 August 2014	6 December 2016	2 years, 250 days	Socialist Party	Valls II	XIV (2012)	24	François Hollande (2012–2017)
97		Bernard Cazeneuve (b. 1963)	6 December 2016	15 May 2017	160 days	Socialist Party	Cazeneuve	XIV (2012)	24	François Hollande (2012–2017)
98		Édouard Philippe (b. 1970)	15 May 2017	21 June 2017	3 years, 49 days	The Republicans, later Independent	Philippe I	XIV (2012)	25	Emmanuel Macron (2017–present)
98		Édouard Philippe (b. 1970)	21 June 2017	3 July 2020	3 years, 49 days	The Republicans, later Independent	Philippe II	XV (2017)	25	Emmanuel Macron (2017–present)
99		Jean Castex (b. 1965)	3 July 2020	16 May 2022	1 year, 317 days	Independent	Castex	XV (2017)	25	Emmanuel Macron (2017–present)
100		Élisabeth Borne (b. 1961)	16 May 2022	4 July 2022	1 year, 238 days	Renaissance (Note: Renamed from La République En Marche! in September 2022)	Borne I	XV (2017)	25	Emmanuel Macron (2017–present)
100		Élisabeth Borne (b. 1961)	4 July 2022	9 January 2024	1 year, 238 days	Renaissance	Borne II	XVI (2022)	25	Emmanuel Macron (2017–present)
101		Gabriel Attal (b. 1989)	9 January 2024	5 September 2024	240 days	Renaissance	Attal	XVI (2022)	25	Emmanuel Macron (2017–present)
102		Michel Barnier (b. 1951)	5 September 2024	13 December 2024	99 days	The Republicans	Barnier	XVII (2024)	25	Emmanuel Macron (2017–present)
103		François Bayrou (b. 1951)	13 December 2024	9 September 2025	270 days	Democratic Movement	Bayrou	XVII (2024)	25	Emmanuel Macron (2017–present)
104		Sébastien Lecornu (b. 1986)	9 September 2025	6 October 2025 (Note: Resigned on 6 October 2025 after just 26 days in office, making his tenure as prime minister the shortest in the history of the French Fifth Republic. After four days of Lecornu in caretaker capacity, Macron reappointed him as Prime Minister on a permanent basis on 10 October.)	27 days	Renaissance	Lecornu I	XVII (2024)	25	Emmanuel Macron (2017–present)
104		Sébastien Lecornu (b. 1986)	10 October 2025	Incumbent	325 days	Renaissance	Lecornu II	XVII (2024)	25	Emmanuel Macron (2017–present)

== See also ==
- History of France
- Politics of France
- President of France
  - List of presidents of France
- Ministry for Europe and Foreign Affairs – Foreign affairs government office of France
