= First cabinet of Odilon Barrot =

French cabinet from 1848–1849

- France; Cabinet of France
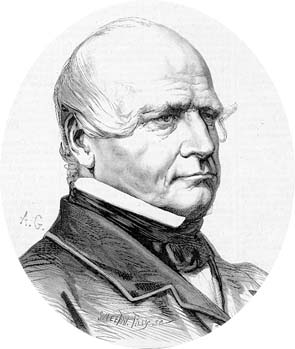
- Odilon Barrot
- Date formed: 20 December 1848
- Date dissolved: 2 June 1849

People and organisations
- Head of state: Louis Napoleon
- Head of government: Odilon Barrot

History
- Predecessor: Cabinet of General Cavaignac
- Successor: Second cabinet of Odilon Barrot

The first cabinet of Odilon Barrot was the government of France from 20 December 1848 to 2 June 1849 under President of the Council Odilon Barrot. It was formed after the election of Louis Napoleon as President on 20 December 1848, the day that he took his oath. It replaced the cabinet of General Cavaignac. After the May 1849 elections to the Legislative Assembly it was replaced by the second cabinet of Odilon Barrot.

== Ministers ==
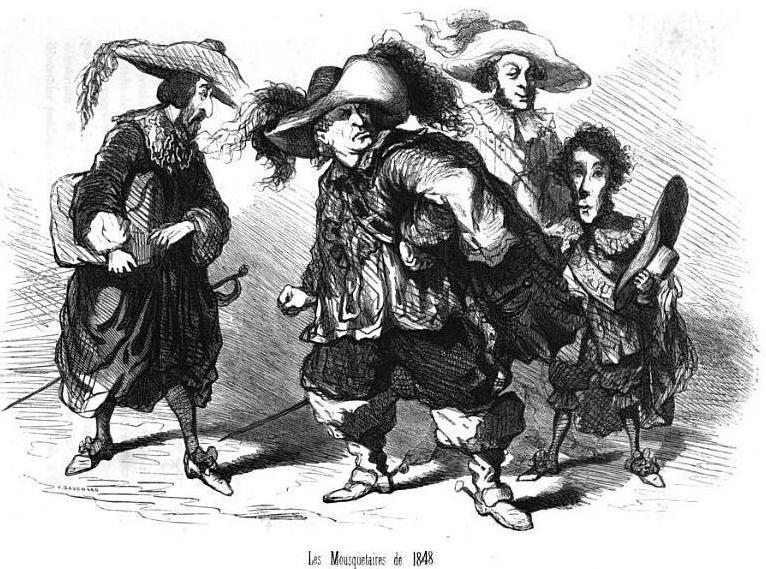
The ministers as Dumas's musketeers by Cham. Left to right Falloux as Aramis, Barrot as Athos, Buffet as Porthos and Faucher as d'Artagnan

The ministers were:

Portfolio	Holder	Party
President of the Council of Ministers	Odilon Barrot	Party of Order
Minister of Foreign Affairs	Édouard Drouyn de Lhuys	Party of Order
Minister of the Interior	Léon de Maleville	Party of Order
Minister of Justice	Odilon Barrot	Party of Order
Minister of Finance	Hippolyte Passy	Party of Order
Minister of Public Works	Léon Faucher	Party of Order
Minister of Trade and Agriculture	Jacques Alexandre Bixio	Moderate Republican
Minister of Education	Alfred de Falloux	Party of Order
Minister of War	Joseph Marcellin Rullière	Military
Minister of the Navy and Colonies	Victor Destutt de Tracy	Party of Order

Changes

- On 29 December 1848, Léon Faucher substituted Léon de Maleville as Interior Minister; Théobald de Lacrosse substituted Faucher as Public Works Minister; Louis Buffet substituted Jacques Alexandre Bixio as Agriculture Minister.

== Sources ==
- Augello, Massimo M.; Guidi, Marco Enrico Luigi (2005-01-01). Economists in Parliament in the Liberal Age (1848-1920). Ashgate Publishing, Ltd. ISBN 978-0-7546-3965-7.
- "Ministére du 2 juin 1849". Table analytique par ordre alphabétique de matières et de noms de personnes du Compte rendu des séances de l'Assemblée nationale législative et des documents imprimés par son ordre: 28 mai 1849 - 2 déc. 1851. H. et C. Noblet. 1852.
- Muel, Léon (1890). Gouvernements, ministères et constitutions de la France depuis cent ans. Mouillot.
- Robertson, Priscilla Smith (1952). Revolutions of 1848: A Social History. Princeton University Press. p. 102. ISBN 0-691-00756-X.
