= Second cabinet of Odilon Barrot =

French cabinet of 1849

- France; Cabinet of France
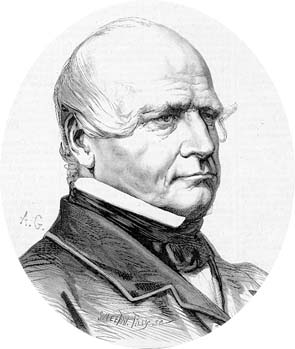
- Odilon Barrot
- Date formed: 2 June 1849
- Date dissolved: 31 October 1849

People and organisations
- Head of state: Louis Napoleon
- Head of government: Odilon Barrot

History
- Predecessor: First cabinet of Odilon Barrot
- Successor: Cabinet of Alphonse Henri d'Hautpoul

The second cabinet of Odilon Barrot was the government of France from 2 June 1849 to 31 October 1849 under President of the Council Odilon Barrot. It followed the first cabinet of Odilon Barrot, dissolved before the elections to the Legislative Assembly, and was constituted by President Louis Napoleon. It was dismissed on 31 October 1849 and replaced by the cabinet of Alphonse Henri d'Hautpoul.

== Ministers ==
The ministers were:

Portfolio	Holder	Party
President of the Council of Ministers	Odilon Barrot	Party of Order
Minister of Foreign Affairs	Alexis de Tocqueville	Party of Order
Minister of the Interior	Jules Dufaure	Moderate Republican
Minister of Justice	Odilon Barrot	Party of Order
Minister of Finance	Hippolyte Passy	Party of Order
Minister of Public Works	Théobald de Lacrosse	Party of Order
Minister of Trade and Agriculture	Victor Lanjuinais	Party of Order
Minister of Education	Alfred de Falloux	Party of Order
Minister of War	Joseph Marcellin Rullière	Military
Minister of the Navy and Colonies	Victor Destutt de Tracy	Party of Order

== Sources ==
- "Ministére du 2 juin 1849". Table analytique par ordre alphabétique de matières et de noms de personnes du Compte rendu des séances de l'Assemblée nationale législative et des documents imprimés par son ordre: 28 mai 1849 - 2 déc. 1851. H. et C. Noblet. 1852.
