= Charles Le Bègue de Germiny =

French financier and politician

Charles Gabriel Le Bègue de Germiny
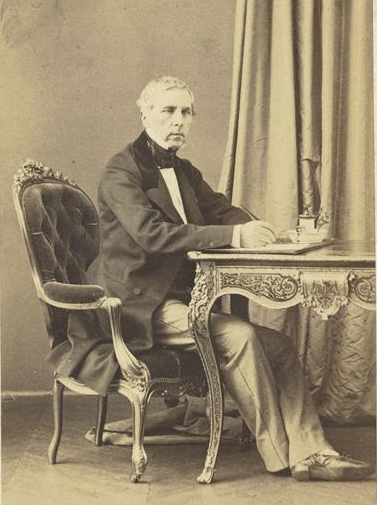
- Charles Le Bègue de Germiny
- Born: 3 November 1799; Cliponville, Seine-Maritime, France
- Died: 22 February 1871 (aged 71); Yvetot, Seine-Maritime, France
- Occupations: Financier, politician
- Known for: Minister of Finance; Governor of the Banque de France

Charles Gabriel Le Bègue de Germiny (3 November 1799 – 22 February 1871) was a French financier and politician. He was Minister of Finance during the French Second Republic, and governor of the Banque de France.

== Early years ==
Charles Gabriel Le Bègue, Count of Germiny was born on 3 November 1799 (12 Brumaire Year viii) in Cliponville, Seine-Maritime. His father and his father-in-law, Jean-Georges Humann, were peers of France. Humann was associated with him in founding the Société des houillères et fonderies de l’Aveyron (Aveyron colliery and foundry) in June 1826, with Germiny as president. After this he was involved in many companies including the Fonderies et forges d’Alais (Alais foundry and forge), the Paris-Orléans railway and the Nationale, a fire and life insurance company (from 1851).

Germiny pursued a career with the administration in parallel. In 1832 he joined the Conseil d'État (Council of State) and was named maître des requêtes. In 1833 he became Receiver General of Finances of Saône-et-Loire and then of Seine Inférieure. In 1838 he was appointed Prefect of Seine-et-Marne. He left his post in the Conseil d'État in 1840 to become chief of staff to his father-in-law, Jean-Georges Humann, who had been appointed Minister of Finance. In 1841 Germiny was appointed master counselor to the Court of Accounts. He helped in the creation of the Comptoir national d'escompte de Paris and of several credit institutions. He was appointed a Regent of the Banque de France on 31 January 1850.

== Minister of Finance ==
Le Bègue de Germiny was Minister of Finance from 24 January 1851 to 10 April 1851. He held this office in the transitional government called the Petit ministère (small ministry) or ministère sans nom (no-name ministry) that ran the government for two and a half months during a period of growing tension between the President and the Assembly, with a weak economy. He presented a request for a large increase in the President's personal budget, but the Assembly would not authorize it, forcing the President to cut back his expenses.

Germiny presented and defended the budget for 1852, which had been prepared by his predecessor, Achille Fould. The 10 million budget surplus was more than offset by 75 million planned for special projects. Public debt now stood at 647 million, which Germiny hoped to reduce to 616 million by the end of 1851. The budget raised a storm of controversy in the Assembly, with some looking for savings in expenditure and a few looking for an increase in the salt tax. It had not been approved by 10 April 1851, when the ministry resigned and was replaced by the Cabinet of Léon Faucher. Germiny did succeed in obtaining approval to cover costs of the 1834 loan to Greece, and filed a bill that was later approved for contracting postal service in the Mediterranean.

== Crédit Foncier and Banque de France ==
On the day after his dismissal from the cabinet Le Bègue de Germiny was named commander of the Legion of Honor. He returned to his posts of Receiver-General of the Seine Inférieure and Regent of the Banque de France, holding this office until July 1854. In 1854 Germiny was elected representative of Yerville in the general council of the Seine Inférieure, and soon became vice president of the council.

On 6 July 1854 Le Bègue de Germiny was appointed governor of Crédit Foncier de France (Land Bank of France). This was formed by merging three banks that had been founded in Paris, Nevers and Marseille in 1852 to provide mortgages to finance agricultural activity. Crédit Foncier was supported by the state and had a monopoly throughout France. Because of difficulty in placing securities, the bank was forced to accept public guardianship. Germiny took advantage of the resulting confidence in the bank to issue large amounts of debt secured by the mortgages. He also favored forming an agricultural bank associated with the Crédit Foncier, but this was not successful. The bank gradually moved away from its rural roots and became mainly involved in urban real estate, particularly in Paris.

On 10 June 1857 Germiny was named Governor of the Banque de France (Bank of France). Under Germiny the central bank was restructured and its capital doubled. With much greater stability, the bank could play a key role in the control of credit, similar to that of the Bank of England. Germiny often used changes to the discount rate to protect the value of the notes the bank issued. The bank also played a discreet role in funding the treasury. Germiny helped the railway companies obtain secured loans from the bank. He also had to deal with the issue of the Bank of Savoy, which claimed the right to issue bank notes. This was only resolved after he had left office. Germiny was forced to resign due to a serious illness as of 15 May 1863. He was replaced by Adolphe Vuitry, but kept the title of honorary governor.

== Senator ==
Le Bègue de Germiny was appointed to the Senate on 27 May 1863. In the Senate he voted for Napoleon III until it was dissolved on 4 September 1870 during the Franco-Prussian War. Germiny was called upon to sort out the financial confusion of the Convention of Miramar of 11 April 1864 after the Archduke Maximilian of Austria had accepted the crown of Mexico. The archduke had agreed to pay France 270 million to cover the costs of his expedition, but had no money and required a loan. Germiny was appointed head of an international commission, with English and Mexican members, to ensure payment. After the collapse of the Mexican adventure, Germiny lost much of his authority. Germiny was involved in various other financial affairs regarding the Crédit Mobilier, Compagnie immobilière, Imperial Ottoman Bank and the Orléans and Nord railway companies. At the time of the fall of the Second Empire during the Franco-Prussian War (19 July 1870 – 10 May 1871) he was President of the Compagnie des chantiers et ateliers de l’Océan (Marine shipyards company).

Germiny was devoted to the science of bien manger, and was known for his lavish receptions. He invented "Germiny Soup", with sorrel and cream served in a chilled cup. Charles Gabriel Le Bègue de Germiny died on 22 February 1871 at the château de Motteville near Yvetot, Seine-Maritime, aged 71. His son, Eugène Le Begue Germiny, was a distinguished advocate and municipal councillor in Paris, but became involved in a sex scandal in 1877 and moved to Buenos Aires.

== Sources ==
- "Charles Gabriel Le Bègue" (PDF) (in French). Banque de France.
- "Lebègue de Germiny (Charles)" (in French). IGPDE. 7 April 2010. Archived from the original on 11 January 2014.
- Robert, Adolphe (1889). Dictionnaire des parlementaires français... : depuis le 1er mai 1789 jusqu'au 1er mai 1889... / publ. sous la dir. de MM. Adolphe Robert, Edgar (PDF) (in French). Vol. 3 FES à LAV. Edgar Bourloton.
