= Victor Lanjuinais =

French politician

Victor Ambroise Lanjuinais
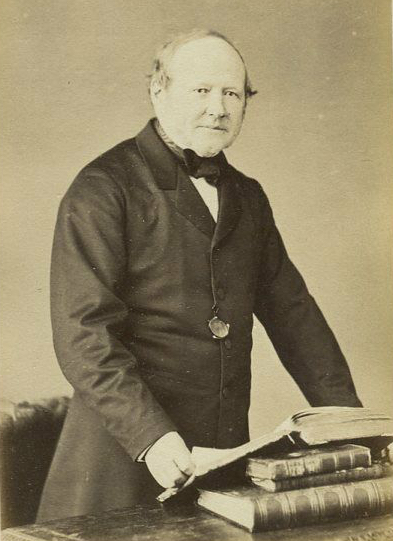
- Born: 5 November 1802; Paris, France
- Died: 1 January 1869 (aged 66); Paris, France
- Occupations: Soldier, Politician

Victor Ambroise Lanjuinais (5 November 1802 – 1 January 1869) was a French politician. He was a deputy from 1838 to 1848, and minister of Agriculture and Commerce in the second cabinet of Odilon Barrot (2 June 1849 to 31 October 1849).

== Monarchy ==
Victor Ambroise, vicomte de Lanjuinais, was born in Paris on 5 November 1802. His father was Jean Denis, comte Lanjuinais (1753–1827). His brother was Paul-Eugène Lanjuinais (1799–1812 ), a peer of France. Victor Lanjuinais studied law and was admitted to the bar. He was a friend of Gustave d'Eichthal, an author who was sympathetic to Africans and advocated mixed marriages to produce offspring with the complementary qualities of the black and white races. When John Stuart Mill visited Paris in 1830 he spent much time with Lanjuinais and Eichthal, finding the views of these young men refreshing and encouraging. Lanjuinais edited a multi-volume collection of the works of his father, and contributed a biographical preface to the work in 1832.

On 17 February 1838 Victor Lanjuinais was elected deputy for the third college of Loire-Inférieure (Pont-Rousseau). He sat on the center-left. He was reelected in March 1839, July 1842 and August 1846. He was a correspondent of the liberal thinker Alexis de Tocqueville. Lanjuinais belonged to a small group of deputies who followed Tocqueville in supporting the Orleans monarchy while agitating for democratic reforms. He was moderately opposed to the policy of François Guizot, and voted for the electoral reform proposal in 1847, but refused to join the Campagne des banquets (banquet campaign).

== Second Republic ==
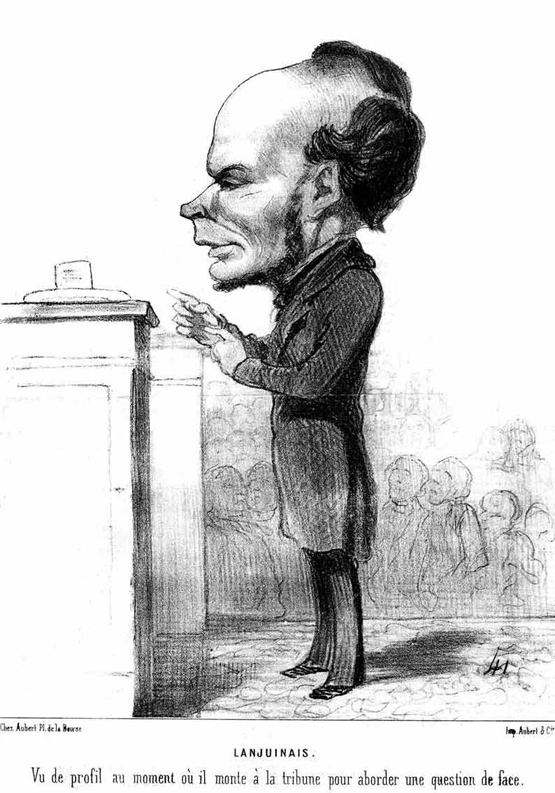
Lanjuinais addressing the Assembly in 1849, by Honoré Daumier

After the February Revolution of 1848 Lanjuinais was elected on 23 April 1848 to represent Loire-Inférieure in the Constituent Assembly. As Secretary and Member of the Finance Committee, he was a strong opponent of socialism, advocating a laissez-faire approach to economic issues. (Note: Lanjuinais remarked to Tocqueville that, "Socialism is our natural disease; it comes naturally from our laws, our ideas on government, from the political structure and administrative structure of our society. It is to centralization what the wild fruit is to the cultivated variety.) He was against paper money, and proposed to deal with the deficit by consolidating Treasury debts and issuing a loan for 200 million. After heated debate, his views prevailed. He was then charged with various important reports on finance issues. Lanjuinais was a member of the committee of inquiry into the events of 15 May and 23 June 1848, and sided with most of his colleagues in favor of repression. He supported the motion for voluntary dissolution of the Constituent Assembly after the adoption of the electoral law.

The royalist purists in Loire-Inférieure withdrew their support from Lanjuinais in the Legislative Assembly elections of 13 and 14 May 1849, and he was not reelected. He had retired to the country when he learned on 2 June 1849 that he had been appointed Minister of Commerce and Agriculture in the cabinet headed by Odilon Barrot. In by-elections on 8 July 1849 Lanjuinais ran as Conservative candidate and was elected to the Assembly for the Seine. As Minister of Commerce he was involved in suppressing the system of quarantines of the Levant. He wanted to end the monopoly of the Parisian bakery, but this decision was not confirmed by his successor. For three months Lanjuinais was also acting Minister of Public Education and Worship. The cabinet to which he belonged was dissolved on 31 October 1849, and he refused to participate in its successor. He did participate in several important committees of the Assembly.

== Second Empire ==
Lanjuinais opposed the coup of 2 December 1851, and was briefly detained at the Château de Vincennes. He returned to private life, and in 1857 refused to be a candidate to the Legislative body. On 1 June 1863 he was elected as an independent candidate for the second district of Loire-Inférieure. He sat with the Orleanist third party. Victor Ambrose Lanjuinais died in Paris on 1 January 1869. He was aged 66.

== Writings ==
- Notice historique sur la vie et les ouvrages du comte de Lanjuinais (Essay on the life and works of his father) (1832)
- New research on the question of gold (1863), Revue des deux Mondes
