= Hautpoul =

Hautpoul may refer to:

- Alphonse Henri, comte d'Hautpoul (1789–1865), French military officer and politician
- François d'Hautpoul (fl. ca. 1700), alleged Grand Master of the Priory of Sion
- Jean-Joseph Ange d'Hautpoul (1754-1807), French military officer

== See also ==
- Hautpoult, a 1807 French Navy ship
