= Cabinet of Alphonse Henri d'Hautpoul =

French cabinet from 1849–1851

- France; Cabinet of France
- Date formed: 31 October 1849
- Date dissolved: 24 January 1851

People and organisations
- Head of state: Louis Napoleon
- Head of government: Alphonse Henri d'Hautpoul

History
- Predecessor: Second cabinet of Odilon Barrot
- Successor: Petit ministère of 1851

The cabinet of Alphonse Henri d'Hautpoul was formed by President Louis Napoleon Bonaparte after he had dismissed the second cabinet of Odilon Barrot on 31 October 1849. The Hautpoul cabinet was made up of friends of the president rather than members of the assembly, and was led by Alphonse Henri d'Hautpoul.

On 24 January 1851, the cabinet was replaced by the Petit ministère of 1851.

== Ministers ==
The ministers were:

Portfolio	Holder	Party
Head of the Ministry	Alphonse Henri d'Hautpoul	Party of Order
Minister of Foreign Affairs	Alphonse de Rayneval	Independent
Minister of the Interior	Ferdinand Barrot	Party of Order
Minister of Justice	Eugène Rouher	Party of Order
Minister of Finance	Achille Fould	Party of Order
Minister of Public Works	Jean-Martial Bineau	Party of Order
Minister of Trade and Agriculture	Jean-Baptiste Dumas	Independent
Minister of Education	Félix Esquirou de Parieu	Party of Order
Minister of War	Alphonse Henri d'Hautpoul	Party of Order
Minister of the Navy and Colonies	Joseph Romain-Desfossés	Party of Order

Changes

- On 17 November 1849, Jean-Ernest Ducos de La Hitte substituted Alphonse de Rayneval as Foreign Affairs Minister.
- On 15 March 1850, Pierre Jules Baroche substituted Ferdinand Barrot as Interior Minister.
- On 22 October 1850, Jean-Paul de Schramm substituted Alphonse Henri d'Hautpoul as War Minister.

Upon 9 January 1851, the ministry was totally reshuffled with those who were aligned with President Louis-Napoléon Bonaparte. The ministers were:

Portfolio	Holder	Party
Head of the Ministry	Left vacant	
Minister of Foreign Affairs	Édouard Drouyn de Lhuys	Bonapartist
Minister of the Interior	Pierre Jules Baroche	Bonapartist
Minister of Justice	Eugène Rouher	Bonapartist
Minister of Finance	Achille Fould	Bonapartist
Minister of Public Works	Pierre Magne	Bonapartist
Minister of Trade and Agriculture	Louis Bernard Bonjean	Bonapartist
Minister of Education	Félix Esquirou de Parieu	Bonapartist
Minister of War	Auguste Regnaud de Saint-Jean d'Angély	Military
Minister of the Navy and Colonies	Théodore Ducos	Bonapartist

== Sources ==
- "Ministére du 31 octobre 1849". Table analytique par ordre alphabétique de matières et de noms de personnes du Compte rendu des séances de l'Assemblée nationale législative et des documents imprimés par son ordre: 28 mai 1849 – 2 déc. 1851. H. et C. Noblet. 1852.
- Ténot, Eugène (1870). Paris in December, 1851: Or, The Coup D't́at of Napoleon III. Hurd and Houghton. p. 19.
