= Cabinet of Léon Faucher =

1851 French cabinet

- France; Cabinet of France
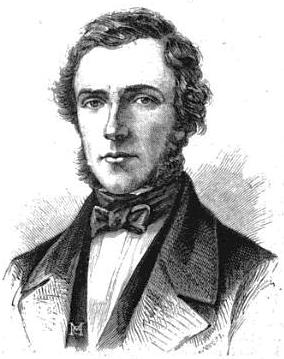
- Léon Faucher
- Date formed: 10 April 1851
- Date dissolved: 26 October 1851

People and organisations
- Head of state: Louis Napoleon
- Head of government: Léon Faucher

History
- Predecessor: Petit ministère of 1851
- Successor: Last cabinet of the French Second Republic

The Cabinet of Léon Faucher, in which Léon Faucher was the leading minister, was formed on 10 April 1851 by President Louis-Napoleon Bonaparte. It followed the Petit ministère of 1851. The cabinet was a compromise between the Parti de l'Ordre and the Bonapartists in the period before the coup d'état of 2 December 1851. The cabinet was replaced by the Last cabinet of the French Second Republic on 26 October 1851.

== Ministers ==
The ministers were:

Portfolio	Holder	Party
Head of the Ministry	Léon Faucher	Party of Order
Minister of Foreign Affairs	Pierre Jules Baroche	Bonapartist
Minister of the Interior	Léon Faucher	Party of Order
Minister of Justice	Eugène Rouher	Bonapartist
Minister of Finance	Achille Fould	Bonapartist
Minister of Public Works	Pierre Magne	Bonapartist
Minister of Trade and Agriculture	Louis Buffet	Party of Order
Minister of Education	Frédéric Dombidau de Crouseilhes	Party of Order
Minister of War	Jacques Louis Randon	Military
Minister of the Navy and Colonies	Prosper de Chasseloup-Laubat	Party of Order

== Sources ==
- Gabriel-Robez, Bernard. Les Secrets de la molune - La saga d'une famille jurassienne au XIXe siècle. Mon Petit Editeur. ISBN 978-2-7483-8063-7.
- Galisset, Ch. M. (1852). Corps du droit français ou recueil complet des lois, décrets, ordonnances, sénatusconsultes, règlements ... publiés depuis 1789 jusqu'à nos jours.
- Recueil général des lois, décrets et arrêtés. Recueil général des lois. 1851.
