= Gustave Rouland =

French lawyer and politician (1806–1878)

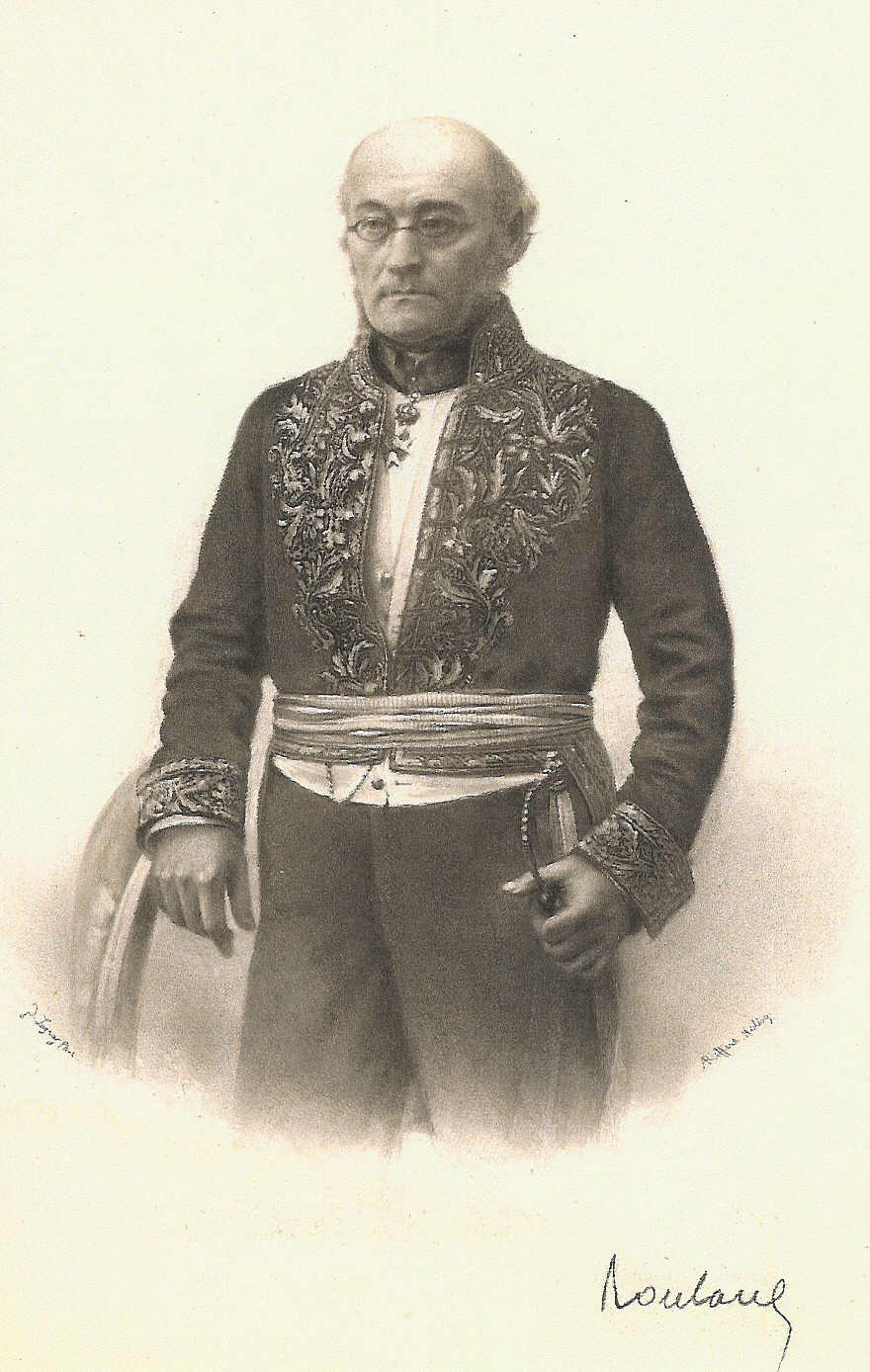
- Born: 3 February 1806; Yvetot, Seine-Inférieure, France
- Died: 12 December 1878 (aged 72); Paris, France
- Occupations: Magistrate and politician
- Known for: Governor of the Bank of France

Gustave Rouland (3 February 1806 – 12 December 1878) was a French lawyer and politician. During the Second French Empire he was Minister of Education and Religious Affairs from 1856 to 1863. In this role he undertook reforms to curb the influence of the church. He was later President of the Conseil d'Etat and then governor of the Banque de France from 1864 to 1878, with one short interruption.

== Early years ==
Gustave Rouland was born in Yvetot, Seine-Inférieure, France, on 3 December 1806. He was the grandson of a farmer and son of an attorney. He attended Rouen College, where he was an exceptional student, and then studied law at the Faculty of Law of Paris. He was admitted to the bar in 1827, and entered the judiciary as a magistrate in the court of Les Andelys. In 1828 in Dieppe he married Julie Félicité Cappon (born 1804), daughter of a clerk of Dieppe.

Rouland had a brilliant judicial career under the July Monarchy. He became in turn deputy prosecutor in Louviers (1828) and Évreux (1 June 1831) and prosecutor in Dieppe (1 October 1831). In 1832 he was noted by the deputy Hély d'Oissel as one of the most remarkable young men at the royal court of Rouen, with wide knowledge of the law, easy and brilliant elocution and excellent judgement. In 1835, in an article in the Revue de Rouen, Rouland criticized the complacency and irrelevance of academies such as that of Rouen that ignored the new advances in science, industry and literature. In Rouen he was appointed deputy prosecutor, deputy crown prosecutor-general (17 January 1835) and advocate-general (1 November 1838). He became attorney general in Douai (April 28, 1843).

== Early political career ==
Rouland was elected on 1 August 1846 as deputy for Dieppe in the Seine-Inférieure department. He sat with the majority, spoke on legislative issues, and on 23 May 1847 was appointed Advocate General at the Court of cassation. He had to run for reelection before he could take this office, and was returned without difficulty. Rouland resigned his position as magistrate in the February Revolution of 1848. He was reinstated on 10 July 1849 and was appointed Attorney General at the Court of Appeals of Paris on 10 February 1853.

== Minister of Education and Cults ==
On the death of Hippolyte Fortoul, the emperor made Rouland Minister of Education and Religious Affairs. The emperor had at first wanted to appoint Paul Séverin Abbatucci as minister. He was a Corsican, hostile both to priests and to supporters of the former monarchy. However, Abbatucci declined due to his age and instead suggested Rouland.

=== Religion ===
Rouland was a sincere Catholic, but was Gallican in his leanings. He made it his goal to strengthen the role of the state in religious affairs. His choice as minister indicated that the emperor was opposed to the growing power of the clergy and to ultramontanism. (Note: Napoleon III played an ambiguous role in the Italian unification process, which would destroy the temporal power of the papacy. He maintained troops in Rome from 1848 to 1870 to protect Pope Pius IX and the Papal States. On the other hand he helped drive Austrian troops out of Northern Italy in 1859 (and accepted Nice and Savoy in return), and helped obtain Venetia for Italy in 1866.) Rouland was Minister from 13 August 1856 to 24 June 1863. He was made a senator on 14 November 1857.

At first Rouland followed a moderate policy to avoid upsetting the Empress Eugénie and Walewski. However, from 1860 the struggle for Italian unification caused the clergy to become increasingly open in their opposition to imperial policy, and Rouland took more positive steps. Rouland was particularly hostile to female religious orders. On 1 December 1861 he published a memorandum in which he criticized the willingness of these congregations to admit minors without obtaining the permission of their parents or guardians, and said that in future this would result in formal legal prosecution. He initiated an inquiry into female religious houses following a number of reported cases of young girls being hidden from their parents under false names, becoming insane through religious ecstasies and being sexually abused.

Rouland tried to restrict the growth of religious orders. He blocked donations and bequests to schools if they specified that the school must remain religious. He reduced the number of permits for new women's establishments, and refused to accept any unauthorized new male orders, such as the Jesuits or Capuchins. After 1860 few new female congregations were allowed and no male ones. He also tried to appoint more Gallican bishops, and increasingly came into conflict with the Pope, who refused to institute them. He continued negotiations over recognition by the Pope of state-run theological faculties, but no agreement could be reached over the division of rights between the church and the state. Rouland also pushed for open civil law trials of clergy, where before justice had been managed through discreet agreements with bishops.

=== Education ===
In the field of education, Rouland continued his struggle against the clergy. He enforced the ban on private institutions taking the title of college. All schools were forced to charge for tuition, regardless of their statutes, thus removing any competitive advantage of religious schools over state-run schools. Rouland regulated municipal schools run by brothers, gave teachers more protection against priests and limited transfers of schools from lay to religious teachers. He also enacted stricter control on private schools, and obtained more funds for public education. Rouland appointed lay women inspectors to investigate the quality of education for girls in schools around the country. One of these, Marie Caillard, recommended requiring each commune to provide a separate girls' primary school, improving the training of both lay and religious teachers and giving them the same pay.

Rouland was able to persuade municipal councils to take back some of the secondary schools they had handed over to the church. There was a significant drop in the number of religious schools compared to the new state institutions and a drop, although smaller, in the percentage of children educated in religious schools, particularly boys. Despite this, Rouland was not liberal in his religious views, and opposed Protestant evangelization. He founded a chair in comparative linguistics for Ernest Renan at the College de France on 11 January 1862, but suspended Renan's course the day after the opening lecture on 18 January 1862 for his "attacks on Christian beliefs."

In 1858 Rouland separated the agrégations of mathematics and of physical and natural sciences, formerly a single subject. However, although Rouland understood the importance of a modern education, he yielded to pressure from the university to reverse some of the reforms of his predecessor, returning to a more conventional curriculum in which study of the classics dominated. In 1862 Rouland completed a review of the requirements for schools that would meet the needs of industrial and agricultural development. He did not have time to implement these new vocational schools in the last year of his term in office.

Rouland encouraged the study of local history, philology and archaeology at the Comité des travaux historiques (CTH) and created a scientific section. In the spring of 1859 he issued a circular on undertaking an archaeological inventory of France. In 1862, at the opening the Palair des facultés in Nancy, Rouland said his audience should be inspired by "the traditions that live upon this land of Lorraine, and which France, our common patrie, accepts and glorifies." He initiated the annual Congrès des sociétés savantes in 1861, where officials of his ministry could mingle with leaders of the scientific world. After leaving office Rouland was appointed a member of the Superior Council of Public Instruction on 7 November 1863. In 1867 he said that prefects should have the right to select teachers, saying "the teacher should be a friend of public order, the friend of the government."

== Later career ==
=== President of the Council of State ===
Rouland was reassigned after the cabinet shuffle following the 1863 elections. He was awarded the Grand Cross of the Legion of Honour on 14 August 1863. He was Minister and President of the Council of State from 18 October 1863 to 27 September 1864. Rouland was vice-president of the senate for part of 1864.

=== Governor of the Bank of France ===
On 28 September 1864 Rouland was appointed Governor of the Bank of France in succession to Adolphe Vuitry. He held this post until 12 December 1878, with one short interruption. Rouland did not have a background in finance, so relied on the expertise of other members of the bank's board. He would present the government's views, but would accede to the opinions of the board and then defend them in public. During the Franco-Prussian War (19 July 1870 – 10 May 1871) and subsequent upheavals Rouland managed to preserve the Bank's funds and the crown jewels, with the help of the deputy governor Fréderic Cuvier.

During Rouland's tenure there was serious debate about the value of European monetary union. The main argument in its favor was that it would reduce the transaction costs of tourists and businessmen, who constantly lost money as they exchanged from one currency to another. The English economist William Stanley Jevons argued in favor, while Walter Bagehot, editor of The Economist was opposed. Rouland also argued against monetary union, asserting that most international transactions were through bills of exchange or remittance of bullion, and that costs would be unavoidable in such transactions even with unification. He opposed issuance of a new 25-franc gold coin, which he saw as a covert method of moving towards unification.

On 5 June 1871 Rouland was appointed Attorney General to the Court of Auditors. Ernest Picard was appointed in his place as Governor of the Bank of France, but refused to accept the position. Picard's decision seems have been due to strong opposition from the bank. Rouland was reinstated as Governor of the Bank of France on 30 December 1871, holding this position until 12 December 1878.

=== Other positions ===
Rouland was General Counsel to the canton of Yvetot, secretary and president of the departmental assembly. On 30 January 1876 Rouland was elected Senator of the Seine-Inférieure. He sat with the Bonapartist right. He died in office on 12 December 1878, at the premises of the Bank of France, from an "attack of gout rising to the heart" (accès de goutte remontée au cœur). He was buried in Omonville. His son Hippolyte Rouland later became a senator. His grandson Julien Gustave André Rouland (1860–1937) also became a deputy and then a senator.
