= Adolphe Vuitry =

French lawyer, economist, and politician

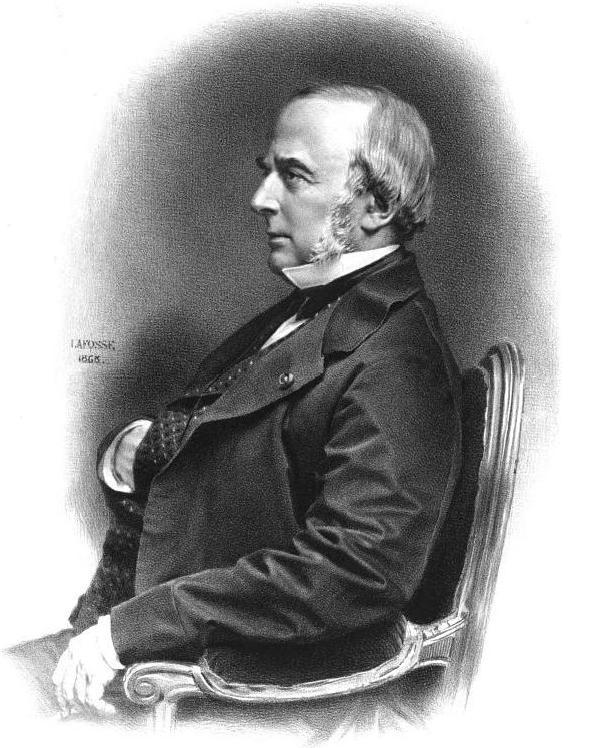
- Born: 31 March 1813; Sens, Yonne, France
- Died: 23 June 1885 (aged 72); Marolles-sur-Seine, France
- Occupations: Lawyer, economist, politician
- Known for: President of the Conseil d'Etat

Adolphe Vuitry (French pronunciation: [adɔlf vɥitʁi], 31 March 1813 – 23 June 1885) was a French lawyer, economist, and politician. He became recognized as an expert on finance. He was governor of the Banque de France from 1863 to 1864, then Minister-President of the Conseil d'Etat (Council of State) from 1864 to 1869. In his later years he devoted himself to historical studies, publishing many works on medieval and modern finance.

== Early years 1813–1848 ==
Adolphe Vuitry's family originated in Champagne and the Ardennes. An ancestor named Pierre Vuitry (1672–1732) is described as a farm worker from Machault, near to Vouziers. His great-grandfather, also Pierre Vuitry, was a tax collector and his grandfather was an advocate in Paris. By the end of the Ancien Régime the family was prosperous and influential. Their position was not damaged by the French Revolution. Adolphe's father Martin Vuitry (1786–1879) was named Engineer of Sens in the Yonne department in 1810, where he married Amable Lousie Hardy in 1812. His father pursued a political career from 1823, and was a liberal deputy under the July Monarchy.

Adolphe Vuitry was born in Sens on 31 March 1813. He studied at the lycée in Sens, the Collège Sainte-Barbe in Paris, and the Lycée Louis-le-Grand. He was a brilliant student. While studying mathematics he enrolled in the Faulty of Law of Paris, and at the age of eighteen sat his first legal examination. At almost the same time he was accepted by the École Polytechnique. At first he studied engineering (bridges and roads) but then transferred to the study of law. He obtained the title of Doctor of Law in 1838. He began work in the office of the barrister Jean-Baptiste Teste.

He did not plead many cases, and soon left the court to join the administration. In 1839 he became a member of the office of Jean-Baptiste Teste, now Minister of Justice and Religious Affairs, and retained his position when the portfolio passed to Alexandre-François Vivien in 1840 and then to Nicolas Martin du Nord in 1841. In 1840 he married Marie-Caroline-Jenny Bret (1820–1905). He was named head of the first section of the Department of Religious Affairs in 1841, and was promoted to deputy director in 1844. Vuitry resigned in 1846 to join the Council of State, where he was attached to the litigation section. He held this post through the February Revolution of 1848, protected by Achille Fould. The revolution caused him "deep regrets" but did not affect his career.

== Second Republic and Empire 1848–1870 ==
After the 1848 revolution Vuitry was recalled to the Council of State and reappointed to the litigation section. From 26 April 1851 to 26 October 1851 Vuitry was Deputy Secretary of State for Finance under Achille Fould. In that time he made only two speeches before the Legislative Assembly, one on savings banks and the other on packet boat concessions in the Mediterranean. In this short period he learned a great deal, and became recognized as a financial expert. By decree of 13 December 1851 Vuitry was appointed a member of the Administration section of the Advisory Committee to the Finance Committee. He also participated in a committee that drafted the statutes of Crédit Foncier de France.

On 25 January 1852 Vuitry was appointed Councillor of State, Division of Finance. He was part of a minority that opposed the confiscation of the property of the House of Orleans, and would be suspected of Orleanism throughout his subsequent career. He was rapporteur on most bills related to finance, was signatory to the explanatory notes of the main financial laws from 1855 to 1863, defended the regime's budgets to the House and responded to questions on the budget from deputies. On 18 May 1857 he made an important speech on extension of the privileges of the Bank of France. He was promoted to President of the Finance section on 24 June 1857.

Vuitry was elected a member of the Academy of Moral and Political Sciences in 1862. He was appointed Governor of the Bank of France on 15 May 1863, replacing Charles Le Bègue de Germiny. On 28 September 1864 he was replaced by Gustave Rouland. During his term of office he faced a crisis in 1863–1864, offered special facilities to the Treasury and ended the case of the Bank of Savoy.

On 28 September 1864 Vuitry returned to the Council of State as Minister-President. Under his leadership the political power of the Council grew, while he remained loyal to the emperor. He continued to defend the financial measures of the government in the House in face of violent attacks by opponents of the empire in 1864 and 1865. On August 4, 1867, by Imperial Decree, Vuitry was elevated to the Grand Cross of the Imperial Order of the Legion of Honor. Vuitry resigned from the Council of State on 17 July 1869 in protest against the increasingly liberal policies of the regime. He was appointed to the Senate by decree on 21 July 1869. Vuitry was General Counsel of the Yonne department from 1852 to 1870. After 1865 he chaired the departmental assembly.

== Later years 1871–1885 ==
Following the Franco-Prussian War (19 July 1870 – 10 May 1871) and the fall of the empire, Vuitry was chairman of the board of the Compagnie du Paris-Lyon-Méditerranée from 25 August 1871 to 15 November 1878, and then honorary president. He served as a director of the Nationale insurance company. He spent his last years engaged in historical studies. Vuitry was made an Officer of the Legion of Honour in 1858 and a Commander in 1860. He was awarded the Grand Cross of the Legion of Honour in 1867. Vuitry died in the priory of Saint-Donain in Marolles-sur-Seine in the department of Seine-et-Marne on 23 June 1885 aged 72. He is buried in the Père Lachaise Cemetery. His son-in-law, Henri Germain, was founder and chairman of Crédit Lyonnais.

Vuitry was an indefatigable worker, and had a great store of knowledge. He was a good speaker, but lacked aggression. He disliked the passionate and emotional debates in the House, and was nervous when he had to speak there. But he excelled in other roles, and was always calm, polite and thoughtful in meetings of the Council of State.

== Writings ==
Some of Vuitry's writings from his time in office are reported in:

- Souvenir. M. Adolphe Vuitry, Paris, A. Hennuyer, 1887 [BNF : 8° Ln27 37 100]
- Rapports et discours de M. Adolphe Vuitry, ancien ministre présidant le Conseil d’Etat, membre de l’Institut, Paris, A. Hennuyer, 1887 [BNF : 8° Le1 98]

In his later years Vuitry wrote many studies on medieval and modern finances:

- Les impôts romains dans la France du VIe au Xe siècle, Orléans, Impr. A. Colas, 1873, 152 p. [BNF : 8° Lf76 175]
- Les monnaies et le régime monétaire de la monarchie féodale, de Hugues Capet à Philippe le Bel (687-sic-1285), Orléans, Impr. A. Colas, 1876, 80 p. [BNF : 8° Lj22 65]
- L’aide féodale sous Philippe le Bel et ses trois fils, 1285–1328, Orléans, Impr. A. Colas, 1879, 31 p. [BNF : 8° Lf88 121]
- Les monnaies sous Philippe le Bel et ses trois fils, 1285–1328, Orléans, Impr. A. Colas, 1879, 61 p. [BNF : 8° Lj27 66]
- Le Gouvernement royal et l’administration des finances sous Philippe le Bel et ses trois fils (1285–1328), Orléans, Impr. A. Colas, 1880, 90 p. [BNF : 8° Lb20 29]
- Les monnaies sous les trois premiers Valois, 1328–1380, Orléans, Impr. A. Colas, 1881, 140 p. [BNF : 8° Lj27 74]
- L’origine et l’établissement de l’impôt pour les trois premiers Valois (1328–1380), Orléans, Impr. A. Colas, 1883, 76 p. [BNF : 8° Lf82 20]
- Etudes sur le régime financier de la France avant la Révolution [on trouve parfois avant 1789], Paris, Guillaumin, 1878–1883, in 3 volumes [BNF : 8° Lf76 179]
  - I – Les impôts romains dans la France du VIe au Xe siècle et Le régime financier de la monarchie féodale aux XIe, XIIe et XIIIe siècles
  - II – Philippe le Bel et ses trois fils, 1285–1328
  - III – Les trois premiers Valois, 1328–1380
- Le désordre des finances et les excès de la spéculation à la fin du règne de Louis XIV et au commencement du règne de Louis XV, Paris, C. Lévy, 1885, XVIII-462 p. (reprint of a series of articles that appeared in the Revue des deux Mondes in 1884) [BNF : 8° Lf76 195]
