= Petit ministère of 1851 =

Seventh government of the sixth republic

- France; Cabinet of France
- Date formed: 24 January 1851
- Date dissolved: 10 April 1851

People and organisations
- Head of state: Louis Napoleon

History
- Predecessor: Cabinet of Alphonse Henri d'Hautpoul
- Successor: Cabinet of Léon Faucher

The Petit ministère of 1851 governed France from 24 January 1851 to 10 April 1851 during the French Second Republic, replacing the Cabinet of Alphonse Henri d'Hautpoul. It was a compromise cabinet formed by President Louis-Napoleon Bonaparte after the National Legislative Assembly had refused to accept a cabinet dominated by Bonapartists, and had no president. It was replaced by the Cabinet of Léon Faucher on 10 April 1851. The ministers were:

Portfolio	Holder	Party
Head of the Ministry	Eugène Rouher	Bonapartist
Minister of Foreign Affairs	Anatole Brénier de Renaudière	Independent
Minister of the Interior	Claude-Marius Vaïsse	Independent
Minister of Justice	Ernest de Royer	Bonapartist
Minister of Finance	Charles Le Bègue de Germiny	Independent
Minister of Public Works	Pierre Magne	Bonapartist
Minister of Trade and Agriculture	Eugène Schneider	Independent
Minister of Education	Charles Giraud	Bonapartist
Minister of War	Jacques Louis Randon	Military
Minister of the Navy and Colonies	Auguste-Nicolas Vaillant	Military

== Sources ==
- Gabriel-Robez, Bernard. Les Secrets de la molune - La saga d'une famille jurassienne au XIXe siècle. Mon Petit Editeur. ISBN 978-2-7483-8063-7.
- Recueil général des lois, décrets et arrêtés. Recueil général des lois. 1851.
