= Marie Jean Pierre Pie Frédéric Dombidau de Crouseilhes =

French politician

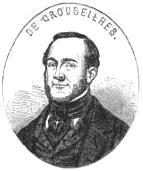
- From L'Illustration, journal universel, 20 septembre 1850
- Born: 11 July 1792; Oloron, Pyrénées-Atlantiques, France
- Died: 19 February 1861 (aged 68); Paris, France
- Occupation: Politician
- Known for: Minister of Education and Religious Affairs

Marie Jean Pierre Pie Frédéric Dombidau de Crouseilhes (11 July 1792 – 19 February 1861) was a French lawyer and politician. He was Minister of Education and Religious Affairs from April to October 1851.

== Life ==
Marie Jean Pierre Frédéric Dombidau Pie, Baron de Crouseilhes was born in Oloron, Pyrénées-Atlantiques, on 11 July 1792. His father was a magistrate. He studied law in Paris, and was accepted as an advocate in 1812. He became the advocate-general at the royal court of Pau. He married one of the daughters of the ambassador Choiseul-Gouffier.

In 1821 Crouseilhes was appointed to the Conseil d'Etat. In 1824 he became Secretary General of the Ministry of Justice. In 1828 he was appointed dean of the criminal division of the Court of Cassation. He was made a peer of France in 1845.

Crouseilhes was elected a deputy in the Legislative Assembly in 1849. He was Minister of Public Instruction and Worship from 10 April 1851 to 26 October 1851. He was appointed to the Senate. He died on 19 February 1861.
