= Léon de Maleville =

French politician

François Jean Léon de Maleville
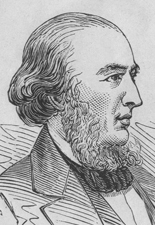
- Born: 8 May 1803; Montauban, Tarn-et-Garonne, France
- Died: 28 March 1879 (aged 75); Montauban, Tarn-et-Garonne, France
- Occupation: Politician
- Known for: Minister of the Interior

François Jean Léon de Maleville (8 May 1803 – 28 March 1879) was a French politician. Under the July Monarchy he was a deputy from 1834 to 1848. During the French Second Republic he was a representative in the Constituent Assembly in 1848–49, and was Minister of the Interior for a few days in 1848. He was a representative in the Legislative Assembly in 1849-52, and was again elected as representative in 1871-75, and as Senator from 1875 until his death in 1879.

== Early years ==
François Jean Léon de Maleville was born in Montauban, Tarn-et-Garonne, on 8 May 1803. His family was of the Protestant nobility. His parents were Pierre de Maleville de Condat and Marie Adrienne Sophie de Preissec. After studying law in Paris Maleville was accepted as an advocate and joined the office of the legitimist advocate Hennequin. His maternal uncle François Jean de Preissec (1778-1852) was appointed prefect of Gers in 1828, and Maleville became his personal secretary. The same year he published anonymously a political comedy, Les tribulations de M. le préfet, scènes électorales, His uncle resigned when the ministry of Jules de Polignac took office, then returned to the administration as prefect of the Gironde department after the July Revolution of 1830. Léon de Maleville became General Secretary of the Gironde department (Bordeaux) until 1833.

== July Monarchy ==
Maleville resigned in 1833 to enter politics. He was elected the next year for the Caussade district of Tarn-et-Garonne, and took his place on the left. He was the youngest member of the Chamber. He supported the government of Adolphe Thiers in February 1836, then went into opposition with the government of Molé. He was reelected on 4 November 1837 and on 2 March 1839. In the second Thiers government of 1 March 1840 he was appointed Undersecretary of State at the Department of the Interior. To take this position he had to renew his mandate, and was confirmed on 28 March 1840. On 23 October 1840 he was awarded the Officer's Cross of the Legion of Honor. A few days later the government of Adolphe Thiers fell.

Following this, as a member of the third party Maleville was a determined opponent of the policy of François Guizot. He was reelected on 9 July 1842 and on 1 August 1846. He spoke out against corruption. In 1846 the center support his candidacy for vice-president of the Chamber. The next year he joined the Reform movement. In February 1848 he was a signatory of the proposal to impeach the Guizot ministry.

== Second Republic ==
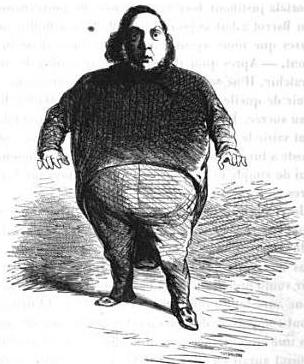
Caracature of Léon de Maleville by Cham

Maleville was elected to the Constituent Assembly on 23 April 1848, representing Tarn-et-Garonne. He sat on the right, and soon became a member of the committee of the Rue de Poitiers. On 20 December 1848 he was made Minister of the Interior by the President, Louis-Napoleon Bonaparte. The appointment was short-lived. He disagreed with the President on several important points, and resigned his portfolio on 29 December 1848. He was replaced by Léon Faucher. Maleville was not reelected to his department in the Legislative Assembly elections of 13 and 14 May 1849. He was returned as deputy for the Seine in a by-election on 8 July 1849. He continued to belong to the majority opposed to republican institutions, but he strongly opposed the coup d'etat of 2 December 1851.

== Third Republic ==
Maleville returned to private life during the Second French Empire (1852–1870). After the fall of the Empire during the Franco-Prussian War, he ran successfully for election to the National Assembly on 8 February 1871. He was elected for two departments, Landes and Tarn-et-Garonne, and chose to represent Tarn-et-Garonne. He joined the Centre gauche parliamentary group and supported the policy of Thiers, his personal friend. He was elected vice-president of the Assembly.

Maleville was the third senator for life elected on 10 December 1875. He did not play an active role in the Senate. He died on 28 March 1879 at Montauban, aged 75. He married Jeanne Marie Sicard-Duval, from Mauritius, on 21 April 1847. They had one daughter, who married Henri Courtois, and whose children in 1905 obtained the right to call themselves Coutois de Maleville.
