= Cliponville =

- Commune
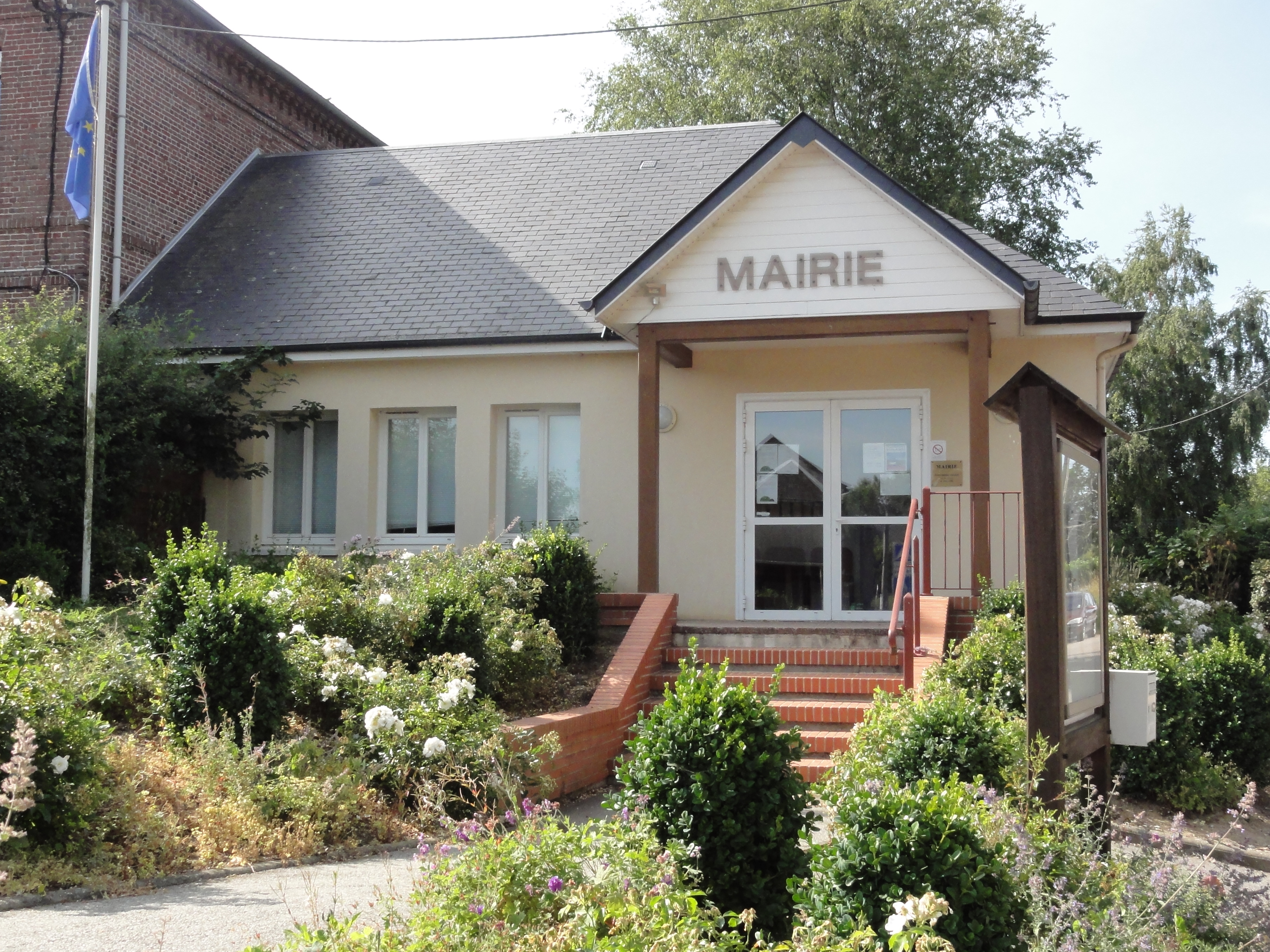
- Town hall
- Location of Cliponville
- Location within France Location within Normandy
- Coordinates: 49°40′37″N 0°39′36″E
- Country: France
- Region: Normandy
- Department: Seine-Maritime
- Arrondissement: Le Havre
- Canton: Saint-Valery-en-Caux
- Intercommunality: Caux Seine Agglo

Government
  - Mayor (2026–32): Jean-François Lemesle
- Area^{1}: 7.28 km^{2} (2.81 sq mi)
- Elevation: 120 m (390 ft)
- Highest elevation: 141 m (463 ft)
- Lowest elevation: 70 m (230 ft)
- Population (2023): 245
  - Density: 33.7/km^{2} (87.2/sq mi)
- Time zone: UTC+01:00 (CET)
  - Summer (DST): UTC+02:00 (CEST)
- INSEE/Postal code: 76182 /76640
- ^{1} French Land Register data, which excludes lakes, ponds, glaciers > 1 km^{2} (0.386 sq mi or 247 acres) and river estuaries.

Cliponville (French pronunciation: [klipɔ̃vil]) is a commune in the Seine-Maritime department in the Normandy region in northern France.

== Geography ==
A small farming village situated in the Pays de Caux, some 28 miles (45 km) northeast of Le Havre, at the junction of the D5, D149 and D228 roads.

== Population ==
Historical population
Year	Pop.	±% p.a.
1968	248	—
1975	225	−1.38%
1982	212	−0.85%
1990	216	+0.23%
1999	245	+1.41%
2007	237	−0.41%
2012	280	+3.39%
2017	277	−0.22%
2023	245	−2.03%
Source: INSEE

== Places of interest ==
- The church of St.Martin, dating from the twelfth century.

== See also ==
- Communes of the Seine-Maritime department
