= Théobald de Lacrosse =

French soldier and politician

Bertrand Théobald Joseph de Lacrosse
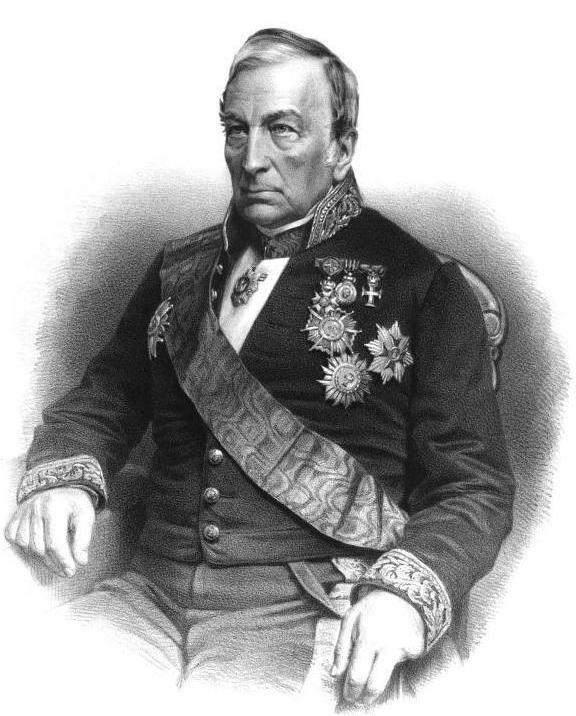
- Théobald de Lacrosse
- Born: 29 January 1796; Brest, Finistère, France
- Died: 28 March 1865 (aged 69); Paris, France
- Occupations: Soldier and politician
- Known for: Minister of Public Works

Bertrand Théobald Joseph de Lacrosse (29 January 1796 – 28 March 1865) was a French soldier and politician. He was twice Minister of Public Works during the French Second Republic.

== Early years ==
Bertrand Théobald Joseph de Lacrosse was born in Brest, Finistère, on 29 January 1796, son of Admiral Jean-Baptiste Raymond, Baron Lacrosse (1765–1829). He was descended from an ancient family of the Agenais. He was a student at the Collège Sainte-Barbe. In 1809 he entered the navy, and became a cadet in 1811. After a few campaigns on the frigate Hortense and the pram Ville de Mayence he joined the Army. He graduated from cavalry school in 1813 with the rank of second lieutenant in the cavalry of the Imperial Guard. He distinguished himself at the Battle of Dessau, where he was wounded, and took part, as a first lieutenant in the Battle of Craonne (1814), where he received seventeen injuries. His conduct earned him the Cross of the Legion of Honour and the rank of captain. He was discharged in 1815 and lived in retirement until the July Revolution of 1830.

== July Monarchy ==
On 1 August 1830 Lacrosse was appointed Lieutenant-Colonel of the National Guard of Brest. In 1831 he was promoted to colonel. He was also a member of the General Council of the Finistère. On 21 June 1834 he was elected as deputy for the 1st constituency of the Finistère, running on a Liberal platform. Lacrosse sat with the left and was mildly opposed to the policy of the ministers of King Louis Philippe. He was reelected on 4 November 1837, and joined the coalition against the Louis-Mathieu Molé ministry.

Lacrosse was again elected on 2 March 1839, supported the policy of Adolphe Thiers and opposed François Guizot. In 1842, after the ministerial journal le Globe had published allegations against his father, he fought a duel with the journalist Adolphe Granier de Cassagnac in which he was hit by a ball that fractured his thigh. He was reelected on 5 July 1842 and 1 August 1846. Throughout his time as deputy in the July Monarchy he paid special attention to naval affairs.

== Second Republic ==
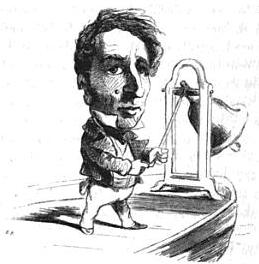
1850 cartoon of Lacrosse by Cham

After the February Revolution of 1848, Lacrosse was elected representative of Finistère in the Constituent Assembly. In June he was given command of the departmental national guards. He was one of the secretaries, then one of the Vice-Presidents of the Assembly. He then joined the Conservative party, voting regularly with the right.

After the presidential election of 10 December 1848 Lacrosse gave his full support to the Government of Louis-Napoleon Bonaparte, who made him Minister of Public Works from 29 December 1848 to 30 October 1849. For a few months he was also interim Minister of the Interior. He was reelected on 13 May 1849, representing the Finistère in the Legislative Assembly. He fully supported the government and the majority. He was named vice-president of the Assembly. From 26 October 1851 to 2 December 1851 he was again Minister of Public Works. During his two terms in this office he inaugurated the railways of the North, the East and Nantes. He began clearances near the Louvre and prepared for its final completion.

== Second Empire ==
After the coup of 2 December 1851 Lacrosse was appointed a member of the Consultative Commission, and President of the section of the Navy and Finance in the interim Council of State. On 26 January 1852 he promoted to the senate, of which he became the secretary. He supported imperial policy in the senate until his death. Théobald de Lacrosse died in Paris on 28 March 1865, aged 69.
