= Joseph Marcellin Rullière =

French politician

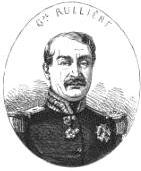
Rulliere Joseph

Joseph Marcellin Rullière (9 June 1787, Saint-Didier-en-Velay – 24 August 1862, Paris) was a French politician.

== Life ==
He was admitted to velites of the Old Guard in 1807, lieutenant in 1809. He served during the Hundred Days. He was at the Siege of Antwerp in 1832 as a field marshal. He was promoted Lieutenant General after the second expedition of Constantine, Algeria in 1837. He was made Peer of France, in 1845. He was Representative of the Loire to the Constituent Assembly of 1848 and the National Legislative Assembly in 1849. He was a Deputy and Minister of the War Department in the Prince-President Napoleon III in 1848.

Political offices
Preceded by Louis Juchault de Lamoricière	Minister of War; 20 December 1848 – 31 October 1849	Succeeded by Alphonse Henri, comte d'Hautpoul
