= Alphonse Henri d'Hautpoul =

French soldier and politician (1789–1865)

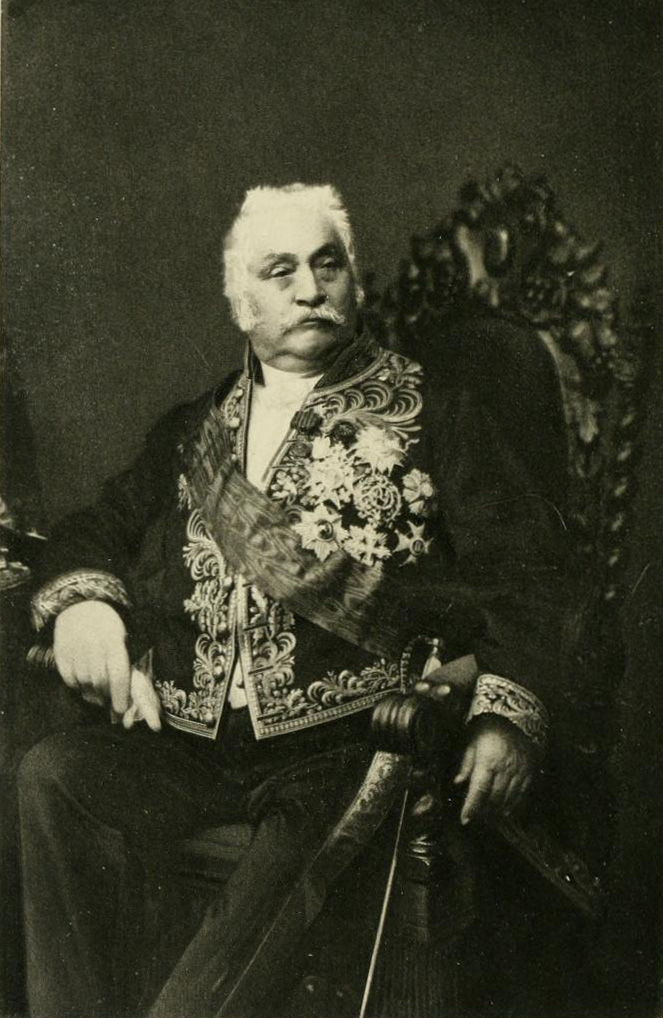

Prime Minister of France
- In office 31 October 1849 – 10 April 1851
- President: Louis-Napoléon Bonaparte
- Preceded by: Odilon Barrot
- Succeeded by: Léon Faucher

Personal details
- Born: 4 January 1789 Versailles, France
- Died: 27 July 1865 (aged 76) Paris, France
- Party: None

Military service
- Branch/service: French Army
- Rank: Lieutenant-general

Alphonse Henri, comte d'Hautpoul (French pronunciation: [alfɔ̃s ɑ̃ʁi kɔ̃t dopul]; 4 January 1789 – 27 July 1865) was a French general and politician. He was the Prime Minister of France from 31 October 1849 to 10 April 1851 during the French Second Republic.

== Biography ==
D'Hautpoul was born in Versailles, and educated at the military school of Fontainebleau (École spéciale militaire de Saint-Cyr). As a lieutenant in the 59th Regiment he took part in the German campaign of 1806 and in the Polish campaign of 1807. In 1808 he was sent to serve in Spain where he fought in the Peninsular War until 1812.

On 22 July 1812 he was wounded and taken prisoner in the Battle of Salamanca. Released from captivity in May 1814, he was promoted to command of a battalion. After Napoléon's return from Elba he served as aide-de-camp to the Duke of Angoulême. Promoted to colonel in October 1815, he was given command of the Legion of the Aude (4th Line Regiment). In 1823 he was promoted to brigadier-general and given command of the 3rd Infantry Regiment of the Royal Guard, with which partook in the 1823 Spanish campaign. In 1830 d'Hautpoul was elected deputy for the Aude (1830–1838). He was appointed director of the war administration for 4 months in 1830.

Promoted to lieutenant-general in 1841, he fought the following two years in Algeria.

Appointed to the Peerage of France in 1848, he was appointed minister of war and president of the council in 1849. He resigned after incidents between supporters and opposition of Bonaparte and returned to Algeria as governor-general.

== See also ==
- List of prime ministers of France

== Sources ==
- "Hautpoul (Alphonse-Henri, comte d')", Biographie des célébrités militaires des armées de terre et de mer de 1789 à 1850 – H

Political offices
Preceded by Odilon Barrot	Prime Minister of France; 31 October 1849 – 10 April 1851	Succeeded by Léon Faucher
Preceded by Joseph Marcellin Rulhières	Minister of War; 31 October 1849 – 22 October 1850	Succeeded by Jean-Paul, comte de Schramm
Preceded by Viala Charon	Governor General of Algeria; 22 October 1850 to 10 May 1851	Succeeded by Aimable Pélissier
