= Party of Order =

Party of Order Parti de l'Ordre
- Leaders: Adolphe Thiers; Odillon Barrot; François Guizot; Alexis de Tocqueville
- Founded: 1848; 178 years ago
- Dissolved: 1852; 174 years ago
- Merger of: Movement Party; Resistance Party; Other Legitimists
- Headquarters: 12, rue de Poitiers, Paris
- Ideology: Conservatism (French); Liberal conservatism; Monarchism (majority); Factions: Legitimism; Orléanism; Republicanism
- Political position: Centre-right to right-wing
- Colours: Blue White
- Slogan: "Order, Property, Religion"

The Rue de Poitiers Committee (French: Comité de la rue de Poitiers), best known as the Party of Order (French: Parti de l'Ordre), was a political group formed by monarchists and conservatives in the French Parliament during the French Second Republic. It included monarchist members from both the Orléanist and Legitimist factions and also some republicans who admired the United States model of government.

After the 1848 elections to the French Parliament, the Party of Order was the second-largest group of deputies after the Moderate Republicans, with 250 of the 900 seats in the French Parliament. Prominent members included Adolphe Thiers, François Guizot and Alexis de Tocqueville. The party won an absolute majority in the 1849 general election and were opposed to the presidency of Louis-Napoléon Bonaparte, although he included members of the party in his administration in order to court the political centre-right.

The party enjoyed widespread support in the north of France in the 1849 elections, the departments of Finistère, Côtes-du Nord, Manche, Calvados, Eure, Somme and Aisne as well as Deux-Sèvres, Vienne, Vaucluse and Haute-Garonne returned exclusively Party of Order members to the French Parliament. Support was lower in the east of the country.

After the Louis-Napoléon Bonaparte's coup d'état in December 1851, the party was forcibly dissolved and its members were exiled.

== Electoral results ==
National Assembly
Election year	No. of overall votes	% of overall vote	No. of overall seats won	+/–	Leader
1848	1,802,125 (2nd)	22.7	200 / 880	New	Victor Hugo
1849	3,310,000 (1st)	50.2	450 / 705	▲250	Alexis de Tocqueville

== See also ==
- 1849 French legislative election
- List of political parties in France

== Sources ==
- Atlas Historique (1968). Stock: Paris.
