= Third cabinet of Napoleon III =

French cabinet from 1852–1869

- France; Cabinet of France
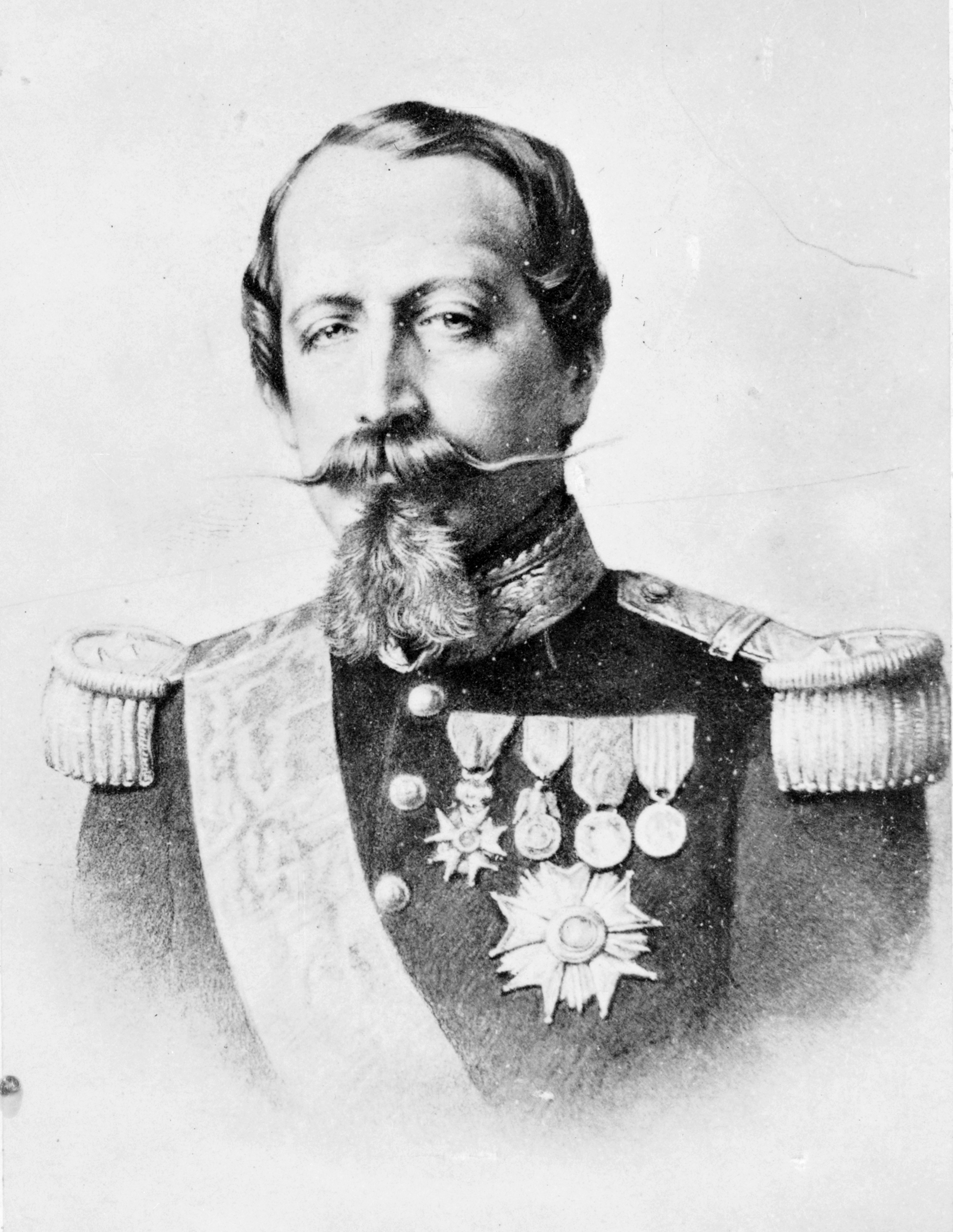
- Napoleon III
- Date formed: 2 December 1852
- Date dissolved: 17 July 1869

People and organisations
- Head of state: Napoleon III
- Head of government: Napoleon III

History
- Predecessor: Second cabinet of Louis Napoleon
- Successor: Fourth cabinet of Napoleon III

The Third cabinet of Napoleon III was formed by the Emperor Napoleon III on 2 December 1852, replacing the Second cabinet of Louis Napoleon at the start of the Second French Empire. It remained in place (with various ministerial changes) until 17 July 1869, when it was replaced by the Fourth cabinet of Napoleon III. The ministers were each accountable to Napoleon III, who was thus both head of state and head of government.

Ministerial appointments were:

Ministry	From	To	Minister
State	2 December 1852	23 November 1860	Achille Fould
State	23 November 1860	23 June 1863	Alexandre Colonna-Walewski
State	23 June 1863	18 October 1863	Adolphe Billault
State	18 October 1863	17 July 1869	Achille Fould
Justice	2 December 1852	16 November 1857	Jacques Pierre Abbatucci
Justice	16 November 1857	5 May 1859	Ernest de Royer
Justice	5 May 1859	23 June 1863	Adolphe Billault
Justice	18 October 1863	17 July 1869	Claude Alphonse Delangle
Foreign Affairs	2 December 1852	8 May 1855	Édouard Drouyn de Lhuys
Foreign Affairs	8 May 1855	4 January 1860	Alexandre Colonna-Walewski
Foreign Affairs	4 January 1860	24 January 1860	Jules Baroche (interim)
Foreign Affairs	24 January 1860	15 October 1862	Édouard Thouvenel
Foreign Affairs	15 October 1862	1 September 1866	Édouard Drouyn de Lhuys
Foreign Affairs	1 September 1866	2 October 1866	Charles de La Valette (interim)
Foreign Affairs	2 October 1866	17 December 1868	Lionel de Moustier
Foreign Affairs	17 December 1868	17 July 1869	Charles de La Valette
Interior	2 December 1852	13 June 1854	Victor de Persigny
Interior	13 June 1854	7 February 1858	Adolphe Billault
Interior	7 February 1858	14 June 1858	Charles-Marie-Esprit Espinasse
Interior	14 June 1858	5 May 1859	Claude Alphonse Delangle
Interior	5 May 1859	1 November 1859	Louis Arrighi de Casanova
Interior	1 November 1859	5 December 1860	Adolphe Billault
Interior	5 December 1860	23 June 1863	Victor de Persigny
Interior	23 June 1863	28 March 1865	Paul Boudet
Interior	28 March 1865	13 November 1867	Charles de La Valette
Interior	13 November 1867	17 December 1868	Pierre Magne
Interior	7 December 1868	17 July 1869	Adolphe de Forcade Laroquette
Beaux-Arts	2 December 1852	14 February 1853	Victor de Persigny
Beaux-Arts	14 February 1853	23 November 1860	Achille Fould
Beaux-Arts	23 November 1860	23 June 1863	Alexandre Colonna-Walewski
Beaux-Arts	23 June 1863	17 July 1869	Jean-Baptiste Philibert Vaillant
Police	2 December 1852	10 June 1853	Charlemagne de Maupas (ministry suppressed)
Finance	2 December 1852	3 February 1855	Jean-Martial Bineau
Finance	3 February 1855	26 November 1860	Pierre Magne
Finance	26 November 1860	14 November 1861	Adolphe de Forcade Laroquette
Finance	14 November 1861	20 January 1867	Achille Fould
Finance	20 January 1867	13 November 1867	Eugène Rouher
Finance	13 November 1867	17 July 1869	Pierre Magne
War	2 December 1852	11 March 1854	Jacques Leroy de Saint-Arnaud
War	11 March 1854	5 May 1859	Jean-Baptiste Philibert Vaillant
War	5 May 1859	20 January 1867	Jacques Louis Randon
War	20 January 1867	17 July 1869	Adolphe Niel
Navy and Colonies	2 December 1852	27 March 1855	Théodore Ducos
Navy and Colonies	27 March 1855	19 April 1855	Jacques Pierre Abbatucci (acting)
Navy and Colonies	19 April 1855	24 June 1858	Ferdinand-Alphonse Hamelin
Navy	24 June 1858	26 November 1860	Ferdinand-Alphonse Hamelin
Algeria and the Colonies	24 June 1858	7 March 1859	Prince Napoléon Bonaparte
Algeria and the Colonies	7 March 1859	24 March 1859	Eugène Rouher (interim)
Algeria and the Colonies	24 March 1859	24 November 1860	Prosper de Chasseloup-Laubat (interim)
Navy and Colonies	26 November 1860	20 January 1867	Prosper de Chasseloup-Laubat
Navy and Colonies	20 January 1867	17 July 1869	Charles Rigault de Genouilly
Education and Religious affairs	2 December 1852	7 June 1856	Hippolyte Fortoul
Education and Religious affairs	7 June 1856	13 August 1856	Jean-Baptiste Philibert Vaillant (interim)
Education and Religious affairs	13 August 1856	23 June 1863	Gustave Rouland
Education and Religious affairs	23 June 1863	17 July 1869	Victor Duruy
Public Works	2 December 1852	2 February 1855	Pierre Magne
Public Works	2 February 1855	23 June 1863	Eugène Rouher
Public Works	23 June 1863	20 January 1867	Louis Henri Armand Behic
Public Works	20 January 1867	17 December 1868	Adolphe de Forcade Laroquette
Public Works	17 December 1868	17 July 1869	Edmond Gressier
Agriculture and Commerce	2 December 1852	23 June 1853	Victor de Persigny
Agriculture and Commerce	23 June 1853	2 February 1855	Pierre Magne
Agriculture and Commerce	2 February 1855	23 June 1863	Eugène Rouher
Agriculture and Commerce	23 June 1863	20 January 1867	Louis Henri Armand Behic
Agriculture and Commerce	20 January 1867	17 December 1868	Adolphe de Forcade Laroquette
Agriculture and Commerce	17 December 1868	17 July 1869	Edmond Gressier
Emperor's Household	14 December 1852	23 November 1860	Achille Fould
Emperor's Household	4 December 1860	17 July 1869	Jean-Baptiste Philibert Vaillant
Minister President of the Council of State	30 December 1852	23 June 1863	Jules Baroche
Minister President of the Council of State	23 June 1863	18 October 1863	Eugène Rouher
Minister President of the Council of State	18 October 1863	28 September 1864	Gustave Rouland
Minister President of the Council of State	28 September 1864	17 July 1869	Adolphe Vuitry
Without Portfolio	26 November 1860	30 March 1863	Pierre Magne
Without Portfolio	3 December 1860	23 June 1863	Jules Baroche
Without Portfolio	5 December 1860	13 October 1863	Adolphe Billault
