= Fourth cabinet of Napoleon III =

French cabinet from 1869–1870

- Cabinet of the Second French Empire

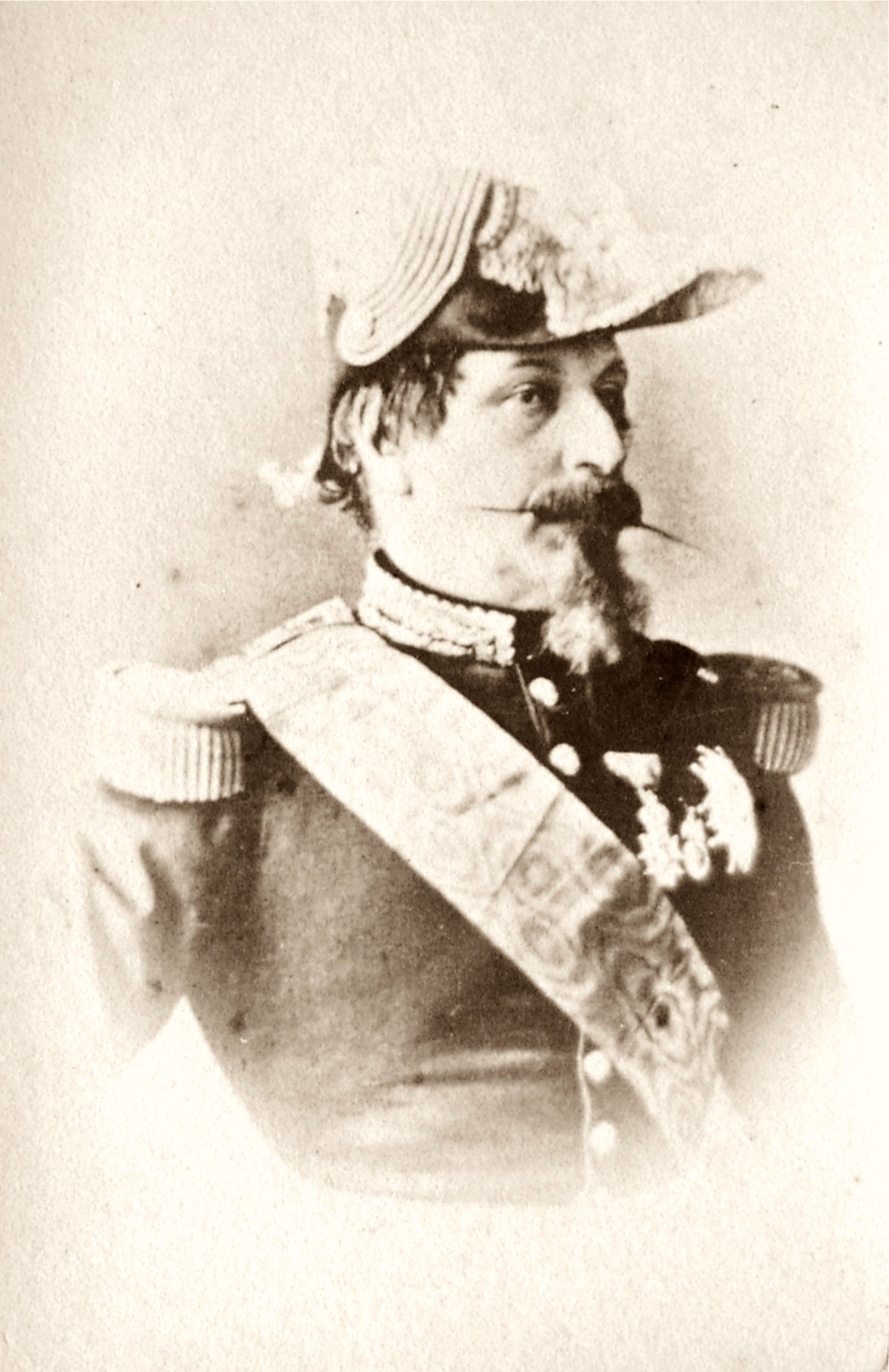
- Napoleon III
- Date formed: 17 July 1869
- Date dissolved: 2 January 1870

People and organisations
- Head of state: Napoleon III
- Head of government: Prosper de Chasseloup-Laubat

History
- Predecessor: Third cabinet of Napoleon III
- Successor: Cabinet of Émile Ollivier

The Fourth cabinet of Napoleon III was formed on 17 July 1869. It was replaced by the Émile Ollivier ministry on 2 January 1870.

== Ministers ==
The ministers were:

- President of the Council of State: Prosper de Chasseloup-Laubat
- Justice and Religious Affairs: Jean-Baptiste Duvergier
- Foreign Affairs: Henri La Tour d'Auvergne
- Interior: Adolphe de Forcade La Roquette
- Finance: Pierre Magne
- War: Adolphe Niel
- Navy and Colonies: Charles Rigault de Genouilly
- Public Education: Louis Olivier Bourbeau
- Public Works: Edmond Valléry Gressier
- Agriculture and Commerce : Alfred Le Roux
- Imperial Household and Beaux-Arts: Jean-Baptiste Philibert Vaillant

Adolphe Niel died on 21 August 1869 and was replaced as Minister of War by Edmond Le Bœuf.

== Sources ==
- Muel, Léon (1891). Gouvernements, ministères et constitutions de la France depuis cent ans: Précis historique des révolutions, des crises ministérielles et gouvernementales, et des changements de constitutions de la France depuis 1789 jusqu'en 1890 ... Marchal et Billard.
