= Second cabinet of Louis Napoleon =

French cabinet of 1852

- France; Cabinet of France
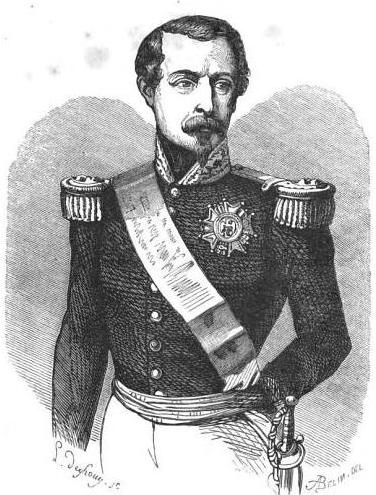
- Louis Napoleon in 1852
- Date formed: 22 January 1852
- Date dissolved: 2 December 1852

People and organisations
- Head of state: Louis Napoleon
- Head of government: Louis Napoleon

History
- Predecessor: First cabinet of Louis Napoleon
- Successor: Third cabinet of Napoleon III

The Second cabinet of Louis Napoleon was formed by President Louis-Napoleon Bonaparte on 22 January 1852, replacing the interim First cabinet of Louis Napoleon. It remained in place until the proclamation of the Second French Empire on 2 December 1852, when it was replaced by the Third cabinet of Napoleon III.

Ministry	From	To	Minister
State	22 January 1852	28 July 1852	François-Xavier Joseph de Casabianca
State	28 July 1852	2 December 1852	Achille Fould
Justice	22 January 1852	2 December 1852	Jacques Pierre Abbatucci
Foreign Affairs	22 January 1852	28 July 1852	Louis Félix Étienne, marquis de Turgot
Foreign Affairs	28 July 1852	2 December 1852	Édouard Drouyn de Lhuys
Interior and Beaux-Arts, Agriculture and Commerce	22 January 1852	25 January 1852	Victor de Persigny
Police	22 January 1852	2 December 1852	Charlemagne de Maupas
Finance	22 January 1852	2 December 1852	Jean-Martial Bineau
War	22 January 1852	2 December 1852	Jacques Leroy de Saint Arnaud
Navy and Colonies	22 January 1852	2 December 1852	Théodore Ducos
Education and Religious affairs	22 January 1852	2 December 1852	Hippolyte Fortoul
Public Works	22 January 1852	28 July 1852	Noël Lefebvre-Duruflé
Public Works	28 July 1852	2 December 1852	Pierre Magne
