= Cabinet of Napoleon =

Cabinet of Napoleon may refer to:

- First Cabinet of Napoleon I
- First cabinet of Louis Napoleon
- Second cabinet of Louis Napoleon
- Third cabinet of Napoleon III
- Fourth cabinet of Napoleon III
