= Last cabinet of the French Second Republic =

French cabinet of 1851

- France; Cabinet of France
- Date formed: 27 October 1851
- Date dissolved: 2 December 1851

People and organisations
- Head of state: Louis Napoleon

History
- Predecessor: Cabinet of Léon Faucher
- Successor: First cabinet of Louis Napoleon

The Last cabinet of the French Second Republic was formed on 27 October 1851 by President Louis-Napoleon Bonaparte after the dismissal of the Cabinet of Léon Faucher. It remained in place until the coup of 2 December 1851, when it was replaced by the First cabinet of Louis Napoleon.

== Cabinet members ==
Ministry	Start	End	Minister
War	26 October 1851	2 December 1851	General Jacques Leroy de Saint Arnaud
Justice	26 October 1851	1 November 1851	Eugène Corbin
Police	26 October 1851	2 December 1851	Charlemagne de Maupas
Foreign Affairs	26 October 1851	2 December 1851	Louis Félix Étienne, marquis de Turgot
Interior	26 October 1851	2 December 1851	René de Thorigny
Finance	26 October 1851	23 November 1851	Antoine Blondel
Navy and Colonies	26 October 1851	2 December 1851	Hippolyte Fortoul
Public Works	26 October 1851	2 December 1851	Théobald de Lacrosse
Agriculture and Commerce	26 October 1851	26 November 1851	François-Xavier Joseph de Casabianca
Education and Religious Affairs	26 October 1851	2 December 1851	Charles Giraud
Justice	1 November 1851	2 December 1851	Alfred Daviel
Finance	23 November 1851	2 December 1851	François-Xavier Joseph de Casabianca
Agriculture and Commerce	26 November 1851	2 December 1851	Noël Lefebvre-Duruflé
Interior	2 December 1851	2 December 1851	Charles de Morny, Duke of Morny

== Sources ==
- Burke, Edmund (1885). The Annual Register. Rivingtons.
- Fay, Theodore Sedgwick (1889). The Three Germany's: Glimpses Into Their History. Pub. for the author. p. 1063.
- "Foreign News: France". The Gentleman's Magazine and Historical Review. Bradbury, Evans. 1851. p. 528.
- Robert, Adolphe; Cougny, Gaston (1889). "Xavier, François, Joseph DE CASABIANCA". Dictionnaire des parlementaires français de 1789 à 1889 (in French). National Assembly of France.
- Robert, Adolphe; Cougny, Gaston (1889b). "Lefebvre-Duruflé (Noël Jacques)". Dictionnaire des parlementaires français de 1789 à 1889. National Assembly of France.
- Robert, Adolphe; Cougny, Gaston (1889c). "Bertrand, Théobald, Joseph LACROSSE". Dictionnaire des parlementaires français de 1789 à 1889 (in French). National Assembly of France.
- Vaisse, Pierre (5 December 2008). "FORTOUL, Hippolyte". INHA. Archived from the original on 14 January 2014.
