= First cabinet of Louis Napoleon =

French cabinet from 1851–1852

- France; Cabinet of France
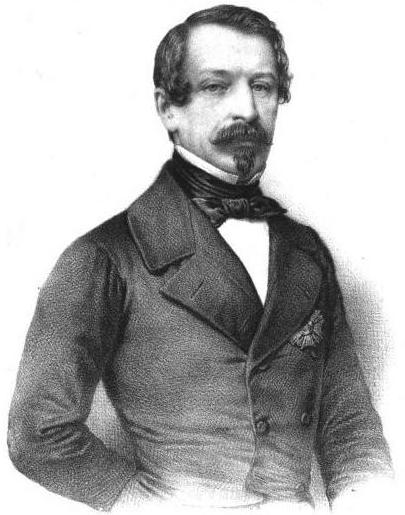
- Louis Napoleon in 1852
- Date formed: 3 December 1851
- Date dissolved: 22 January 1852

People and organisations
- Head of state: Louis Napoleon
- Head of government: Louis Napoleon

History
- Predecessor: Last cabinet of the French Second Republic
- Successor: Second cabinet of Louis Napoleon

The First cabinet of Louis Napoleon was formed by President Louis-Napoleon Bonaparte the day after the coup of 2 December 1851, replacing the Last cabinet of the French Second Republic. It was replaced by the Second cabinet of Louis Napoleon on 22 January 1852. The ministers were:

- Justice : Eugène Rouher
- Foreign Affairs: Louis Félix Étienne, marquis de Turgot
- Interior and Beaux-Arts: Charles de Morny, Duke of Morny
- Finance : Achille Fould
- War: Jacques Leroy de Saint Arnaud
- Navy and Colonies: Théodore Ducos
- Education and Religious Affairs: Hippolyte Fortoul
- Public Works: Pierre Magne
- Agriculture and Commerce: Lefebvre-Duruflé
