= Delangle =

Delangle may refer to:

- Claude Delangle, French classical saxophonist
- Claude Alphonse Delangle (6 April 1797 – 25 December 1869), French magistrate and politician
- Mariette Hélène Delangle (15 December 1900 – 1 October 1984), French model, dancer and racing car driver
