= Château Malromé =

Château in Nouvelle-Aquitaine, France

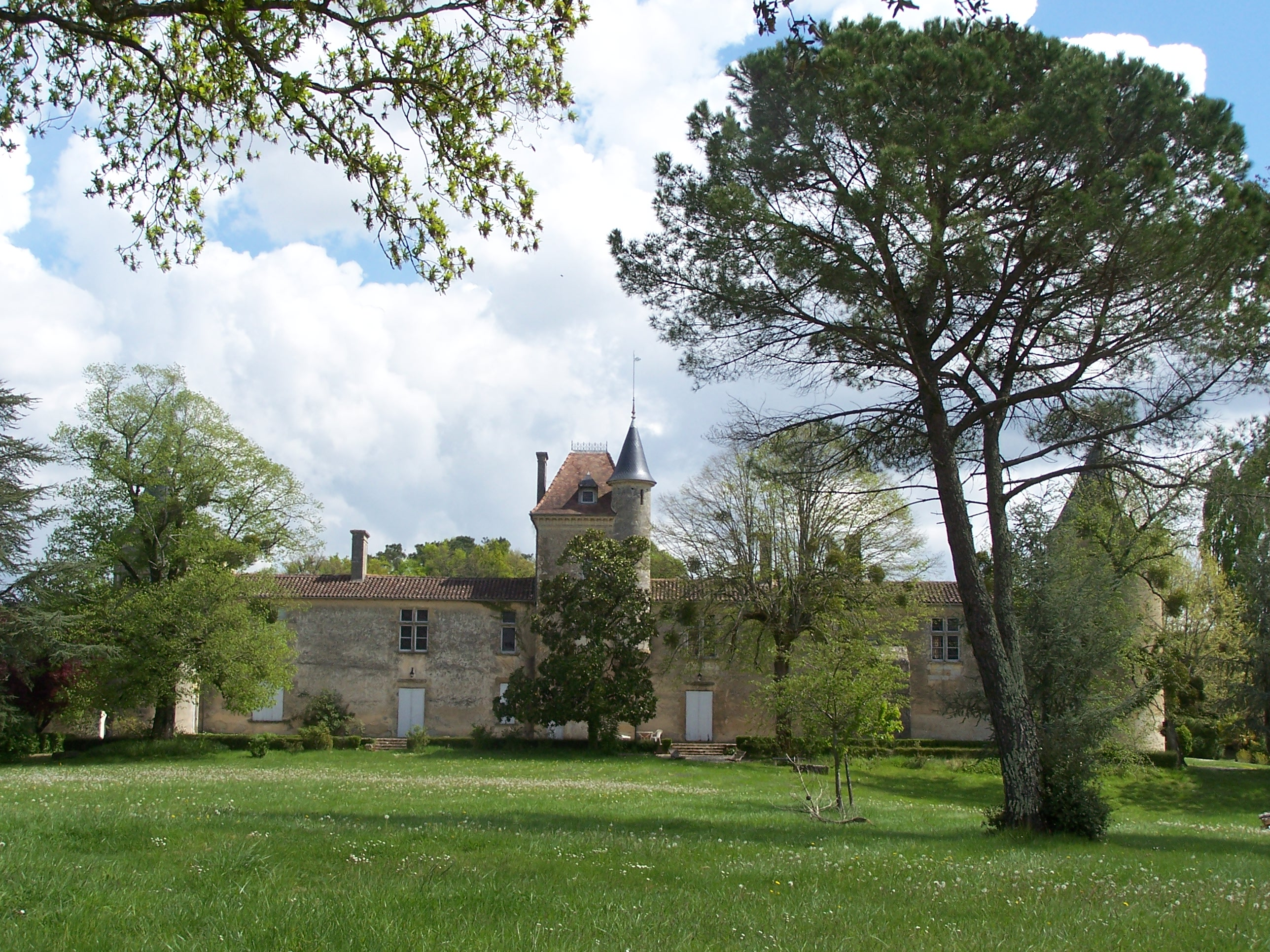
- Château Malromé

General information
- Coordinates: 44.6025°N 0.213333°W

The Château Malromé is located in the commune Saint-André-du-Bois, in the French department of Gironde. It became the home of the mother of the painter Henri de Toulouse-Lautrec.

== Vineyard ==
The vineyard of Malromé, which covers a surface area of around forty hectares, is situated on slopes of gravelly clay. Its soil has been renowned over the centuries.

== History ==
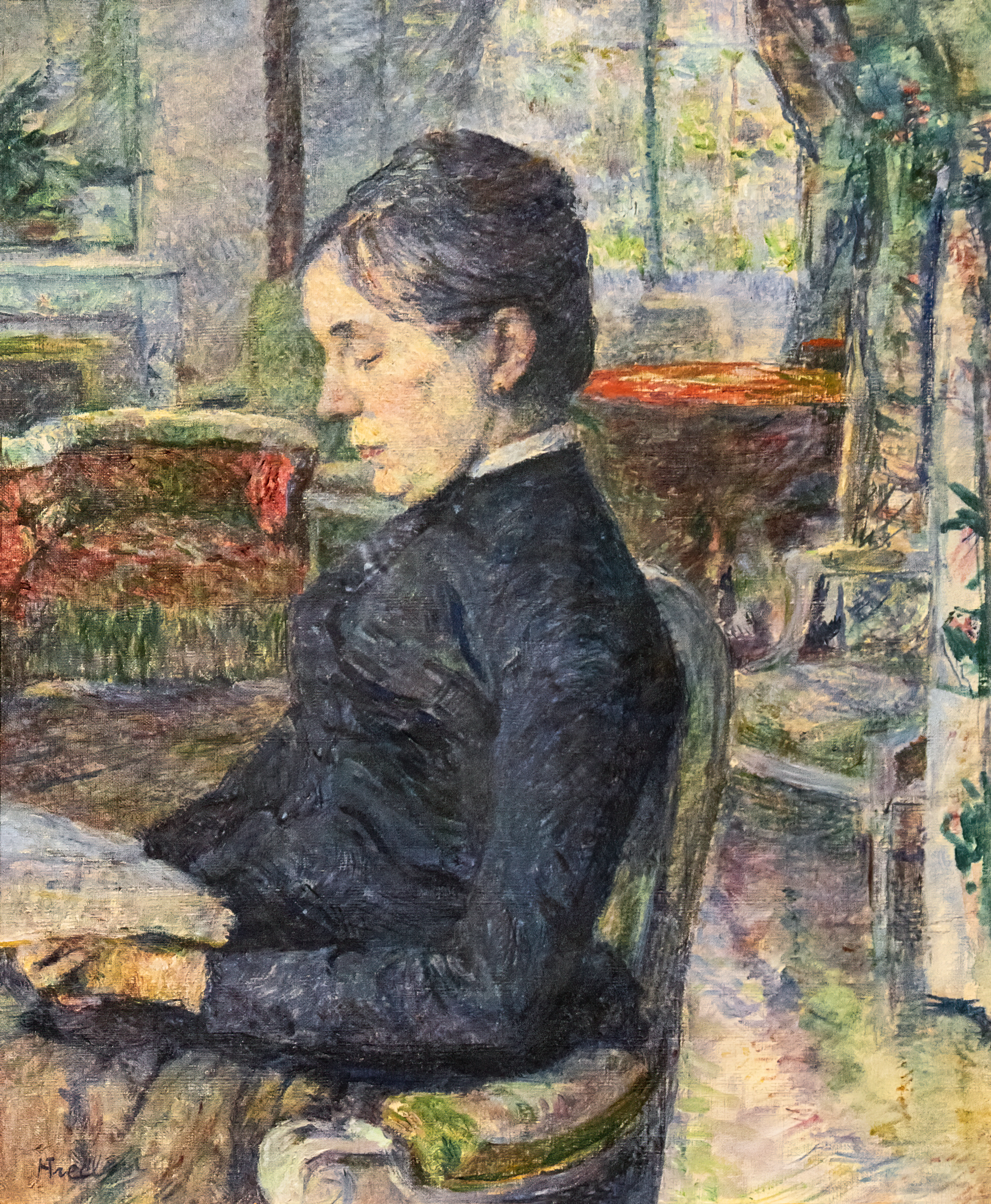
The Countess Adèle de Toulouse-Lautrec in her salon at the Château Malromé, in 1887

The first recorded occurrence of the château and its vineyard dates from the 16th century, with the construction of "a noble house of taste" by Étienne de Rostéguy de Lancre, a member of the Parliament of Bordeaux.

Towards 1780, the château passed to Catherine de Forcade, the widow of the Baron de Malromé, who renamed it in memory of her spouse.

In 1847, the château became the property of Adolphe de Forcade La Roquette, Vice-President of the Conseil d'État under Napoleon III, and his half-brother, Maréchal Armand-Jacques Leroy de Saint-Arnaud, governor of Paris and Minister of War. These two men had the château restored "in the manner of Viollet-le-Duc".

In 1883, the Countess Adèle de Toulouse-Lautrec acquired the building, attracted by its proximity to Verdelais, a nearby shrine and place of pilgrimage.

Her son, Henri de Toulouse-Lautrec, often visited the château. It was here that he died, on 9 September 1901.

== Gallery ==
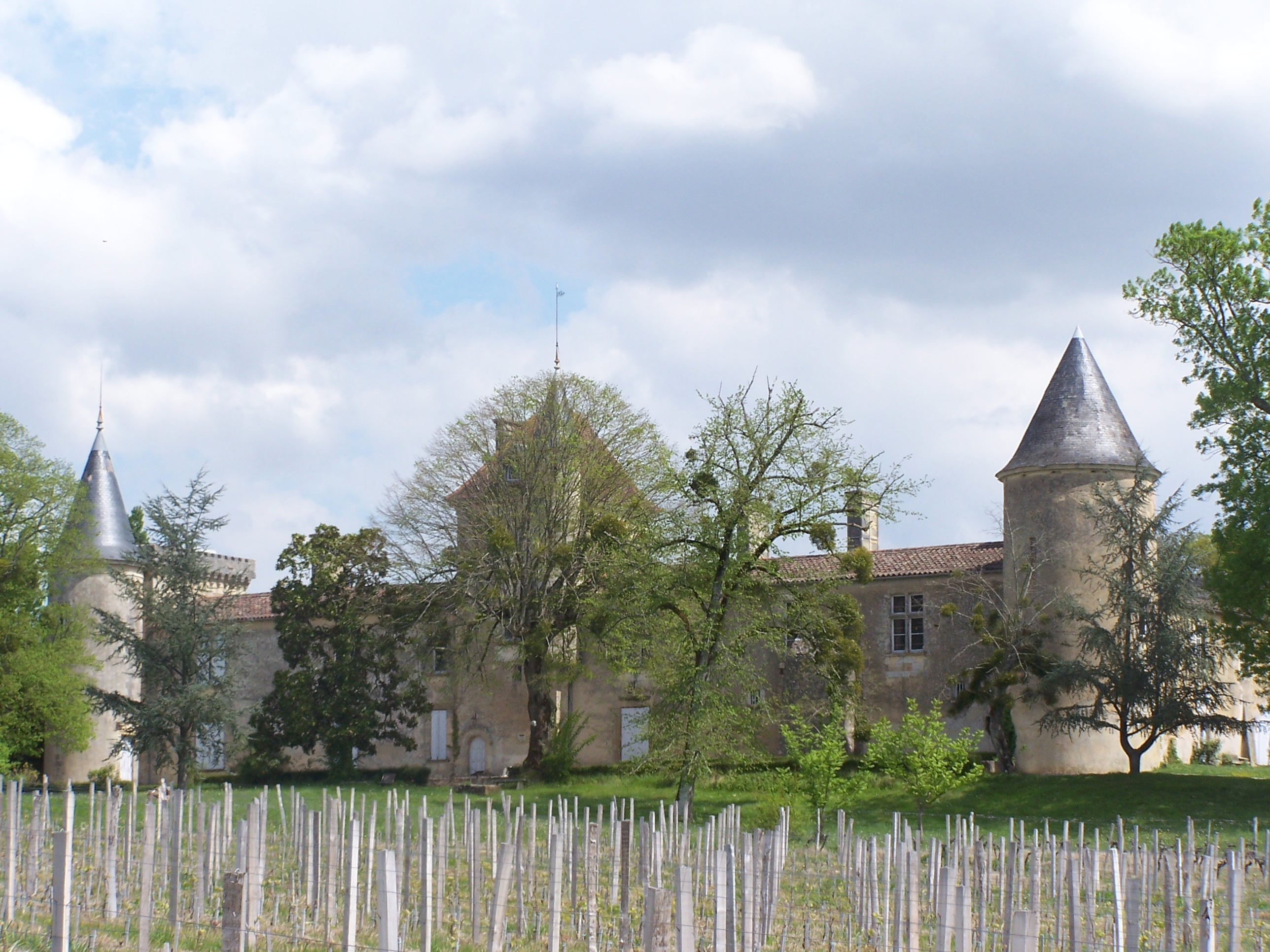

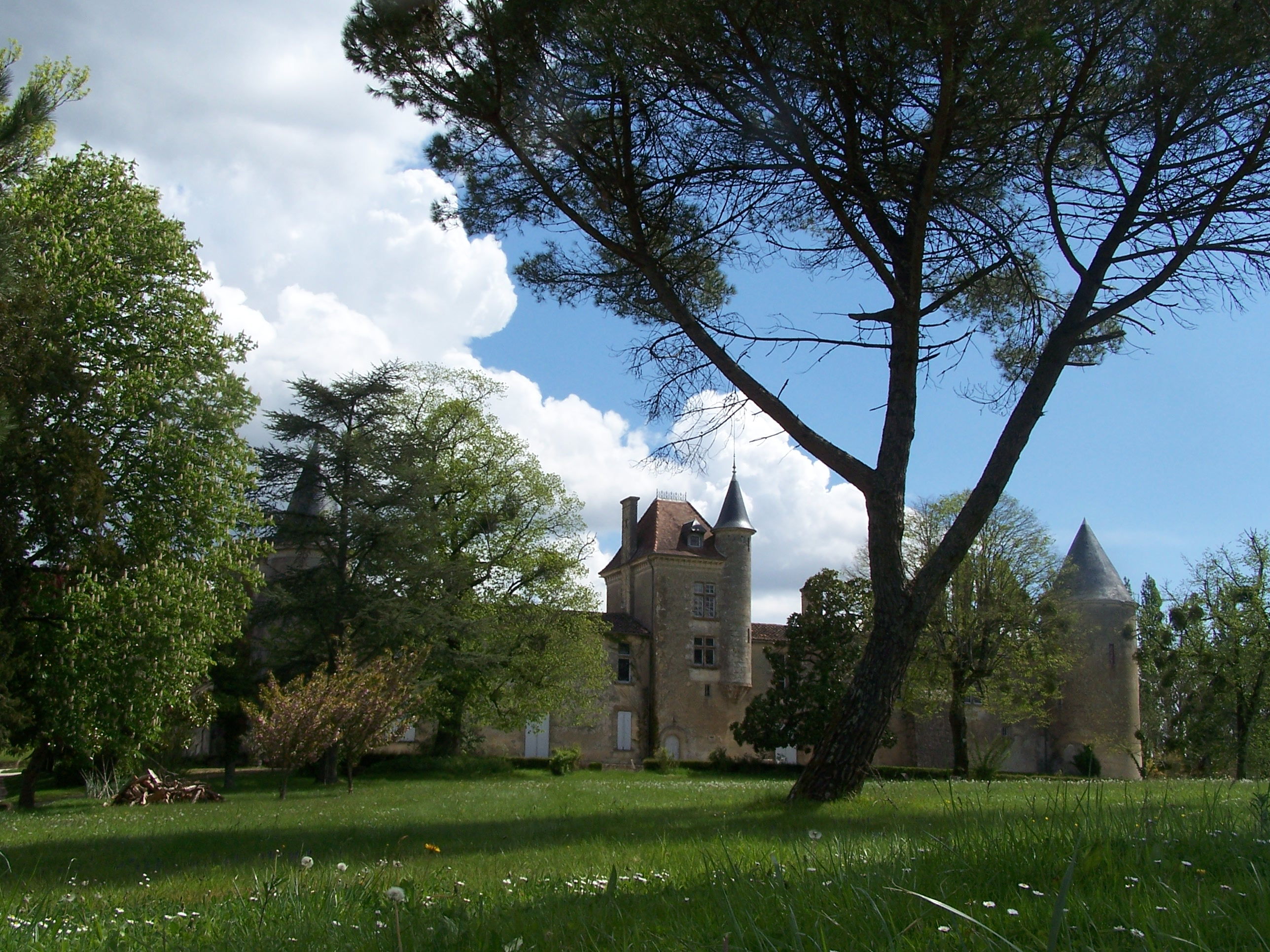
