= Józef Zaliwski =

Polish independence activist

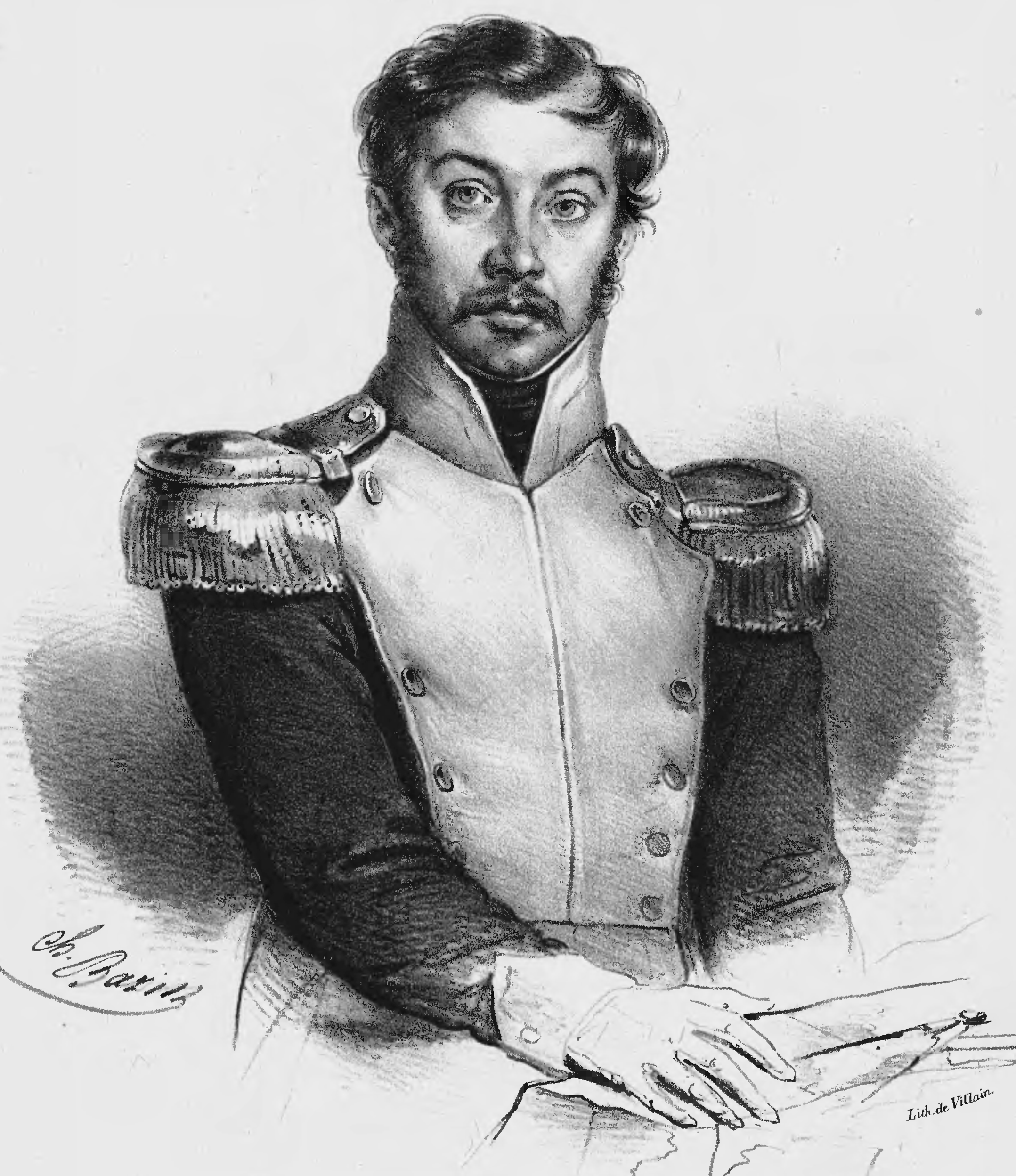
Józef Zaliwski by Charles Louis Bazin

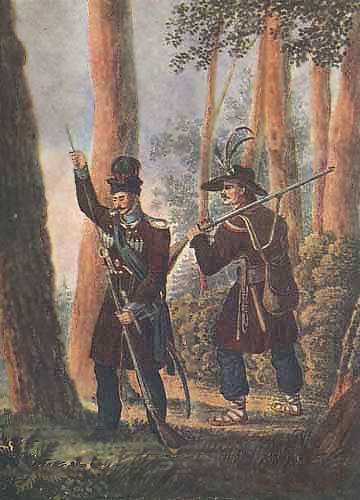
"Kurpiki ostrołęckie" of ppłk Zaliwski, c. 1831

Józef Zaliwski of Junosza coat of arms (22 March 1797 in Marijampolė or Jurbarkas – 1 April 1855 in Paris) was a Polish independence activist.

Zaliwski was a member of Wolnomularstwo Narodowe (Polish: National Freemasonry), Walerian Łukasiński's Towarzystwo Patriotyczne, Piotr Wysocki Conspiracy (Sprzysiężenie Wysockiego), co-organiser (with Joachim Lelewel) of Zemsta Ludu (1832), initiator of guerilla warfare (1833). He participated in November Uprising (1830–1831).
