= Henri, Prince de La Tour d'Auvergne-Lauraguais =

French politician

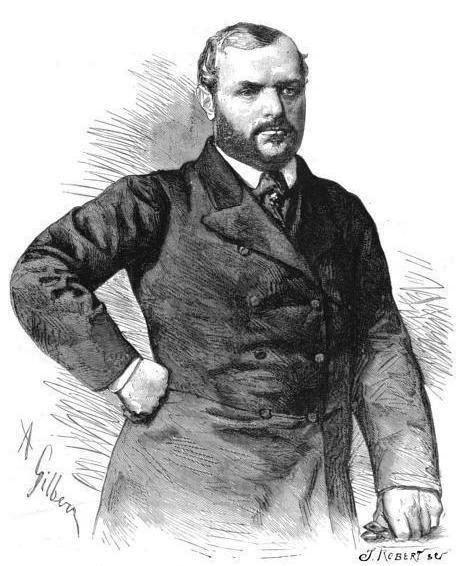
Henri, prince de La Tour d'Auvergne (1869)

De La Tour d'Auvergne's patrilineal arms

Henri-Godefroi-Bernard-Alphonse, 1st Prince de La Tour d'Auvergne, 2nd Marquis de Saint-Paulet (21 October 1823 – 5 May 1871) was a French politician of the Second Empire who twice served as Minister of Foreign Affairs for Emperor Napoleon III.

De La Tour d'Auvergne was Ambassador of France to London (1863–69), in which capacity he was a signatory to the Treaty of London in 1867.

== Personal life ==
He was the son of Melchior de La Tour d'Auvergne-Lauraguais (1794–1849), 1st Marquess of Saint-Paulet and 2nd Baron of the Empire, and Laurence de Chauvigny de Blot.

He was married to Emilie Céleste Montault des Illes (1822–1857), daughter of Charles Montault des Illes and Emilie Adélaïde Bertrand. His only son was:

- Charles-Laurent-Bernard-Godefroi de La Tour d'Auvergne-Lauraguais (1852–1903), 2nd Prince de La Tour d'Auvergne-Lauraguais, 3rd Marquess of Saint-Paulet and 4th Baron of the Empire. Married in 1875 to Marie Léontine Ysoré d'Hervault de Pleumartin, daughter of Anne Antoine Ysoré d'Hervault, 7th Marquis de Pleumartin, and Césarine de Gars de Courcelles. He had three children:
  - Henri de La Tour d'Auvergne-Lauraguais (1876–1914), 3rd Prince de La Tour d'Auvergne-Lauraguais, 4th Marquess of Saint-Paulet and 5th Baron of the Empire. Married in 1904 to Elisabeth Berthier de Wagram (1885–1960), daughter of Alexandre Berthier, 3rd Prince of Wagram (grandson of Louis-Alexandre Berthier) and Bertha Clara von Rothschild (daughter of Mayer Carl, Baron von Rothschild).
  - Charles de La Tour d'Auvergne-Lauraguais (1877–1940)
  - Césarine de La Tour d'Auvergne-Lauraguais (1879–1947)

== Ancestry ==
Ancestors of Henri, Prince de La Tour d'Auvergne-Lauraguais

8. Gabriel de La Tour de Saint-Paulet, Seigneur de Saint-Paulet
4. Joseph de La Tour d'Auvergne-Lauraguais (1767-1841), 1st Baron de l'Empire
9. Marie Angelique d'Aumale
2. Melchior de La Tour d'Auvergne-Lauraguais (1794-1849), 1st Marquis de Saint-Paulet and 2nd Baron de l'Empire
10. Louis-Philippe de Rigaud, Marquis de Vaudreuil
5. Marie Louise de Rigaud de Vaudreuil
11. Madeleine Pétronille de Roquefort de Marquein
1. Godefroi, 1st Prince de La Tour d'Auvergne-Lauraguais
12. Sébastien de Chauvigny de Blot
6. Paul Louis de Chauvigny de Blot
13. Marie-Anne de La Boulaye
3. Laurence de Chauvigny de Blot
14. Paul Jean Geffroy de Villeblanche
7. Louise Antoinette de Villeblanche
15. Louise Gaëtane de Quelen

== Honours and titles ==
- Marquis de France (succeeded his father in the marquisate of Saint-Paulet, 1849)
- Grand-croix, Légion d'honneur
- Knight, Order of Malta
- Knight, Order of Pius IX
- Knight, Saxe-Ernestine House Order
- Knight Grand Cross, Order of the Red Eagle
- Knight Commander, Order of the Two Sicilies
- Knight Commander, Order of St. Gregory the Great
- Knight of the Order of the Gold Lion of the House of Nassau

== See also ==
- House of La Tour d'Auvergne
- List of Ambassadors of France to the United Kingdom

Political offices
Preceded by Marquis de La Valette	Minister of Foreign Affairs; 17 July 1869 – 2 January 1870	Succeeded by Comte Daru
Preceded by Duc de Gramont	Minister of Foreign Affairs; 10 August - 4 September 1870	Succeeded by Jules Favre
