= Antoine Blondel =

French politician

Antoine Philippe Léon Blondel
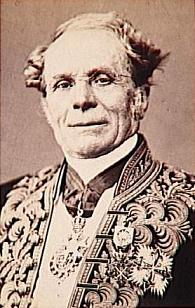
- Born: 16 November 1795; Paris, France
- Died: 27 April 1886 (aged 90); Paris, France
- Occupation: Politician
- Known for: Minister of Finance

Antoine Philippe Léon Blondel (16 November 1795 – 27 April 1886) was a French politician who was briefly Minister of Finance in the last cabinet of the French Second Republic.

== Life ==
Antoine Léon Philippe Blondel was born in Paris on 16 November 1795. He followed an administrative career. During the July Monarchy he was made a knight of the Legion of Honour on 1 January 1834, officer on 12 March 1837 and commander on 14 April 1844. In 1844 he was a counselor of state and director general of the forest administration.

Blondel was appointed Minister of Finance on 26 October 1851. On 23 November 1851 François-Xavier Joseph de Casabianca was transferred from the ministry of Agriculture to that of Finance. In the Second French Empire Blondel was a counselor of state from 1854 until 8 October 1866. On 5 March 1866 he entered the imperial senate, where he sat until 4 September 1870 among the most devoted supporters of the regime. He died in Paris on 27 April 1886 at the age of 90.
