= Ernest Pinard =

French statesman (1822-1909)

Pierre Ernest Pinard
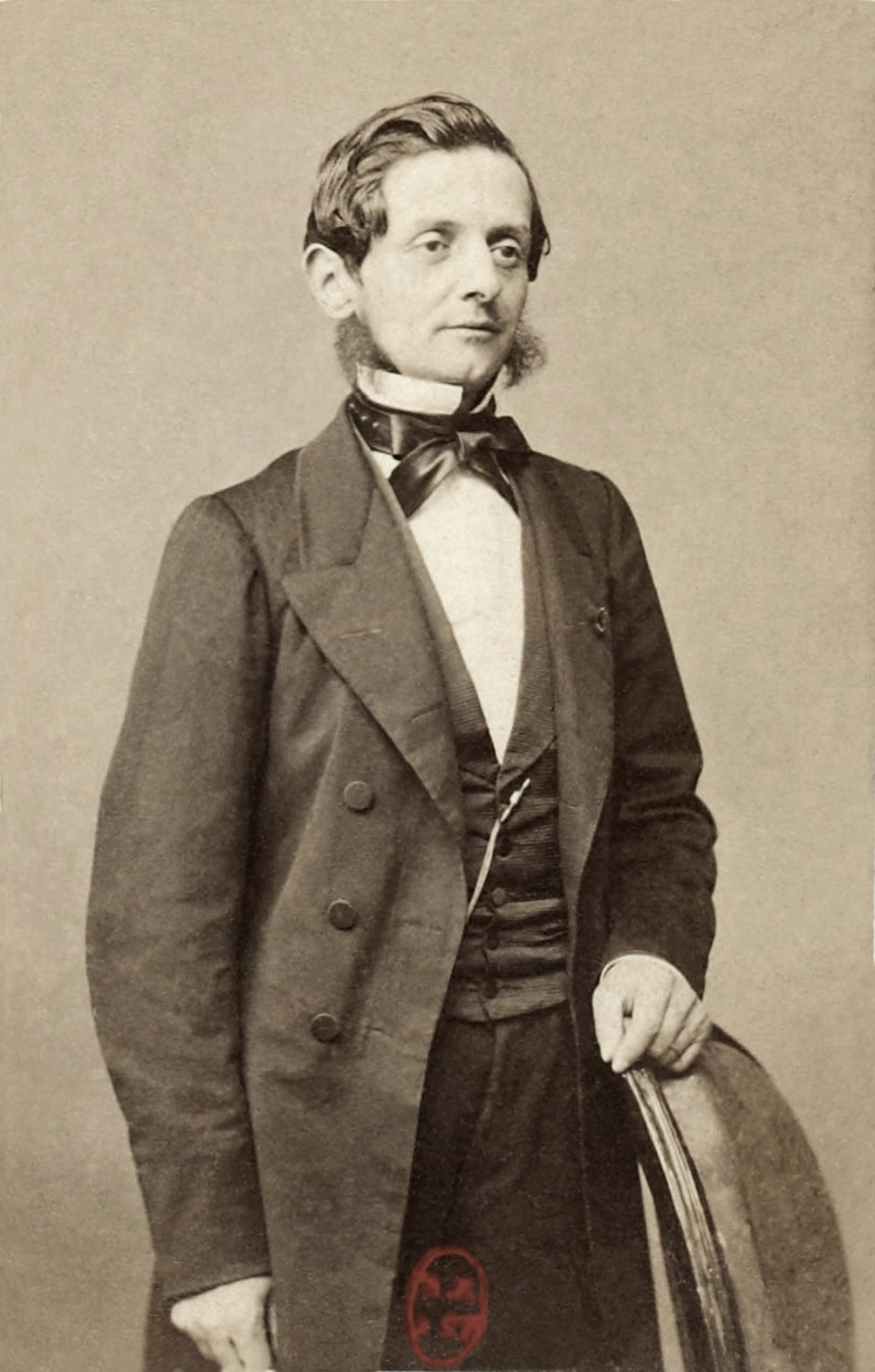
- Ernest Pinard by Bayard and Bertall
- Born: 10 October 1822; Autun, Saône-et-Loire, France
- Died: 12 September 1909 (aged 86); Bourg-en-Bresse, Ain, France
- Occupation: Politician

Pierre Ernest Pinard (10 October 1822 – 12 September 1909) was a French prosecutor and Minister of the Interior. He is known for his indictments against Gustave Flaubert's Madame Bovary and Charles Baudelaire's Les Fleurs du mal.

== Early years ==
Pierre Ernest Pinard was born in Autun, Saône-et-Loire, on 10 October 1822. His father, who belonged to the judiciary, died in 1830, leaving a widow and three children. Ernest was the eldest. He was a brilliant and very pious student at the Petit-Séminaire of Autun. He went on to the Collège Stanislas de Paris. He studied law in Paris and became an advocate. Pinard decided to join the judiciary, and on 1 May 1849 was named deputy prosecutor at Tonnerre. On 12 December 1851 he became deputy prosecutor at Troyes, and then on 30 December 1852 at Reims. On 30 October 1853 he was appointed deputy prosecutor at the Tribunal of the Seine in Paris, where he showed his remarkable talent as an orator.

In January 1857 Pinard prosecuted Gustave Flaubert for "offense to public and religious morality and to good morals" for his 1856 novel Madame Bovary, which deals with adultery. He said that "Art that observes no rule is no longer art; it is like a woman who disrobes completely. To impose the one rule of public decency on art is not to subjugate it but to honor it". Pinard failed to win a conviction, although Flaubert was reprimanded by the court. In August 1857 Pinard prosecuted Charles Baudelaire for his 1857 collection of poems, Les Fleurs du Mal. Seven of the poems were banned due to their lesbian or sadomasochistic themes, a ban that technically remained in place until 1948.

In April 1859 Pinard was named deputy prosecutor at the imperial court, and on 3 October 1861 he was promoted to the grade of advocate-general, and appointed procureur general in Douai.

== Minister of the Interior ==
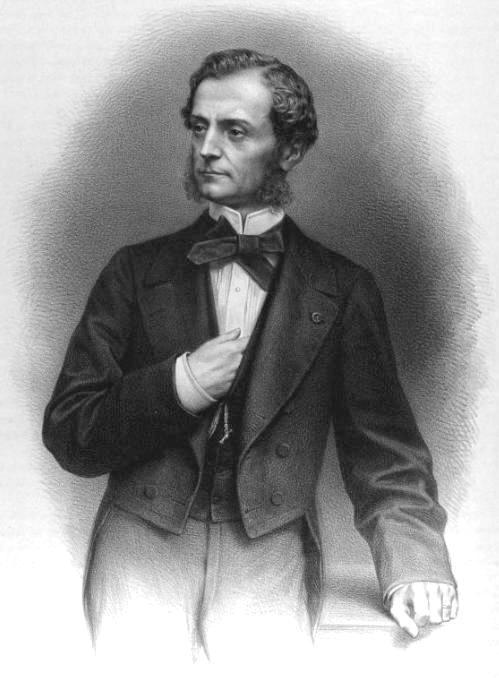
Pinard in 1867 by Antoine Samuel Adam-Salomon

Pinard was appointed to the Conseil d'Etat (Council of State) in 1866, aged 44, seen as one of the new men who could rejuvenate the empire. He was appointed Minister of the Interior on 13 November 1867, replacing Charles de La Valette. Pinard was not well liked by Eugène Rouher, the principal minister of the regime. Although attached to the Catholic Church, Pinard saw that the empire needed to become more liberal. He was in favor of a broad union between ultramontane Catholics who disagreed with imperial policy towards Rome and Bonapartists who supported reform, a combination that was opposed by Rouher.

Pinard drafted a new press law in which prison sentences were replaced by fines, and pushed it through against opposition from Rouher. However, Pinard remained authoritarian in temperament. He demanded firm action in a case against the journal La Lanterne. He made a clumsy attempt to use force to suppress a demonstration commemorating the death of Jean-Baptiste Baudin, which destroyed his authority. Pinard left office on 17 December 1868.

== Later career ==
Pinard would not accept a Senate seat. In 1869 he was elected deputy for the 7th circonscription of the Nord department. He was one of the small minority that protested the deposition of the emperor Napoleon III after the French lost the Battle of Sedan. He was imprisoned in 1871 for his Bonapartist activities. Pinard returned to the bar of Paris. In 1876 he ran unsuccessfully for election as a deputy. He died on 12 September 1909 in Bourg-en-Bresse, Ain, aged 86.
