= Charles-Louis Bazin =

French painter

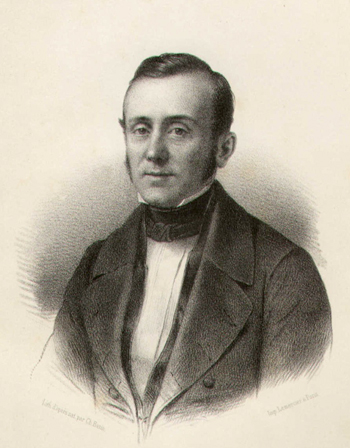
Portrait of French politician Adolphe Billault.

Charles-Louis Bazin, a French painter, sculptor, engraver, and lithographer, was born in Paris in 1802, where he died in 1859. He was a pupil of Girodet-Trioson and of Gérard, after the latter of whom he engraved a portrait of Albertine de Stael, Duchesse de Broglie.

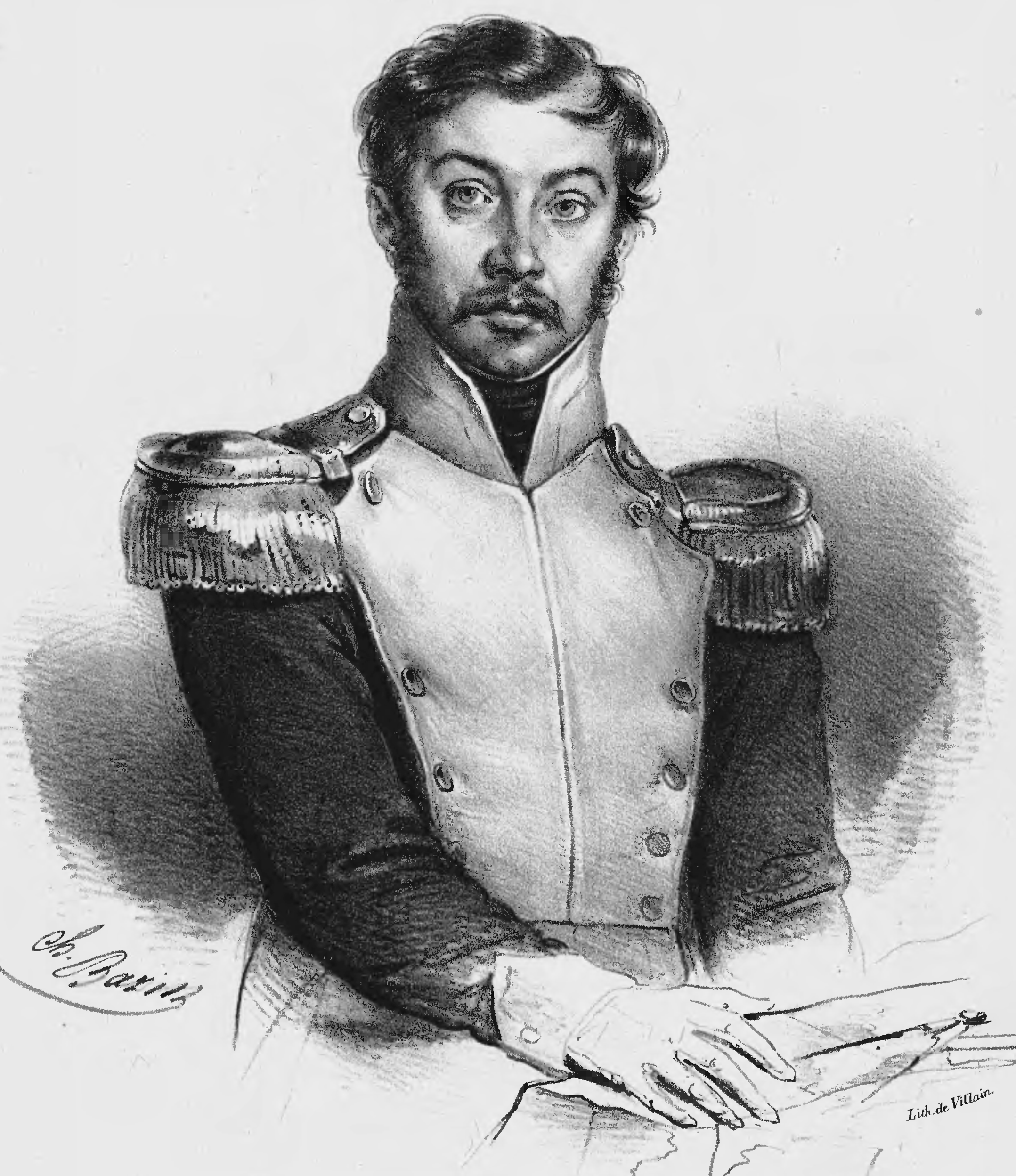
Portrait of Józef Zaliwski, Polish officer.
