= Jean Gilbert Victor Fialin, duc de Persigny =

French statesman (1808–1872)

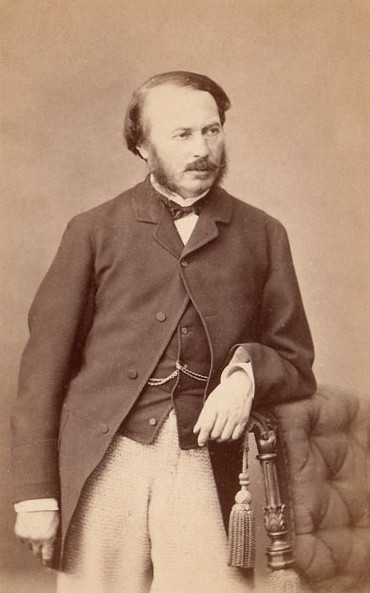
Fialin (later Duke of Persigny), 1850

Jean-Gilbert Victor Fialin, Duc de Persigny (11 January 1808 – 12 January 1872) was a statesman of the Second French Empire.

== Biography ==
Fialin was born at Saint-Germain-Lespinasse in the Loire, where his father was Receiver of Taxes, and was educated at Limoges. He entered Saumur Cavalry School in 1826, becoming Maréchal des logis in the 4th Hussars two years later. The role played by his regiment in the July Revolution of 1830 was regarded as insubordination, resulting in Fialin being dismissed from the army. He then became a journalist, and after 1833, a strong Bonapartist, assuming the style vicomte de Persigny, said to be dormant in his family.

He was involved in the abortive Bonapartist coups at Strasbourg in 1836 and at Boulogne-sur-Mer in 1840. After the second coup, he was arrested and condemned to twenty years' imprisonment in a fortress, commuted to mild detention at Versailles. There he wrote a book to prove that the Egyptian pyramids were built to prevent the Nile from silting up. The book was published in 1845 under the title De la destination et de l'utilité permanente des Pyramides.

During the 1848 Revolution, Fialin was arrested by the Provisional Government. After his release, he played a prominent part in securing Prince Louis-Napoleon Bonaparte's election to the presidency. Together with Charles de Morny (Bonaparte's half-brother) and Marshal Saint Arnaud he plotted the Restoration of the Empire and was a devoted adherent of Napoleon III. He succeeded Morny as French Minister of the Interior in January 1852 and became senator later that year. He resigned in 1854, and was appointed Ambassador to the United Kingdom the next year, a post he occupied with a short interval (1858–1859) until 1860, when he resumed the portfolio at the Interior Ministry. But the growing influence of his rival Eugène Rouher prompted his resignation in 1863, after which Napoleon created him a duke.

A more dangerous enemy than Rouher was Empress Eugénie, whose marriage Fialin had opposed and whose presence on the Council he deprecated in a memorandum which was leaked to the Empress.

He sought in vain to see Napoleon before the Franco-Prussian War in 1870, and the breach was further widened when the master and servant were in exile. Persigny returned to France in 1871 and died in Nice on 12 January 1872.

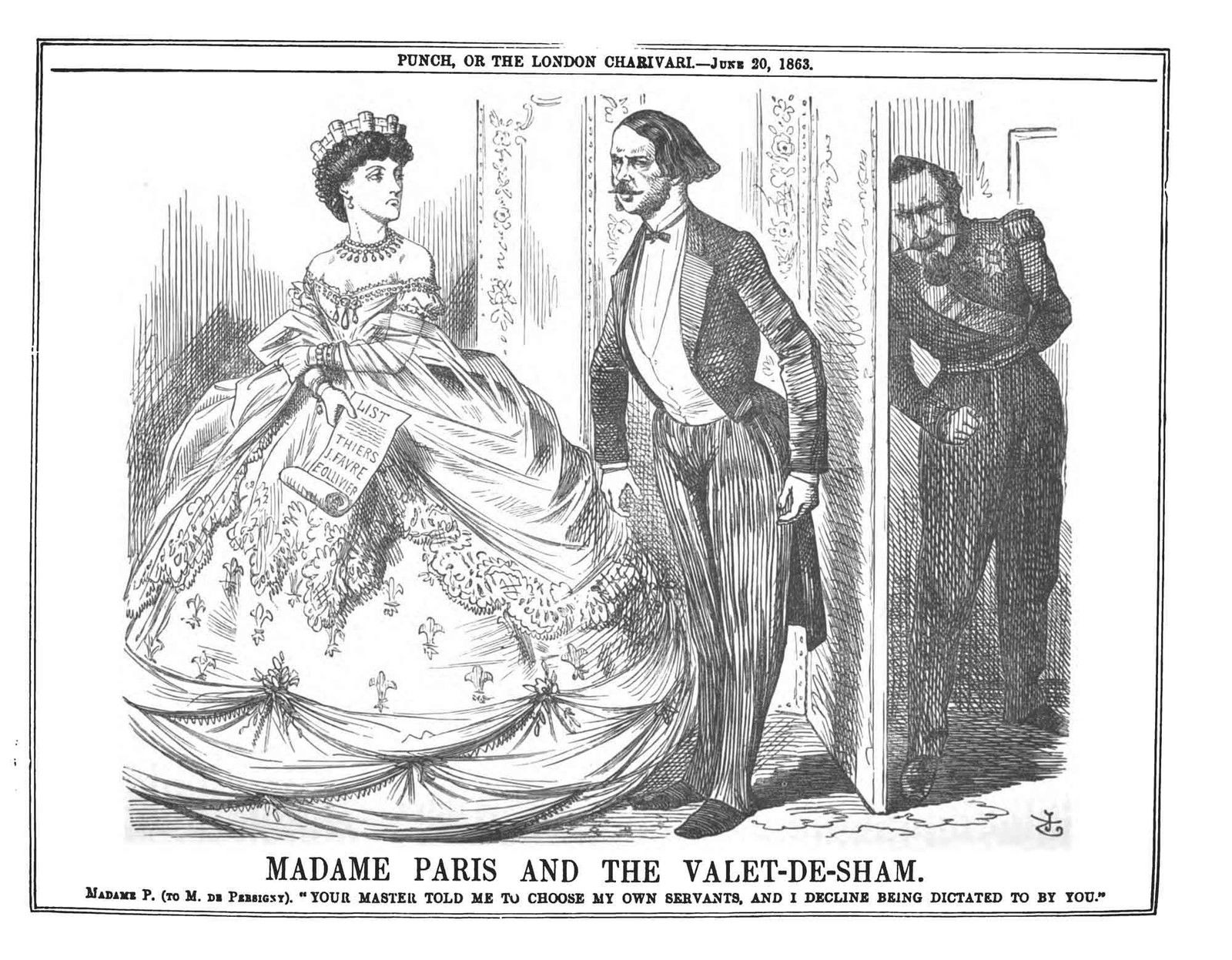
Madame Paris, with a list of names (Thiers, J. Favre, E. Ollivier) in her hand, said to Duc de Persigny: "Your master (Napoleon III) told me to choose my own servants, and I decline being dictated to by you."

A devoted and fanatical follower of Louis-Napoleon, whose service dated back to the future Emperor's wilderness years of exile and imprisonment, Persigny stood out among the Emperor's motley political entourage as the most passionate ideologue of Bonapartism. The Emperor's famous wry comment: "The Empress is a Legitimist, Morny is an Orleanist, Prince Napoleon is a Republican, and I myself am a Socialist. There is only one Bonapartist, Persigny – and he is mad!"

Political offices
Preceded by Charles Auguste, duc de Morny	Minister of the Interior; 1852–1854	Succeeded by Adolphe Billault
Preceded by Adolphe Billault	Minister of the Interior; 1860–1863	Succeeded by Paul Boudet
