= Charles, marquis de La Valette =

French politician and diplomat

Charles de La Valette
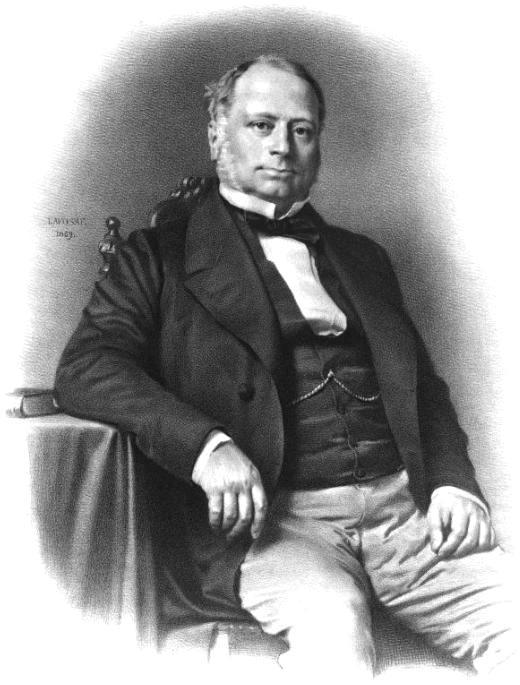

French Ambassador to the United Kingdom
- In office 1869–1870
- Preceded by: Henri, Prince de La Tour d'Auvergne-Lauraguais
- Succeeded by: Philippe de Rohan-Chabot

Minister of Foreign Affairs
- In office 17 December 1868 – 17 July 1869
- Preceded by: Lionel de Moustier
- Succeeded by: Henri, Prince de La Tour d'Auvergne-Lauraguais
- In office 1 September 1866 – 2 October 1866
- Preceded by: Édouard Drouyn de Lhuys
- Succeeded by: Lionel de Moustier

Minister of the Interior
- In office 28 March 1865 – 13 November 1867
- Preceded by: Paul Boudet
- Succeeded by: Ernest Pinard

Personal details
- Born: Charles Jean Marie Félix de La Valette; 25 November 1806; Senlis, Oise, France
- Died: 2 May 1881 (aged 74); Paris, France
- Spouses: Maria Garrow Birkett (m. 1828; died 1831) Adeline Fowle Welles (m. 1842; died 1869) Georgiana-Gabrielle de Flahaut (m. 1871)

Charles Jean Marie Félix, marquis de La Valette (25 November 1806 – 2 May 1881) was a French politician and diplomat.

== Career ==
Charles de La Valette was Minister of the Interior and of Foreign Affairs in the government of Emperor Napoleon III.

He was French Ambassador to Constantinople from 1851–53, before the Crimean War, then served as a government minister, before a posting to the Vatican (an ancestral family member Jean Parisot de Valette had been Grand Master of the Order of Malta).

An Anglophile, he finally returned to London in an official capacity as French Ambassador from 1869 to 1870.

== Personal life ==
The marquis married firstly Maria Garrow Birkett at London in 1828. Maria, a daughter of the late Daniel Birkett, Esq., of Isleworth, died in 1831, aged 24.

In 1842, he married secondly to Adeline Fowle Welles (1799–1869), the widow of a Boston banker Samuel Welles, who died in 1841. After twenty-seven years of marriage, Adeline died in 1869.

He married thirdly, in 1871, Georgiana Gabrielle de Flahaut, third daughter of Charles, Comte de Flahaut and Margaret Mercer Elphinstone, and a younger sister of Emily Petty-Fitzmaurice, Marchioness of Lansdowne.

== Honours ==
- Marquis de France
- Grand-croix, Légion d'honneur
- Chevalier de Malte

== See also ==
- Famille de La Valette-Parisot

Political offices
Preceded by Paul Boudet	Minister of the Interior; 28 March 1865 – 13 November 1867	Succeeded by Ernest Pinard
Preceded by Édouard Drouyn de Lhuys	Minister of Foreign Affairs; 1 September 1866 – 2 October 1866	Succeeded by Lionel de Moustier
Preceded by Lionel de Moustier	Minister of Foreign Affairs; 17 December 1868 – 17 July 1869	Succeeded by Henri, prince de La Tour d'Auvergne
