= Adolphe Niel =

French Army general and statesman

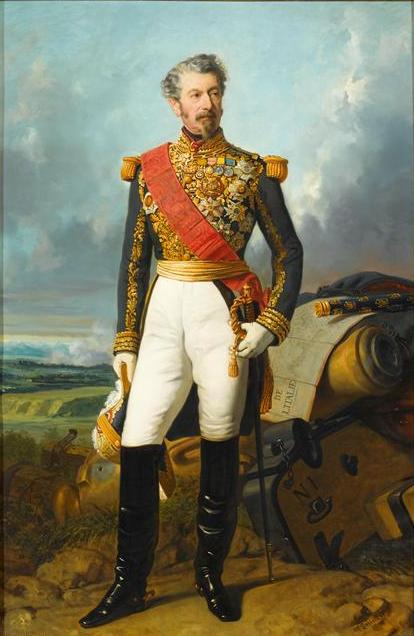
- Born: 4 October 1802; Muret, France
- Died: 13 August 1869 (aged 66); Paris, France
- Military career
- Allegiance: France
- Branch: French Army
- Service years: 1827–1869
- Rank: Marshal of France
- Commands: IV Corps, Army of Italy
- Conflicts: Crimean War; Franco-Austrian War
- Awards: Grand Cross of the Legion of Honor; Médaille militaire
- Other work: Minister of War

Adolphe Niel (French: [adɔlf njɛl]; 4 October 1802 – 13 August 1869) was a French Army general and statesman.

== Biography ==
He was born at Muret, Haute-Garonne and entered the École Polytechnique in 1821. Niel entered the engineer school at Metz, became lieutenant in the Engineers Corps in 1827, and captain in 1833. He fought in the French conquest of Algeria, participating in the storming of Constantine. There Niel led the engineer detachment with one of the storming parties, and his conduct gained for him the rank of chef de bataillon in 1837. Niel was promoted to lieutenant colonel in 1840 and to colonel in 1846. His next war service was as chief of staff to General Vaillant during the 1849 siege of Rome, after which he was made general of brigade and director of engineer services at headquarters.

In 1851, Niel became a member of the Committee of Fortifications. He became a member of the council of state in 1852 and in 1853 was promoted to general of division. In the first part of the Crimean War, Niel was employed in the expedition to the Baltic Sea and directed engineering operations against Bomarsund. Early in 1855 Niel was sent to the Crimea, where he succeeded General Michel Bizot as chief of engineers. For some years Niel had been the most trusted military adviser of Napoleon III, and he was now empowered to advise the generals on the spot in accordance with the wishes of the sovereign and the home government.

Niel managed to carry out this delicate and difficult task with as much success as could be expected, and he directed siege operations at the Battle of Malakoff. His reward was the grand cross of the Légion d'honneur. From 1855 to 1859 Niel was employed at headquarters and also served in the French Senate. In the war against the Austrians, Niel commanded the IV Corps and took part in the Battle of Magenta and the Battle of Solferino. Niel was made a marshal of France on the field at Solferino.

After he served for some years in a home command, Niel became minister of war and held the position from 1867 to 1869. In this capacity he drafted and began to carry out a far-reaching scheme of army reform, based on universal service and the automatic creation of large reserves which needed only time to mature. Under his system, those men who had purchased exemption from conscription into the army would nonetheless be called up into a new service, the Garde Mobile. He also was able to rearm the whole of the army with the chassepot rifle, but not the Garde Mobile. He did not live to complete the development of his system.

Niel died in Paris during an operation for a bladder stone, and a year later the Franco-Prussian War destroyed the old imperial army upon which the new formations were to have been grafted.

== Decorations ==
- Légion d'honneur
  - Knight (21 October 1838)
  - Officer (17 March 1845)
  - Commander (10 May 1852)
  - Grand Officer (28 August 1854)
  - Grand Cross (22 September 1855)
- Médaille militaire (4 July 1859)
- Honorary Companion of the Order of the Bath (UK)
- Honorary Knight Commander of the Order of the Bath (UK, 3 January 1856)
- Crimea Medal (UK)
- Baltic Medal (UK)
- Grand Cross of the Order of Saints Maurice and Lazarus (Sardinia)

Preceded by Jacques Louis Randon	Minister of War; 20 January 1867 – 13 August 1869	Succeeded by Charles Rigault de Genouilly
