= Saint-André-du-Bois =

- Commune
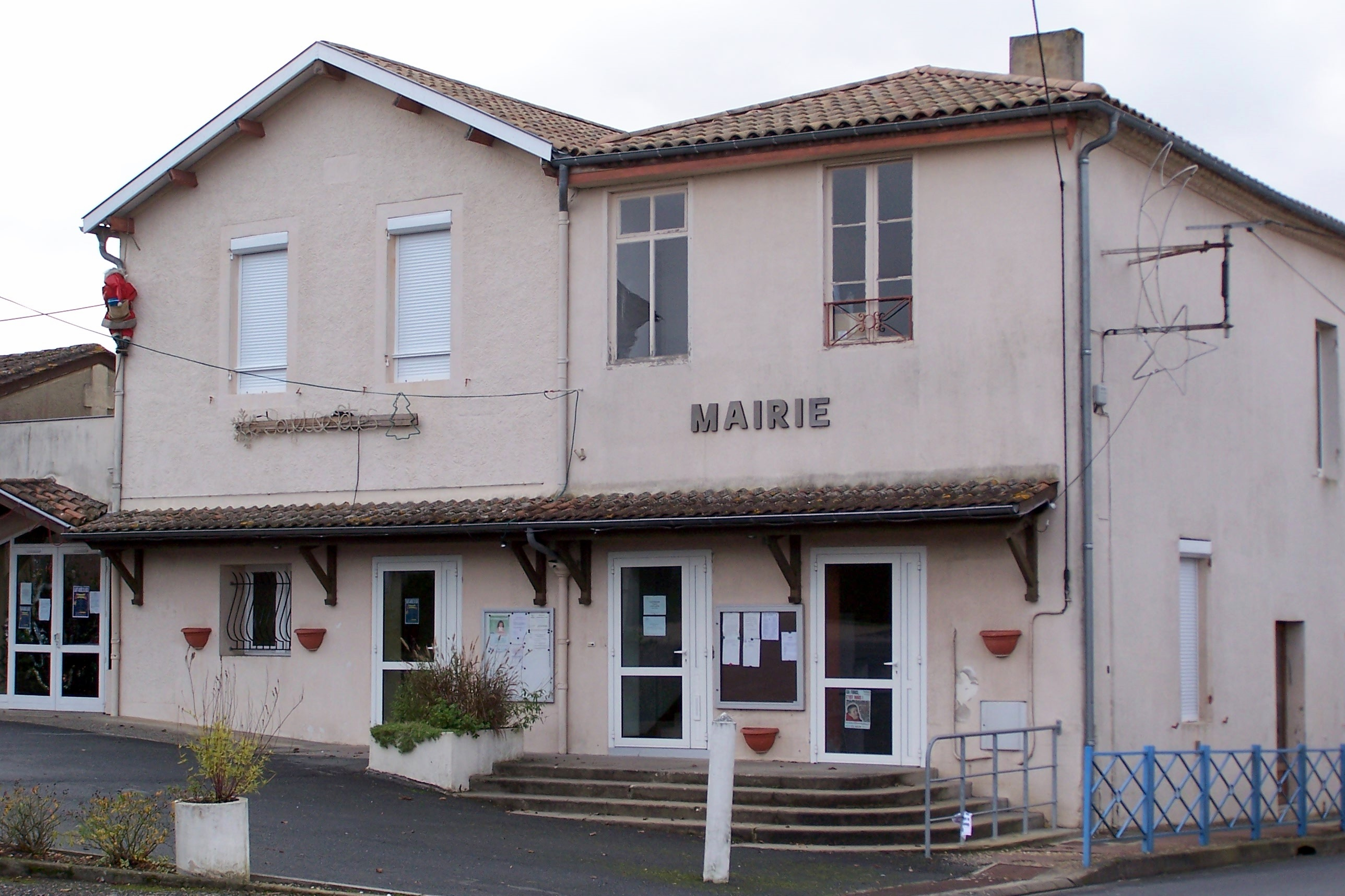
- Town hall
- Location of Saint-André-du-Bois
- Location within France Location within Nouvelle-Aquitaine
- Coordinates: 44°36′21″N 0°10′55″W
- Country: France
- Region: Nouvelle-Aquitaine
- Department: Gironde
- Arrondissement: Langon
- Canton: L'Entre-Deux-Mers

Government
  - Mayor (2020–2026): Pascale Guagni-Le Moing
- Area^{1}: 10 km^{2} (3.9 sq mi)
- Elevation: 108 m (354 ft)
- Highest elevation: 117 m (384 ft)
- Lowest elevation: 33 m (108 ft)
- Population (2023): 440
  - Density: 44/km^{2} (110/sq mi)
- Time zone: UTC+01:00 (CET)
  - Summer (DST): UTC+02:00 (CEST)
- INSEE/Postal code: 33367 /33490
- ^{1} French Land Register data, which excludes lakes, ponds, glaciers > 1 km^{2} (0.386 sq mi or 247 acres) and river estuaries.

Saint-André-du-Bois (French pronunciation: [sɛ̃.t‿ɑ̃dʁe dy bwa]; Occitan: Sant Andrieu deu Bòi) is a commune in the Gironde department in Nouvelle-Aquitaine in southwestern France.

== Population ==
Historical population
Year	Pop.	±% p.a.
1968	470	—
1975	411	−1.90%
1982	392	−0.67%
1990	421	+0.90%
1999	388	−0.90%
2007	361	−0.90%
2012	417	+2.93%
2017	434	+0.80%
2023	440	+0.23%
Source: INSEE

== See also ==
- Communes of the Gironde department
