= Paul Boudet =

French politician

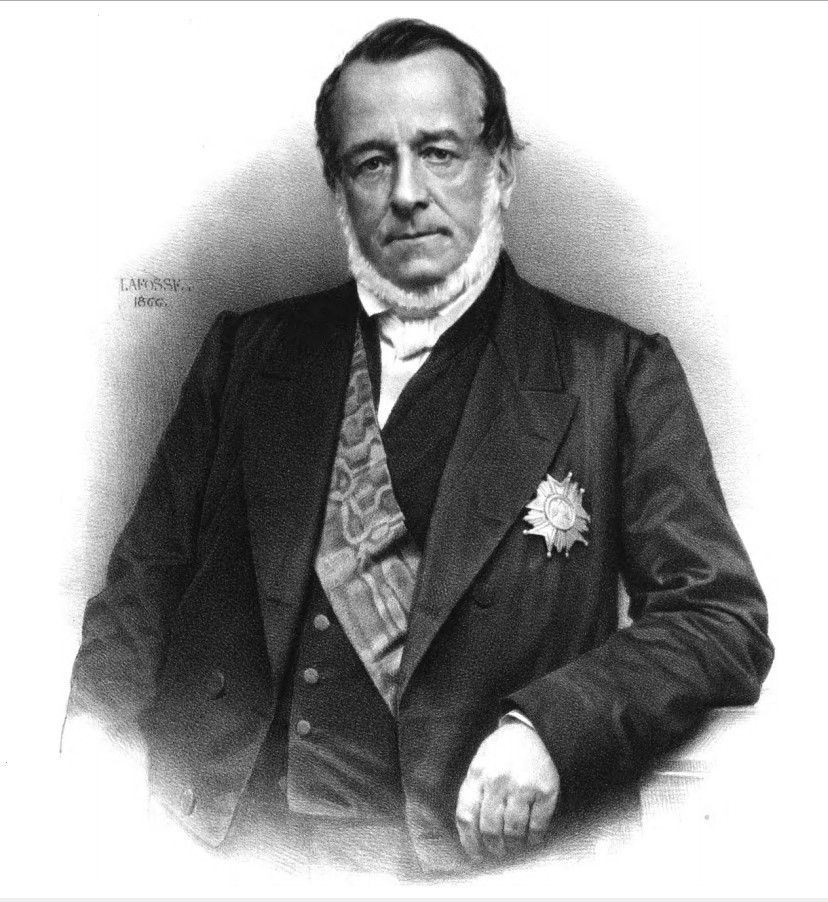
- Paul Boudet as Minister

Minister of the Interior
- In office 1863–1865

Personal details
- Born: 13 November 1800 Laval, Mayenne, France
- Died: 17 November 1877 (aged 77) Paris, France
- Occupation: Politician, lawyer
- Known for: Minister of the Interior

Paul Boudet (13 November 1800 – 17 November 1877) was a French lawyer and politician who was Minister of the Interior from 1863 to 1865.

== Life ==
Paul Boudet was born in Laval, Mayenne on 13 November 1800. He was admitted to the bar of Paris in 1821. He was an intern in the office of the elder Dupin. Having joined the Carbonari, he became an enthusiastic supporter of the July Monarchy. On 4 February 1834, he was elected to represent Laval, the first constituency of Mayenne. The next June he failed to be reelected, but in September that year was elected for the second constituency of Mayenne. He was again elected on 4 November 1837 and on 2 March 1839.

On 12 May 1839, Boudet was named Secretary-General of the Ministry of Justice and Councilor of State by Jean-Baptiste Teste, the Minister of Justice. He ran for reelection and was confirmed in the post on 29 June 1839. He remained in this post under the ministry of Adolphe Thiers. When the Thiers government fell, he returned to the opposition. On 9 July 1842 and on 1 August 1846 he was reelected. During this period he gradually moved to the right of center, but did not take an extreme position. He left office when the Council of State was dissolved during the February Revolution of 1848.

Boudet was appointed by the Assembly to serve on the new Council of State, where he remained after the coup of 2 December 1851, having joined the Bonapartist group. On 23 June 1863 he was appointed Minister of the Interior by Napoleon III, replacing Victor de Persigny. His administration was uneventful, somewhat liberal towards the press. On 28 March 1865 he was replaced by Charles de La Valette, and the same day was promoted to the senate. With the fall of the empire, he returned to private life in September 1870.

Paul Boudet died in Paris on 17 November 1877.

== Portraits ==
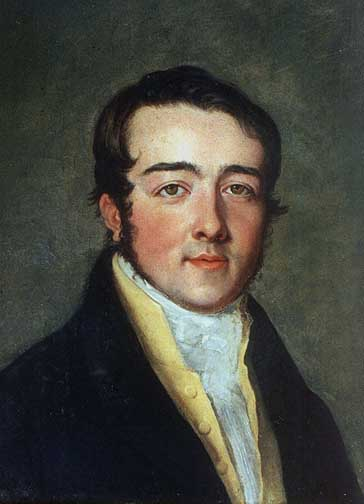
Boudet as a young man

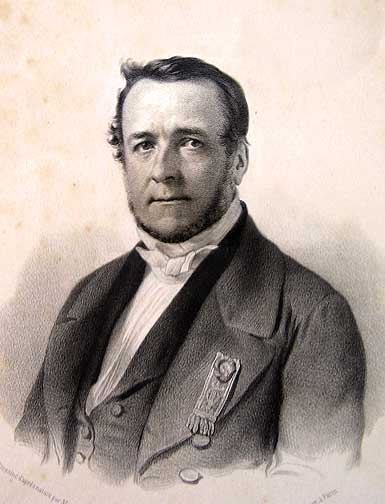
Boudet as a deputy

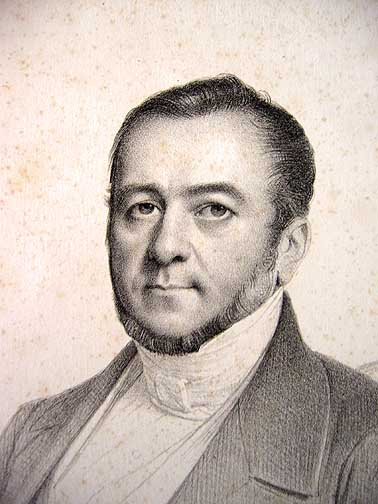

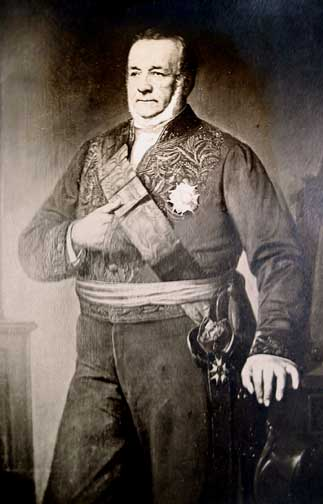
Boudet in old age

== Sources ==
- Robert, Adolphe; Cougny, Gaston (1889). "Boudet (Paul)". Dictionnaire des parlementaires français de 1789 à 1889. National Assembly of France.
