= Louis Henri Armand Behic =

French lawyer, businessman and politician

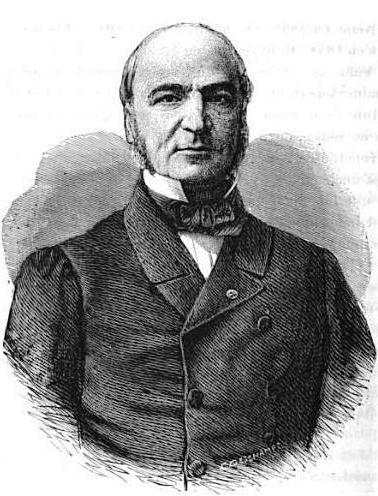
- Louis Henri Armand Behic
- Born: 15 January 1809; Paris, France
- Died: 2 March 1891 (aged 82); Paris, France
- Occupations: Lawyer, businessman, politician
- Known for: Minister and Senator of Second Empire

Louis Henri Armand Behic (15 January 1809 – 2 March 1891) was a French lawyer, businessman and politician who served as minister of Agriculture, Commerce and Public Works in the government of Napoleon III.

== Life ==
Louis Henri Armand Behic was born in Paris on 15 January 1809. He received a degree in law, and entered the financial administration in 1826. He was attached to the army treasury of the Invasion of Algiers in 1830. He became inspector of finance in 1845, and after visiting Corsica and the Caribbean in this role, later in 1845 was appointed director of control and general accounting for the Navy ministry.

On 1 August 1846 Behic was elected deputy for Avesnes, taking his seat on the center-right. He resigned during the February Revolution of 1848. He was director of the Vierzon iron works until he was elected in the first round to the Council of State in 1849, as a member of the legislation section. After the coup of December and the dissolution of the Council of State, Behic again became director of the Vierzon iron works.

In 1853 Behic was made inspector-general of the Messageries Maritimes, in charge of organizing the postal routes, and became director and president of the board of this company. In 1854 he was active in arranging transport for the Crimean War. He took over the Société des Forges et Chantiers de la Méditerranée for the Messageries Maritimes in 1856. He chaired the organizing committee for the colonial banks. He was appointed general counsel of the Bouches-du-Rhône for the canton of La Ciotat.

On 23 July 1865 the emperor appointed Behic minister of Agriculture, Commerce and Public Works, replacing Eugène Rouher. He initiated investigations into the Bank of France, the railway service and the state of agriculture, and promoted health regulations regarding cholera. He resigned on 17 January 1867 and three days later was appointed to the senate. On 30 January 1876 Bihac ran for election again, and was returned for the Gironde, taking his seat with the right-wing party l'Appel au peuple. He ran again on 5 January 1879 but was not reelected.

Louis Henri Armand Behic died on 2 March 1891 in Paris, aged 82.
