= Alfred Le Roux =

French poet, banker and politician

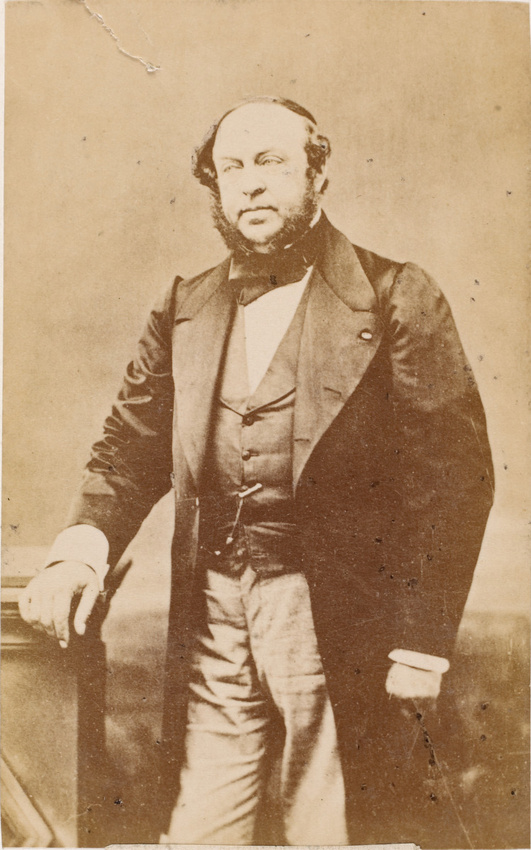
- Born: Alfred Paul Augustin Le Roux; 11 December 1815; Paris, France
- Died: 1 June 1880 (aged 64); Paris, France
- Occupations: Poet, banker, politician

Alfred Le Roux (11 December 1815 - 1 June 1880) was a French poet, banker, and politician. He was Minister of Agriculture and Commerce in the government of Napoleon III in 1869.

== Early years ==
Alfred Le Roux was born in Paris, France, on 11 December 1852, the son of a banker. As a young man, he wrote poetry, dedicating some verses to the exiled Henri, Count of Chambord, pretender to the French throne. He published a volume of poems in 1842, the novel Edouard Aubert in 1843, and the short story Henriette in the Revue des Deux-mondes in 1844. He then took charge of his father's house. His position in the world of business brought him a seat on the board of the Chemins de fer de l'Ouest in 1864. He was made chairman of the board of directors of the Société générale pour le développement du commerce et de l'industrie. He was a wealthy landowner in the Vendée and was elected general counsel of that department, representing Saint-Michel-en-l'Herm. He often presided over the council.

== Political career ==
For his monetary assistance to Prince Louis Napoleon while the latter was president, Le Roux was chosen on 29 February 1852, as the government candidate for the legislature in the 2nd district of the Vendée. He was elected and joined the majority who voted for the restoration of the Second French Empire, and he was constantly in favor of Napoleon's dynastic rights. Apart from this, he was mainly involved in business issues, where his competence was widely recognized. Le Roux was a good speaker and was often the secretary and rapporteur of the budget committee. He was reelected with the official support of the government on 22 June 1857, 1 June 1863 and 24 May 1869. He was vice president of the legislative body in 1863 and again in the short session of June 1869.

Le Roux was appointed Minister of Agriculture and Commerce on 14 July 1869, in a cabinet charged with modifying the imperial constitution. He and all his colleagues left office before the new ministry headed by Émile Ollivier was formed in January 1870. He was among those who voted for war with Prussia at the start of the Franco-Prussian War. He was charged by the House on 4 September 1870, to see General Louis-Jules Trochu and advise him to save the dynasty, but he said of his mission that it was too late.

== Later years ==
Le Roux returned to private life with the fall of the empire. In the elections of 14 October 1877, he was the official candidate of the government of Marshal MacMahon in the 2nd district of Fontenay-le-Comte. He was elected as a deputy and sat in the right-wing bonapartist group l'Appel au peuple. However, the election was later invalidated, and he was not returned on the second ballot. He was made Commander of the Legion of Honour on 13 August 1864, and Grand Officer of the Order on 13 August 1868. His daughter married the Count of la Grange.

Alfred Le Roux died in Paris on 1 June 1880.
