= Adolphe Billault =

French lawyer and politician (1805–1863)

Adolphe Augustin Marie Billault
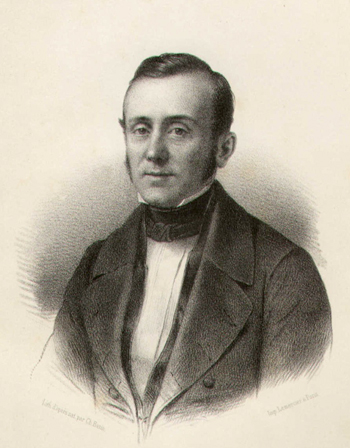
- Portrait of Adolphe Billault by Charles-Louis Bazin
- Born: 12 November 1805; Vannes, Morbihan, France
- Died: 13 October 1863 (aged 57); Basse-Goulaine, Nantes, Loire-Atlantique, France
- Occupations: Lawyer, politician
- Known for: President of the French National Assembly (9 March 1852 - 12 November 1854)

Adolphe Augustin Marie Billault (French pronunciation: [adɔlf oɡystɛ̃ maʁi bijo], 12 November 1805 – 13 October 1863) was a French lawyer and politician who played a leading role in the governments of Napoleon III.

== Early years ==
Adolphe Augustin Marie Billault was born on 12 November 1805 in Vannes, Morbihan, to an obscure family. As a young lawyer he asked for the hand of a rich heiress, Françoise Bourgault-Ducoudray. He told his prospective father-in-law, Guillaume Bourgault-Ducoudray, that he had little money and no reputation, but in three years would be the leading lawyer in Nantes, in another three years would be a national representative, and three years later would be a minister. Impressed by his determination, the young woman accepted him. He kept his word. By 1830 he was a municipal Councillor in Nantes. He became President of the Bar of his order, and member of the General Council of the Loire-Inférieure.

== National deputy ==
Billault was elected deputy on 4 November 1837 for the constituency of the Lower Loire (Aucenis), taking his seat on the left and voting with the opposition. As a lawyer he became the adviser of the Duke of Aumale. He was reelected on 2 March 1839 and accepted the position of Deputy Secretary of State of the Ministry of Agriculture and Commerce, under the minister Alexandre Goüin. By 1838 he was a member and secretary of the Railway Commission. When the cabinet retired on 1 March 1838 Billaut returned to the opposition. Billault was reelected on 9 July 1842 and on 1 August 1846. He continued to often vote with the opposition to the dynasty, while at times agreeing with the government.

After the February Revolution of 1848 he was elected on 23 April 1848 to represent Loire-Inférieure. He declared himself Republican and voted with the party led by Louis-Eugène Cavaignac. However, he began to drift towards the right. He failed to be reelected, but became active in the extra-parliamentary cabals that were to decide the fate of the Republic.

== Bonapartist ==
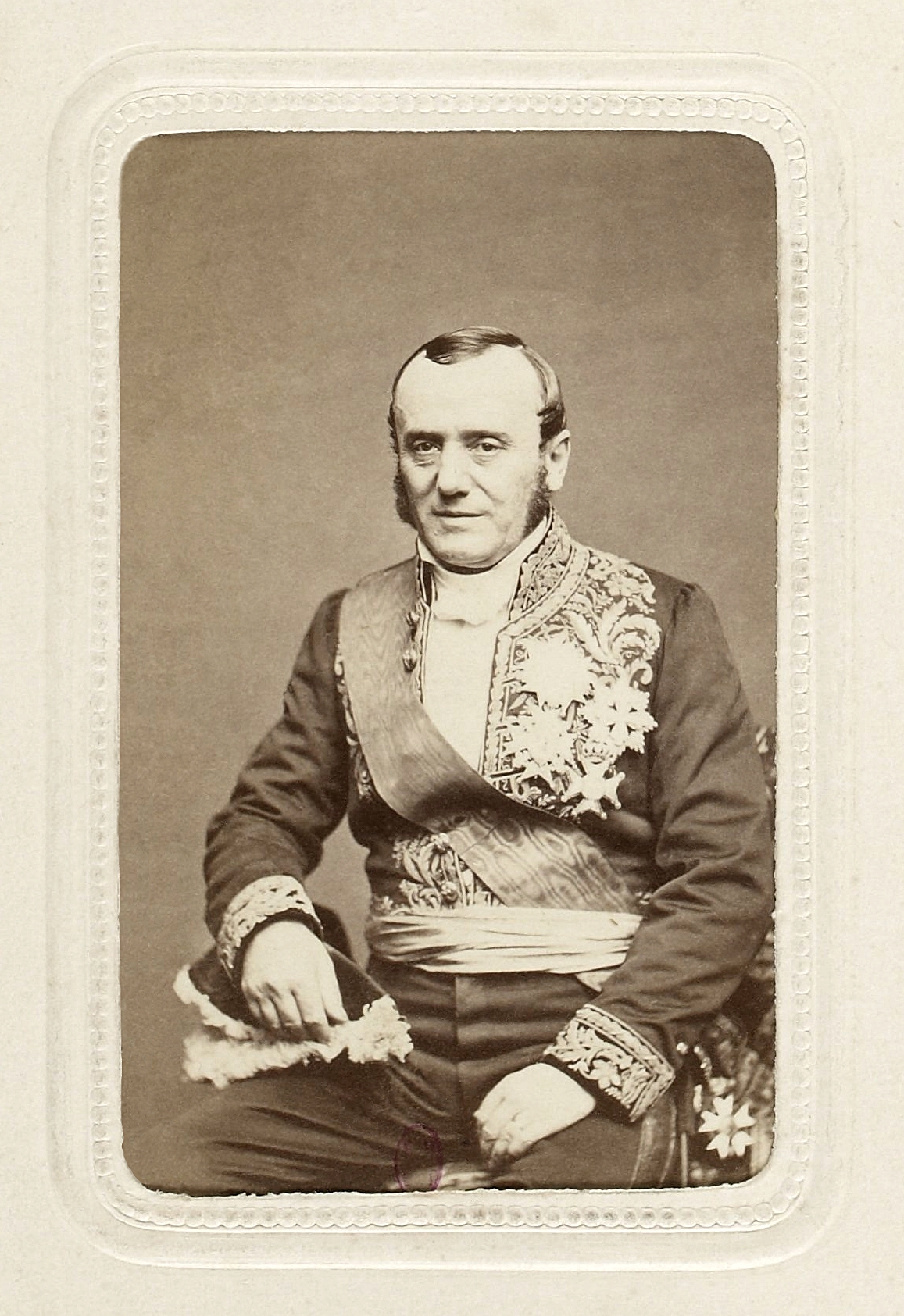
Billault in his uniform as a minister

After coming to fully agree with the policy of Louis-Napoléon Bonaparte, Billault became a frequent visitor to the Élysée Palace. On the retirement of Léon Faucher he was almost given the task of forming a ministry, but could not create a working combination. Billault was an official government candidate in the election of 29 February 1852, where he was returned as deputy for the 2nd district of Ariège. Louis-Napoléon named him president of the legislature. In this role, on 1 December 1852 Billault went to the Château de Saint-Cloud to bring the results of a plebiscite which had voted in favor of restoring the empire, with Louis-Napoléon as the Emperor Napoleon III.

The Emperor appointed Billault Minister of the Interior on 19 June 1854, and made him a senator on 4 December 1854. He remained in office until the crisis caused by the assassination attempt by Felice Orsini, when he was replaced by General Charles-Marie-Esprit Espinasse on 8 February 1858. When Napoleon III tried to inaugurate the liberal empire on 24 November 1860, he called on Billault to serve as minister without portfolio. In this role, Billault acted as an eloquent defender of imperial policy. The stress of the job damaged his health. Billault died prematurely at Nantes, Lower Loire, on 13 October 1863.

The city of Nantes erected a statue of Billault in 1867.
