= Saint-Paulet =

Commune in Occitanie, France

- Commune
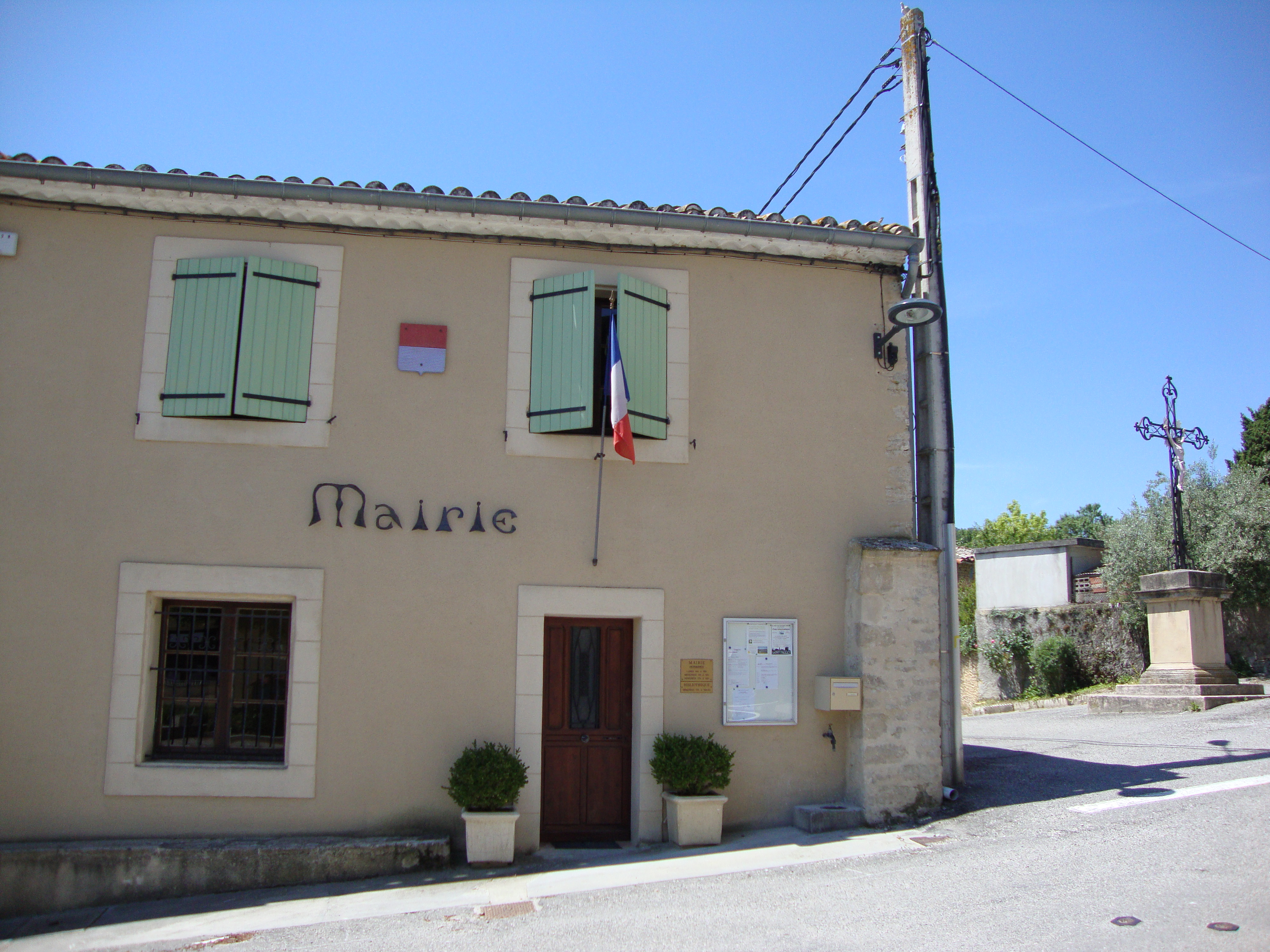
- The town hall in Saint-Paulet

- Coat of arms
- Location of Saint-Paulet
- Location within France Location within Occitanie
- Coordinates: 43°24′25″N 1°52′43″E
- Country: France
- Region: Occitania
- Department: Aude
- Arrondissement: Carcassonne
- Canton: Le Bassin chaurien

Government
  - Mayor (2020–2026): Gérard Lamarque
- Area^{1}: 7.42 km^{2} (2.86 sq mi)
- Elevation: 265 m (869 ft)
- Highest elevation: 285 m (935 ft)
- Lowest elevation: 170 m (560 ft)
- Population (2023): 205
  - Density: 27.6/km^{2} (71.6/sq mi)
- Time zone: UTC+01:00 (CET)
  - Summer (DST): UTC+02:00 (CEST)
- INSEE/Postal code: 11362 /11320
- ^{1} French Land Register data, which excludes lakes, ponds, glaciers > 1 km^{2} (0.386 sq mi or 247 acres) and river estuaries.

Saint-Paulet (French pronunciation: [sɛ̃ polɛ]; Occitan: Sant Paulet) is a commune in the Aude department in southern France.

== Population ==
Historical population
Year	Pop.	±% p.a.
1968	170	—
1975	134	−3.34%
1982	144	+1.03%
1990	140	−0.35%
1999	155	+1.14%
2007	180	+1.89%
2012	182	+0.22%
2017	199	+1.80%
2023	205	+0.50%
Source: INSEE

== See also ==
- Communes of the Aude department
