= Pont-Authou =

- Commune
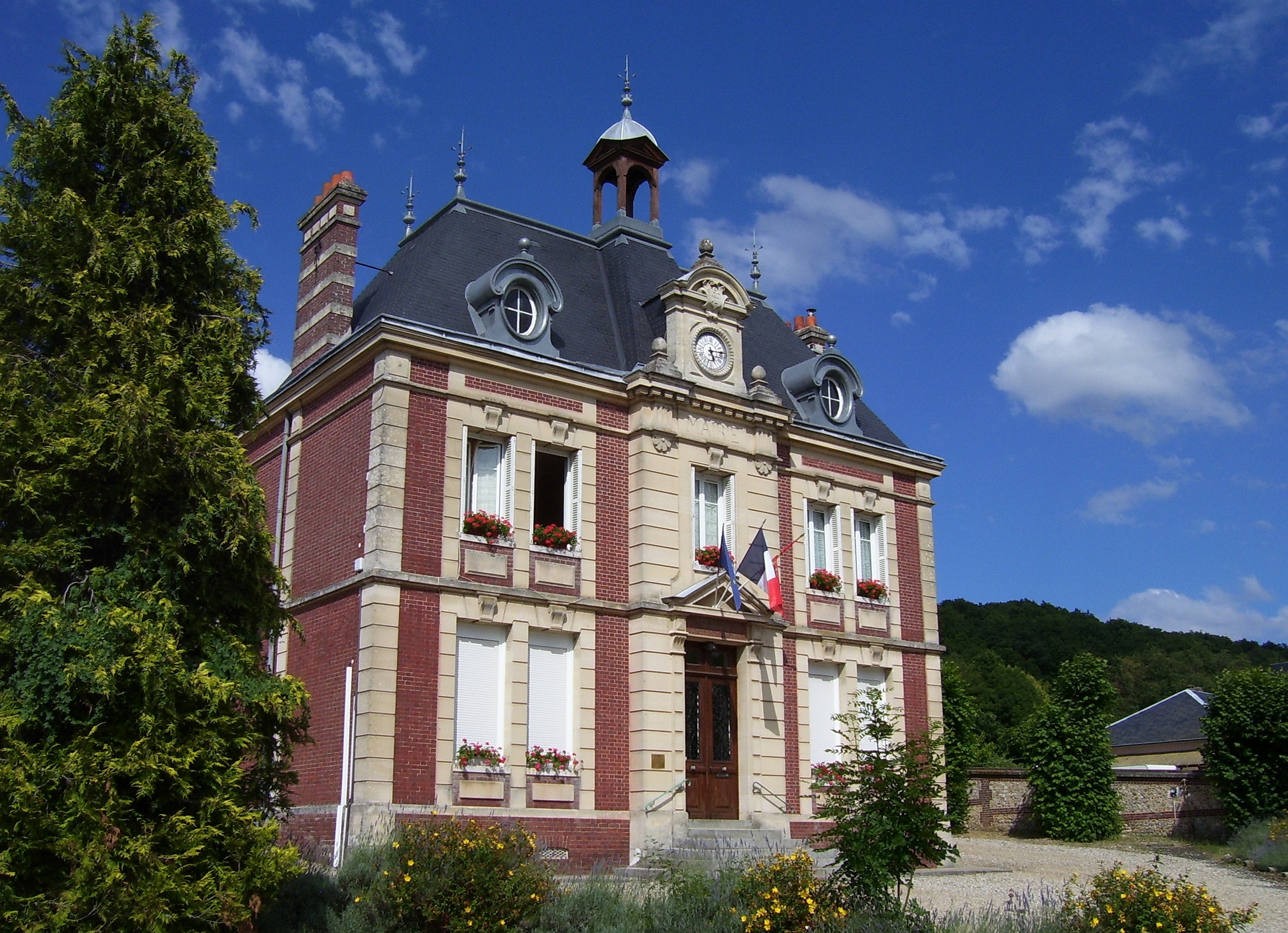
- Town hall
- Location of Pont-Authou
- Location within France Location within Normandy
- Coordinates: 49°14′39″N 0°42′06″E
- Country: France
- Region: Normandy
- Department: Eure
- Arrondissement: Bernay
- Canton: Pont-Audemer

Government
  - Mayor (2020–2026): Karine Vallée
- Area^{1}: 3.52 km^{2} (1.36 sq mi)
- Elevation: 117 m (384 ft)
- Highest elevation: 136 m (446 ft)
- Lowest elevation: 37 m (121 ft)
- Population (2023): 584
  - Density: 166/km^{2} (430/sq mi)
- Time zone: UTC+01:00 (CET)
  - Summer (DST): UTC+02:00 (CEST)
- INSEE/Postal code: 27468 /27290
- ^{1} French Land Register data, which excludes lakes, ponds, glaciers > 1 km^{2} (0.386 sq mi or 247 acres) and river estuaries.

Pont-Authou (French pronunciation: [pɔ̃.t‿otu]) is a commune in the Eure department in Normandy in northern France.

== Geography ==
The commune along with another 69 communes shares part of a 4,747 hectare, Natura 2000 conservation area, called Risle, Guiel, Charentonne.

== Population ==
Historical population
Year	Pop.	±% p.a.
1968	538	—
1975	534	−0.11%
1982	639	+2.60%
1990	613	−0.52%
1999	675	+1.08%
2007	707	+0.58%
2012	684	−0.66%
2017	632	−1.57%
2023	584	−1.31%
Source: INSEE

== See also ==
- Communes of the Eure department
