= Claude Alphonse Delangle =

French magistrate, politician and lawyer (1797–1869)

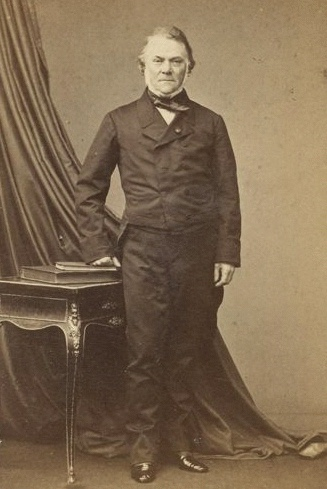
- Claude Alphonse Delangle photograph by André Adolphe Eugène Disdéri
- Born: 6 April 1797; Varzy, Nièvre, France
- Died: 25 December 1869 (aged 72); Paris, France
- Occupations: Magistrate and politician
- Known for: Minister of Justice

Claude Alphonse Delangle (6 April 1797 – 25 December 1869) was a French magistrate and politician. He was Minister of Justice in 1851 under the Second French Empire.

== Life ==
Claude Alphonse Delangle was born in 1797, son of a masonry contractor. At first he meant to become a teacher, but then took up the law. He built up a successful practice. He became a barrister, then Advocate General at the Court of Cassation. His first attempts at election as a deputy failed. He went on to become a prosecutor at the Court of Paris.

In 1846 Delangle succeeded in being elected, taking his seat with the conservatives. In 1848 the republicans removed him from office, and he became an early supporter of Louis-Napoléon Bonaparte. As a result, he was appointed President of the Municipal Board of the Department of the Seine in 1850, president of the interior, education and religion section of the Council of State, Attorney General of the Court of Cassation and President of the Court of Paris.

Delangle was appointed to the senate in 1852. In 1858 he received the portfolio of Minister of the Interior, and from 1859 to 1863 he was Minister of Justice. He then returned to the Senate, where he was several times vice president. In 1865 he returned to his post as Attorney General of the Court of Cassation. He died on 25 December 1869.
