= Adolphe de Forcade La Roquette =

French politician

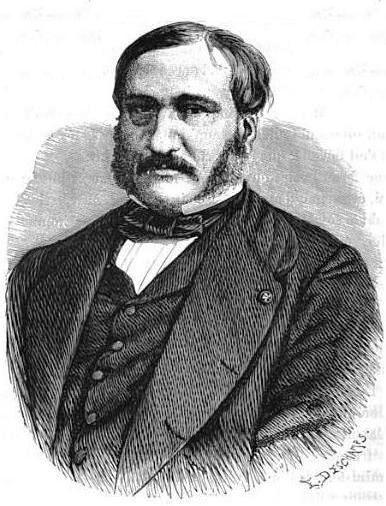
Adolphe de Forcade La Roquette

Adolphe de Forcade La Roquette (8 April 1820 – 15 August 1874) was a French politician.

== Biography ==
La Roquette was born in Paris, the half-brother of the Maréchal de Saint-Arnaud. He trained as a lawyer before embarking upon a political career. He was successively Minister of Finance (26 November 1860 – 14 November 1861), senator (1861), Vice-President of the Conseil d'État (1863), Minister of Commerce and Minister of Agriculture (1867) and finally Minister of the Interior (from 17 December 1868) in the third government of Napoleon III. He distinguished himself by his severity towards the opposition, and disapproved of the concessions of the Empire libéral in the 1860s. After the formation of the cabinet of Émile Ollivier on 2 January 1870, he resigned as a member of the senate and had himself elected député for Lot-et-Garonne, thereafter becoming one of the leaders of the right. After the fall of the Second Empire, he retired from political life.

In 1847, he became joint owner, with his half-brother the Maréchal de Saint-Arnaud, of the Château Malromé, which he had restored, and where decades later Toulouse-Lautrec died.

== Sources ==
- Larousse du XXe siècle
