= Edmond Valléry Gressier =

French lawyer, senator and minister

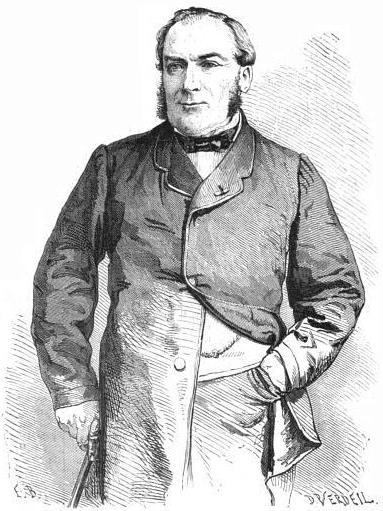

Edmond Valléry Gressier (21 December 1813 in Corbie – 1 November 1892) was a French lawyer, senator for Somme (and President of its General Council) and the Minister of Agriculture of France during the Franco-Prussian War.
