= Charles-Marie-Esprit Espinasse =

French military officer

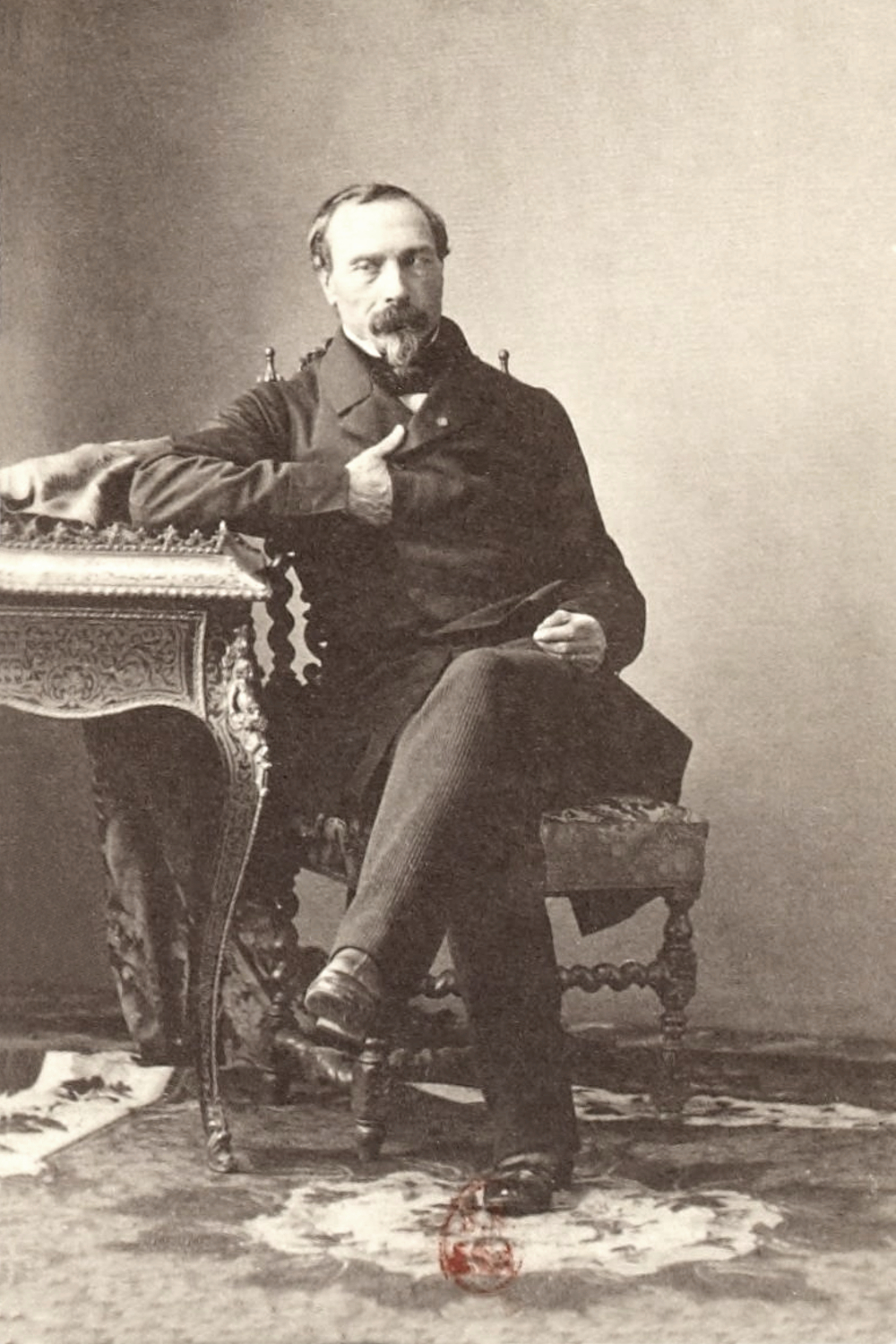
- Charles-Marie-Esprit Espinasse in 1855
- Born: 2 April 1815; Castelnaudary, Aude, France
- Died: 4 June 1859 (aged 44); Magenta, Lombardy, Italy
- Occupation: Military officer
- Known for: Minister of the Interior

Charles-Marie-Esprit Espinasse (2 April 1815 – 4 June 1859) was a French military officer who was briefly Minister of the Interior and Public Security in 1858. He died during the Italian campaign of 1859.

== Life ==
Charles Marie Esprit Espinasse was born in Castelnaudary on 2 April 1815, son of Jean Espinasse and Germaine Robert. He was admitted to the Military Academy of Saint-Cyr in 1833. On graduation he became a sub-lieutenant in the 47th infantry regiment of the line. He went on to the Foreign Legion, where he was promoted to lieutenant in April 1838.

Espinasse participated in the campaign in Algeria from 1835 to 1849, where he was severely wounded in combat at Aures with four shots to the chest, lower abdomen and thighs. On 17 January 1841 he was a captain in the 1st Regiment of Foot Chasseurs. He was promoted to battalion commander in the regiment of Zouaves, where he served from 20 October 1845 to 1 May 1849. With the 22nd Infantry he participated in the Siege of Rome, where he distinguished himself by being the first to enter the city. In 1851 General Jacques Leroy de Saint Arnaud brought him to Paris to command the 42nd Infantry.

Espinasse supported Louis Napoleon in the coup of 2 December 1851, and became his aide de camp. On 10 May 1852 he was promoted to brigadier general. He was given command of the 3rd infantry brigade at the Helfaut camp near Saint-Omer. He married Mary Festugière of Bordeaux in 1853, with whom he had three children. At the start of the Crimean War he led the 1st Brigade of the 1st Infantry Division. He distinguished himself in the Battle of the Chernaya and the Battle of Malakoff. He was promoted to major general, commander of the 3rd Infantry Division of General Pierre Bosquet's 2nd Corps.

On return to France, Espinasse became inspector general of infantry in 1857. The emperor appointed him Minister of the Interior and Public Security after the assassination attempt by Felice Orsini on 14 January 1858. He held this position from 7 February to 14 June 1858, when he was appointed senator. Espinasse joined the army of Italy on 2 April 1859 as commander of the 2nd Division of the 2nd Corps of General MacMahon's army. Espinasse was killed in the village of Magenta, Lombardy on 4 June 1859, during the Battle of Magenta.

== Sources ==
- Crossland, James (2023). The rise of devils: fear and the origins of modern terrorism. Manchester: Manchester University Press. ISBN 978-1-5261-6067-6.
- Petit, Bernard (1995). J. Tulard (ed.). Dictionnaire du second Empire. Fayard. ISBN 978-2213592817.
