= Noël Lefebvre-Duruflé =

French politician

Noël Jacques Lefebvre-Duruflé
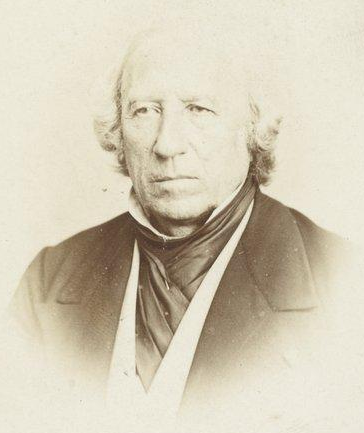
- Born: Noël Jacques Lefebvre; 19 February 1792; Pont-Audemer
- Died: 3 November 1877 (aged 85); Pont-Authou
- Occupation: Politician

Noël Jacques Lefebvre-Duruflé (19 February 1792 – 3 November 1877) was a French politician who became Minister of Agriculture and Commerce in the French Second Republic, and under the Second French Empire was Minister of Public Works. In the French Third Republic he was convicted on a corruption charge.

== Early years ==
Noël Jacques Lefebvre was born on 19 February 1792 in Pont-Audemer, Eure, France. He was educated at the college of Pont-Audemer and then came to Paris to study law. He came to the attention of Charles-Guillaume Étienne, who presented him to the Duke of Bassano, and he obtained a job at the Ministry of the State. He became a member of the Conseil d'Etat in 1814, but was dismissed with the restoration of the monarchy.

Lefebvre became involved in the struggles of the Liberal party, was one of the founders of Le Nain jaune (The Yellow Dwarf) and contributed to the Mercure de France. In 1822 he married the daughter of M. Duruflé, a wealthy manufacturer of cloth, and added his father-in-law's name to his own. They had nine children. He became a partner in the business, and introduced into its factories various manufacturing processes that had been used successfully in England and America. He left the business in 1847 to dedicate himself to politics.

== Political career ==
During the July Monarchy Lefebvre tried several times to be elected as deputy, running for the Pont-Audemer constituency on a platform opposing King Louis Philippe. After the February Revolution of 1848 he again failed to be elected to the Constituent Assembly. He was able to gain an appointment as the general counsel of the department of Eure. On 13 May 1849 he was elected deputy for the Eure in the legislative assembly, running as a conservative. In 1850 he help passed the bill to increase the salary of the President of the Republic, the future emperor Napoleon III.

On 23 November 1851 Lefebvre was made Minister of Agriculture and Commerce. After the coup of 2 December 1851, on 25 January 1852 he was made Minister of Public Works and a member of the Consultative Commission. While he was minister a telegraph line was established between Turin and France, 2,000 kilometres (1,200 mi) of railways were built, and packet boat concessions were awarded for the Mediterranean Sea. On 28 July 1853 Lefebvre-Duruflé left the ministry and was appointed to the Senate, where he remained for the remainder of the empire. On 14 August 1862 he was made a Grand Officer of the Legion of Honour.

== Third Republic ==
After the revolution of 4 September 1870 Lefebvre returned to private life. He was brought before a police court for irregular financial transactions while he was administrator of the Société industrielle. On 2 December 1873 he was convicted of violating the Companies act and fined. A year later this led to him being removed from the list of members of the Legion of Honour. He died in Pont-Authou, Eure, on 3 November 1877.

== Selected works ==
- Tableau historique de la Russie (1812)
- Almanach des modes (1814 à 1817)
- Ports et côtes de France de Dunkerque au Havre (1831)
- Considérations sur la nécessité de donner en France un nouvel essor au commerce d'exportation (1843)
