= François-Xavier Joseph de Casabianca =

French aristocrat, lawyer and politician

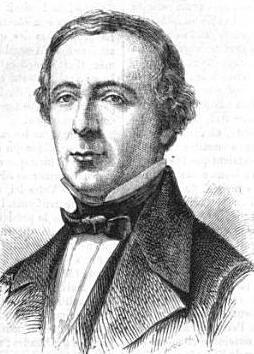
- François, Count of Casabianca
- Born: 27 June 1796; Nice, France
- Died: 24 May 1881 (aged 84); Paris, France
- Occupations: Lawyer and politician
- Known for: Minister of the Second French Empire

François-Xavier Joseph de Casabianca (27 June 1796 – 24 May 1881) was a French aristocrat, lawyer and politician who served as minister of agriculture and commerce, minister of finance, and president of the council of state in the government of Louis Napoleon.

== Early years ==
De Casabianca was born in Nice, Alpes-Maritimes, on 27 June 1796 to François-Louis-Camille-Giocante de Casabianca (1776–1837) and Maria-Ilaria (1773–1835), and was nephew of Raphaël, Comte de Casabianca. The family had contributed to the annexation of that island to France.

De Casabianca obtained good grades at the lycée Napoléon, studied law at the University of Paris, and in 1820 he became a member of the bar of Bastia, in Corsica, practicing as a lawyer until 1848. Since he was a Bonapartist, the government of King Louis Philippe I kept him away from public office.

== Representative and minister ==
After the February Revolution, on 23 April 1848 de Casabianca was elected to the constituent assembly as representative of Corsica. He joined the majority and generally voted with the right. After the presidential election of 10 December 1848 he became one of the most zealous supporters of the president, Prince Louis Napoleon. He was reelected on 13 May 1849 as representative of Corsica in the legislative assembly. He continued to support the president, while joining the monarchist majority in votes. However, he abandoned the majority when conflict broke out with Louis Napoleon.

On 26 October 1851 de Casabianca joined the cabinet as minister of agriculture and commerce after the retirement of Léon Faucher, and after a few weeks became minister of finance, a position held at the time of the coup of 2 December 1851. When told by Louis-Napoleon of the planned coup the day before it took place, de Casabianca refused on principle to participate and was temporarily relieved of office. On 22 January 1852 de Casabianca was charged with organizing the new ministry of state. He left office on 28 July 1852 and entered the senate, where he voted for the establishment of the Second French Empire, and continued to vote with the majority.

== Later years ==
By a decree of 5 March 1864 de Casabianca was named attorney general at the court of accounts. During the Franco-Prussian War (19 July 1870 – 10 May 1871), on 4 September 1870 he returned to private life. He briefly returned to politics when he was elected on 14 May 1876 as deputy for the Bastia district. He sat on the right with the Appel au peuple party. He did not stand in the 1877 elections. De Casabianca was named a grand officer of the Legion of Honour in 1858. He died in Paris on 24 May 1881.
