= Théodore Ducos =

French politician and shipowner (1801–1855)

Jean-Étienne-Théodore Ducos
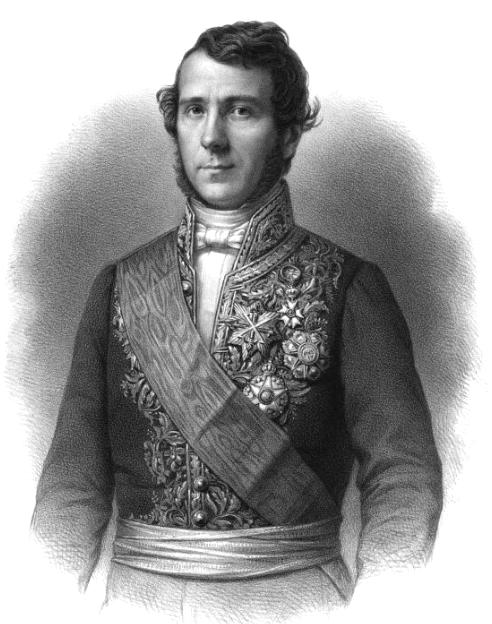
- Jean-Étienne-Théodore Ducos
- Born: 22 April 1801; Bordeaux, France
- Died: 17 April 1855 (aged 53); Paris, France
- Occupation: Politician

Jean-Étienne-Théodore Ducos (22 April 1801 – 17 April 1855) was a French politician and shipowner.

== Life ==
Jean-Étienne-Théodore Ducos was born in Bordeaux, France, on 22 April 1801 into a family of shipowners. He became a general counsel, and in 1834 was elected deputy for Bordeaux. He sat with the opposition to the dynasty until 1848. After the February Revolution of 1848 he was elected to the Constituent Assembly.

Ducos was defeated in the elections of May 1849, but a few months later was elected as a representative of the Seine. He transferred his allegiance to the Bonapartists. On 9 January 1851 he was Minister of Marine and Colonies, and accepted the dismissal of General Changarnier. He and his other cabinet colleagues were forced from office that month, but he was re-appointed the day after 2 December 1851 coup. During his administration steam boats were developed for the military, and France occupied New Caledonia. He was responsible for organizing military transport during the Crimean War.

Théodore Ducos became a senator on 4 March 1853. He died in office on 17 April 1855.
