= Jean-Baptiste Philibert Vaillant =

Marshal of France Jean-Baptiste Philibert Vaillant 1st Count Vaillant
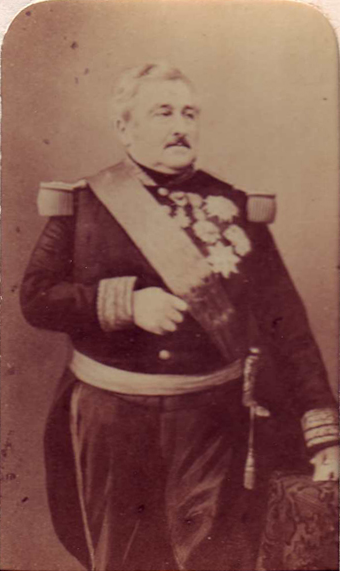
- Maréchal Vaillant, c. 1860
- Born: 6 December 1790; Dijon, France
- Died: 4 June 1872 (aged 81); Paris, France
- Military career
- Allegiance: First French Empire; Bourbon Restoration; July Monarchy; French Second Republic; Second French Empire
- Branch: French Army
- Service years: 1809–1870
- Rank: Maréchal de France
- Commands: Minister of War (1854-1859)
- Wars: Napoleonic Wars; French invasion of Russia; War of the Sixth Coalition; Hundred Days; French conquest of Algeria; Ten Days' Campaign; Crimean War; Second Italian War of Independence
- Awards: Legion of Honour

Jean-Baptiste Philibert Vaillant, 1st Comte Vaillant (6 December 1790 – 4 June 1872), born in Dijon, was a Marshal of France.

== Biography ==
Vaillant entered the French army in 1809 in the corps of engineers. He served in the French invasion of Russia (1812) and the next year became a prisoner of war after the Battle of Kulm. During the Hundred Days Vaillant fought at Ligny and Waterloo. Vaillant commanded a battalion in the 1830 campaign against Algiers. Promoted to lieutenant colonel, he served under Gérard in the expedition into Belgium in 1831.

Vaillant commanded the fortress at Algiers from 1837 to 1838. Recalled to France, he was made director of the École polytechnique. Promoted to lieutenant general, Vaillant was put in charge of the building of the Parisian fortifications in 1845 under the command of Dode de la Brunerie.

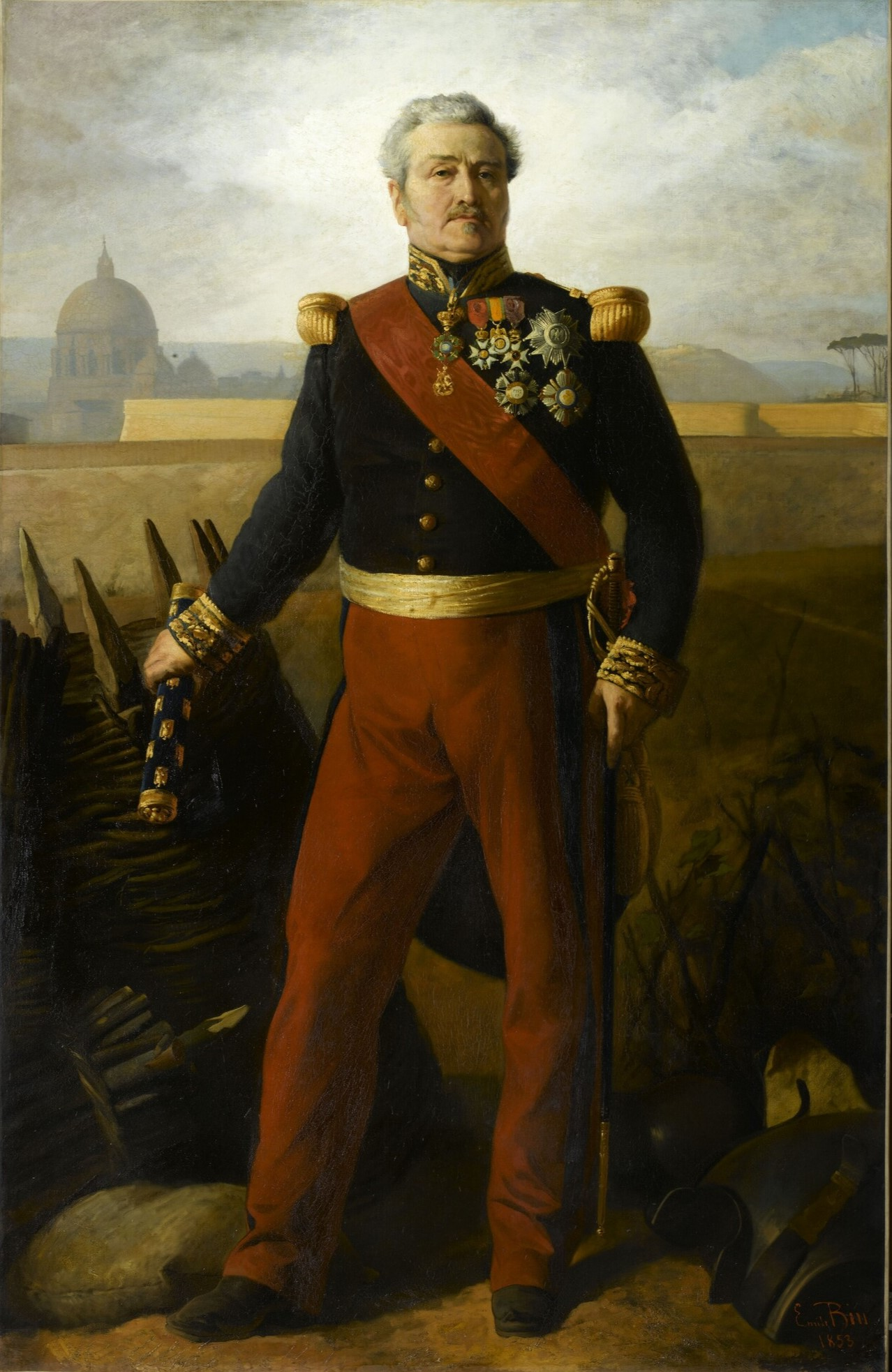
Jean-Baptiste Philibert Vaillant; by Émile Bin (1853)

In 1849, Vaillant was given command of the engineers in the French expeditionary corps to Rome. Promoted to Marshal of France in 1851, Vaillant served as Minister of War from 1854 to 1859, holding the position throughout the Crimean War.

On the outbreak of the Franco-Austrian War he resigned as Minister of War in order to serve as Chief of Staff to Napoleon III, who took personal command of the French Army. In 1860, Vaillant became minister responsible for the Imperial House and in 1864, he was made Grand Chancellor of the Legion d'Honneur. After the fall of the Second French Empire in September 1870, Vaillant was banished from France but was allowed back, returning in 1871. He died in Paris the next year.

Preceded by Jacques Leroy de Saint Arnaud	Minister of War; March 11, 1854 – May 5, 1859	Succeeded by Jacques Louis Randon
