= Hippolyte Fortoul =

French journalist, historian and politician

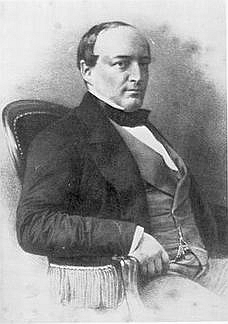
- Born: 4 August 1811; Digne, Alpes-de-Haute-Provence, France
- Died: 4 July 1856 (aged 44); Bad Ems, Germany
- Occupations: Journalist, historian and politician

Hippolyte Nicolas Honoré Fortoul (4 August 1811 – 4 July 1856) was a French journalist, historian and politician.

== Early years ==
Hippolyte Fortoul was born on 4 August 1811 in Digne, Alpes-de-Haute-Provence, France as the son of an attorney who began a prefectural career in 1831. He attended secondary school in Digne and then Lyon. Between 1829 and 1837, he was a journalist in Paris and traveled to Belgium, Germany, Switzerland, Italy and England between 1834 and 1837. In 1837 he decided that there was no future in journalism, and decided to enter the academic world.

In 1838 he published a history of the 16th century and an autobiographical novel. In 1840 he traveled in southern Germany and northern Italy. He earned a PhD in 1841 with a thesis on Aristotle written in Latin. In 1841 Fortoul was appointed professor of literature at the University of Toulouse. He married that year. He published a two-volume work on German Art in 1841-42. In 1845 he was appointed professor of French literature and dean of the faculty of letters at Aix-en-Provence.

== Political career ==
After the February Revolution of 1848, Fortoul ran for 1848 Constituent Assembly election, but was defeated. He was elected as deputy for Basses-Alpes in the 1849 French legislative election. He steadily moved towards a Bonapartist position. In October 1851 he was appointed Minister of the Navy, and on 3 December 1851 he became Minister of Education and Religious Affairs. He was appointed senator in 1854. He died of a heart attack on 4 July 1856 in Bad Ems, Germany.

== Principal works ==
- Grandeur de la vie privée. Paris : Gosselin et Coquebert, 1838, vol.1; vol. 2.
- Du génie de Virgile. Lyon : Boital, 1840.
- De l’art en Allemagne. Paris : Jules Labitte, 1841-1842, 2 vol.
- Essai sur les poëmes et les images de la danse des morts. Paris : Jules Labitte, s. d. [1842].
- Essais sur la théorie et sur l’histoire de la peinture chez les anciens et chez les modernes. Paris : Jules Labitte, 1845 (extrait de L’Encyclopédie nouvelle).
- Études d’archéologie et d’histoire. Paris : Firmin Didot, 1854, vol. 1; vol. 2.
