= Pierre Magne =

French lawyer and politician

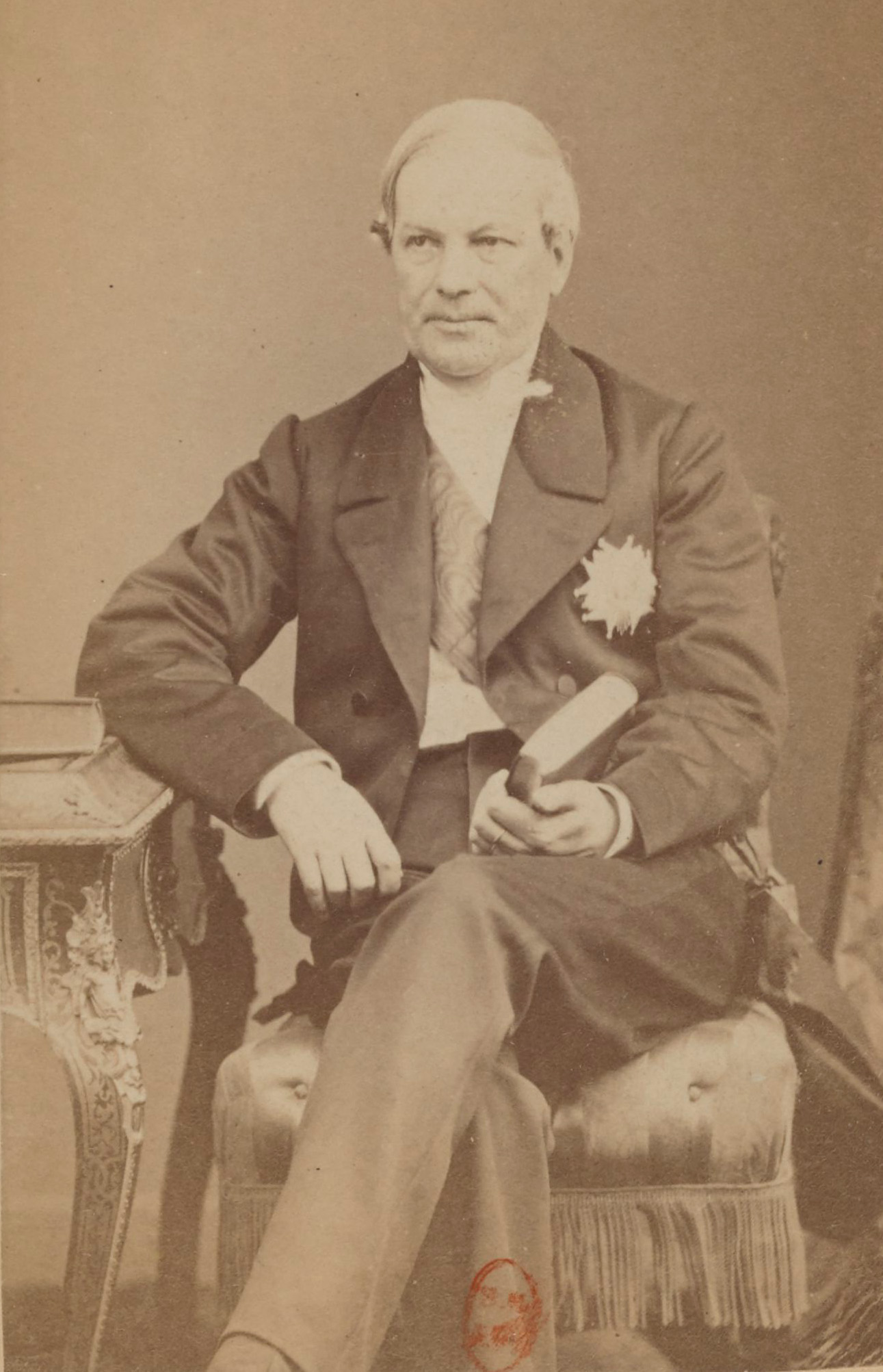
- Born: 3 December 1806; Périgueux, Dordogne, France
- Died: 17 February 1879 (aged 72); Château de Montaigne, Dordogne, France
- Occupation: Politician
- Known for: Minister of Finance

Pierre Magne (3 December 1806 – 17 February 1879) was a lawyer and French politician. He was a member of parliament from 1843 to 1848, a senator in the Second French Empire, and a representative and then senator in the French Third Republic. He was Minister of Finance several times.

== Early years ==
Pierre Magne was born in Périgueux, Dordogne, on 3 December 1806. As a youth he was sponsored by Marshal Thomas Robert Bugeaud. He studied law at the University of Toulouse, and after qualifying as a lawyer joined the bar of Périgueux. For some time he was advisor to the prefecture of Dordogne.

== Second Republic and Empire ==
On 19 August 1843 Magne ran successfully for election as deputy for the 1st district of Dordogne. He joined the Conservative majority. He presented various reports on finance for Algeria, and was a loyal supporter of his sponsor, Marshal Bugeaud. He was appointed rapporteur of revenue estimates. Magne was reelected on 1 August 1846, and was soon appointed Chief Counsel to the Ministry of Finance, then Deputy Secretary of State in the Ministry of War. For this appointment he had to seek reelection, and succeeded on 18 December 1847.

During the French Revolution of 1848 Magne lost office, but as a supporter of the presidential goals of Louis-Napoléon Bonaparte in November 1849 he was appointed Under-Secretary of State for the Finance department. In the cabinet of 9 January 1851 he was made Minister of Works. On 6 July 1851 he was elected Representative of the Dordogne, retaining his ministerial portfolio. He lost power briefly in January 1852, but returned to office five months later.

On 31 December 1852 Magne was appointed to the Senate. In 1854 he was appointed Minister of Finance, holding this post until November 1860. He then was appointed Minister without Portfolio. He resigned and was appointed to the Privy Council on 1 April 1863. On 13 November 1867 he was again appointed Minister of Finance. His first act was to initiate the float of a loan on 27 January 1868 to cover army pensions. On 27 December 1869 he retired before the cabinet of Émile Ollivier was formed, but on 3 January 1870 was appointed to Ollivier's cabinet. He lost power on 4 September 1870 during the Franco-Prussian War (19 July 1870 – 10 May 1871).

== Third Republic ==
On 2 July 1871 Magne ran successfully as candidate for Dordogne in the National assembly. He joined the Orléanist parliamentary group, Centre droit, voted with the monarchists and was a member of several committees on finance. In the first cabinet of de Broglie (25 May 1873 – 16 May 1874) he was again appointed minister of finance. He resigned from the cabinet on 15 July 1874. On 30 January 1876 he was elected Senator for the Dordogne. He was relatively inactive, often missing sessions due to illness. He died at the Château de Montaigne, Dordogne, on 17 February 1879, aged 72.
