= Émile Ollivier ministry =

French government ministry in 1870

Émile Ollivier
- 3rd ministry of the Second French Empire

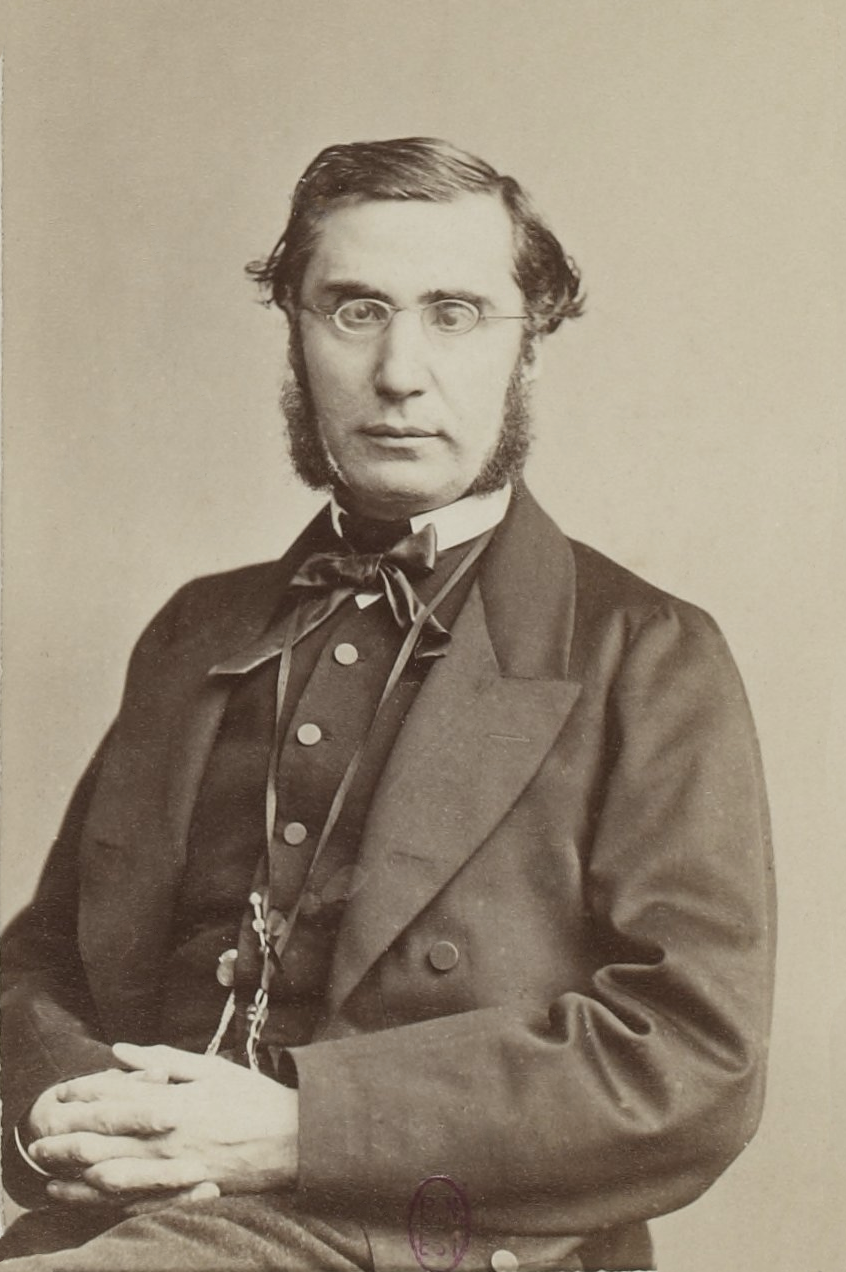
- Émile Ollivier
- Date formed: 2 January 1870
- Date dissolved: 10 August 1870

People and organisations
- Head of government: Émile Ollivier

History
- Predecessor: Fourth cabinet of Napoleon III
- Successor: Cousin-Montauban ministry

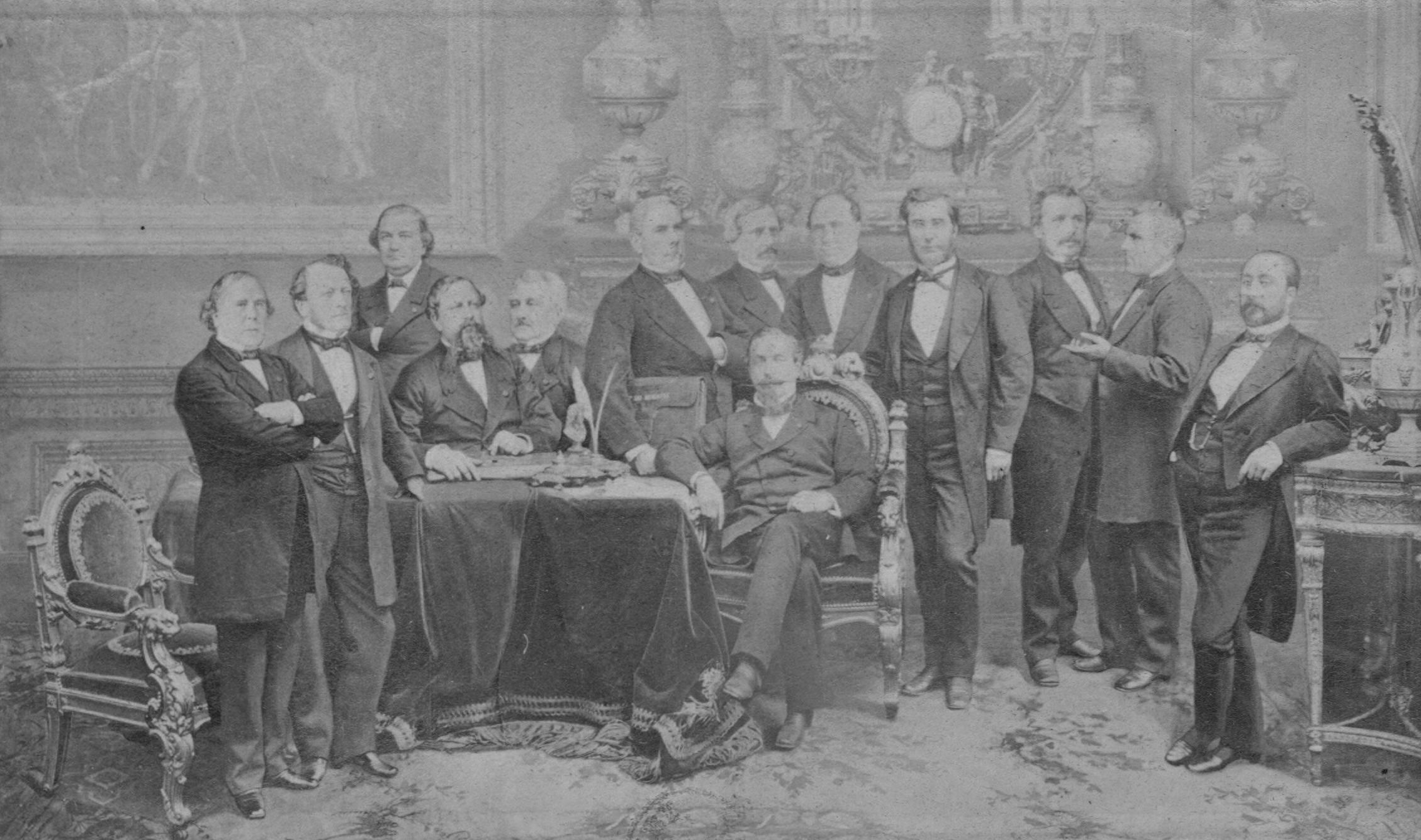
Photograph by Appert of the Ollivier Ministry with Napoléon III (seated, centre). From left to right: Segris, Buffet, Rigault de Genouilly, Le Bœuf, Vaillant, Daru, Chevandier de Valdrôme, Louvet, Émile Ollivier, Talhouët-Roy, Esquirou de Parieu and Richard

The Émile Ollivier ministry was the penultimate government of the Second French Empire. Led by Émile Ollivier, a republican opponent of the Empire, it was initially composed of moderate bonapartists and orléanists. However following the constitutional referendum on 8 May liberal members of the cabinet resigned and were replaced with politicians of a more authoritarian type. It lasted from 2 January 1870 until 10 August 1870, on the outbreak of the Franco-Prussian War, when it was replaced by the Cousin-Montauban ministry. It was often referred to at the time as the Ministry of 2 January (French: ministère du 2 janvier).

It was brought down by the legislature following the first defeats in the Franco-Prussian War, in the only unanimous vote of no confidence in French parliamentary history.

== Composition ==
Head of government (de facto) Minister of Justice and Religious Affairs	Émile Ollivier
President of the Council of State	Félix Esquirou de Parieu
Minister of War	Edmond Le Bœuf until 20 July 1870 Pierre Charles Dejean from 20 July 1870
Minister of Agriculture and Trade	Charles Louvet
Minister of Public Works	Auguste de Talhouët-Roy until 15 May 1870; Ignace Plichon until 10 August 1870
Minister of Education	Alexis Segris until 14 April 1870 Maurice Richard (interim) until 15 May 1870 Jacques Mège from 15 May 1870
Minister of the Navy and Colonies	Charles Rigault de Genouilly
Minister of Foreign Affairs	Napoléon Daru until 14 April 1870 Émile Ollivier (ínterim) until 15 May 1870 Agénor de Gramont from 15 May 1870
Ministre of Finance	Louis Buffet until 14 April 1870 Alexis Segris from 14 April 1870
Minister of the Interior	Eugène Chevandier de Valdrôme
Minister of the Arts (from 15 May 1870)	Maurice Richard
Minister of the Imperial Household	Jean-Baptiste Philibert Vaillant
