= Palikao =

Palikao could mean:

- Tighennif, Mascara, Algeria — a town also known as Palikao
- Baliqiao — a bridge and surrounding suburb of Beijing, China
- Charles Cousin-Montauban, Comte de Palikao — 31st Prime Minister of France, whose nobility name was given to the new town of Tighennif in 1870
