= Cousin-Montauban ministry =

French government ministry in 1870

Cousin-Montauban
- 4th ministry of the Second French Empire

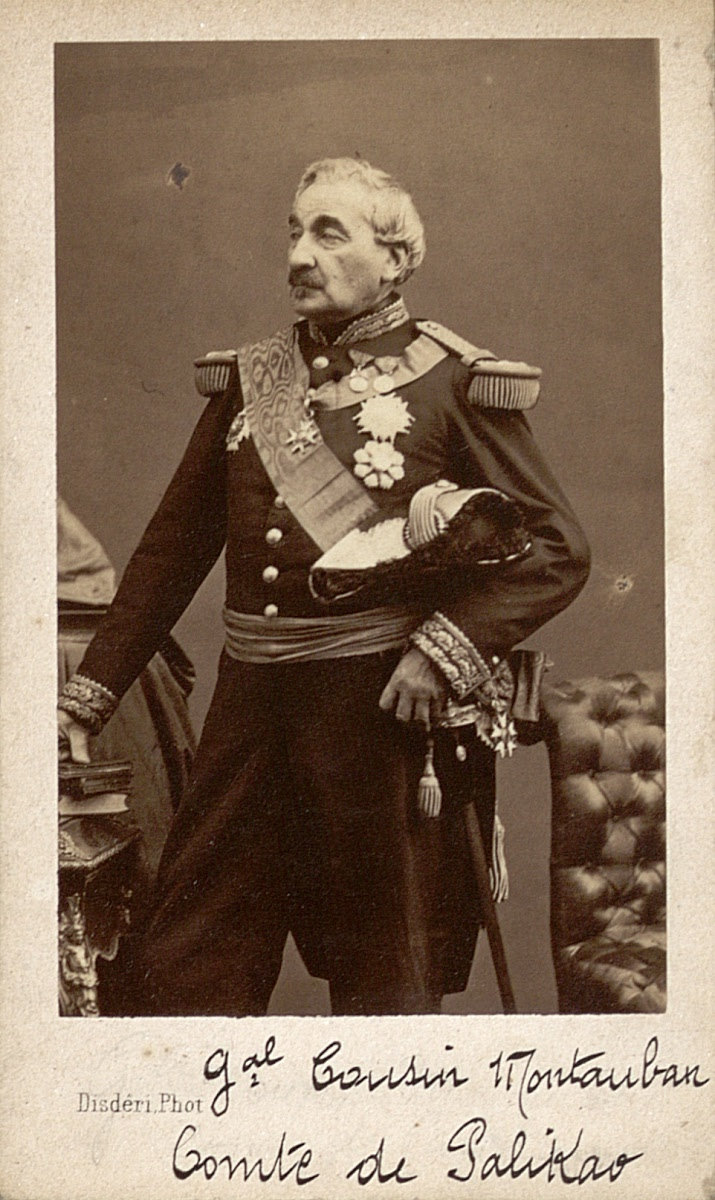
- Charles Cousin-Montauban, Comte de Palikao
- Date formed: 10 August 1870
- Date dissolved: 4 September 1870

People and organisations
- Head of government: Charles Cousin-Montauban

History
- Predecessor: Ollivier
- Successor: National Defense

The Cousin-Montauban ministry was the last government of the Second French Empire. It lasted from 10 August to 4 September 1870. It was formed by Empress Eugenie in an attempt to rally France's defences against the invading Prussians. The ministry was forced out of power following the French defeat at the Battle of Sedan.

== Composition ==
- Head of government: Charles Cousin-Montauban
- President of the Council of State: Julien Busson-Billault
- Minister of War: Charles Cousin-Montauban
- Minister of Agriculture and Trade: Clément Duvernois
- Minister of Public Works: Jérôme David
- Minister of Education: Jules Brame (and of the Arts from 23 August 1870)
- Minister of the Navy Colonies: Charles Rigault de Genouilly
- Minister of Foreign Affairs: Henri La Tour d'Auvergne
- Minister of Justice and Religious Affairs: Michel Grandperret
- Minister of Finance: Pierre Magne
- Minister of the Interior: Henri Chevreau
