= Paul Chevandier de Valdrome =

French painter

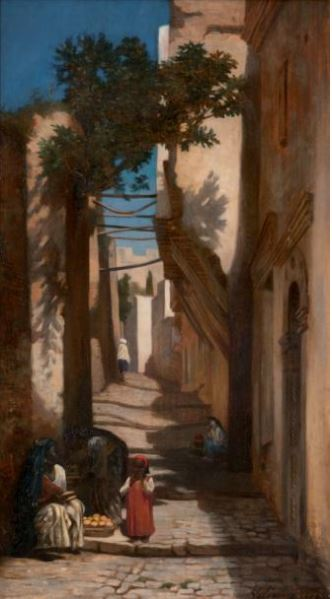
Orange Seller in a Moroccan Alley

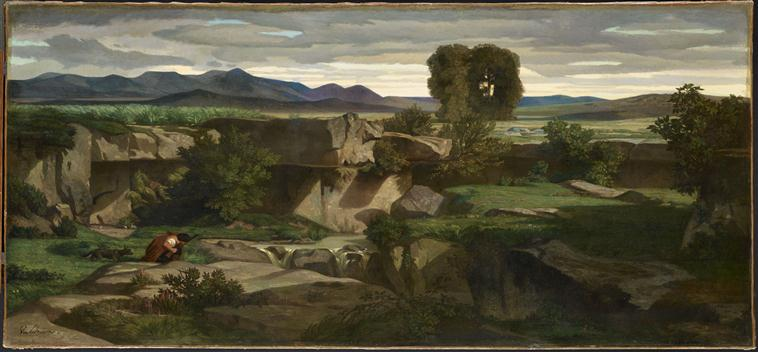
Landscape: The Plain of Rome

Paul Antoine Marie Chevandier de Valdrome (17 March 1817, in Saint-Quirin – 2 September 1877, in Hautot-sur-Mer) was a French landscape painter in the Neoclassical style. He also created a few Orientalist works and was a prominent art collector.

== Biography ==
His father, Jean Auguste Chevandier de Valdrome, was a Master glassmaker who was also a politician; serving as a member of Parliament from 1821 to 1837, and the Chamber of Peers after that. His brother, Eugène Chevandier de Valdrôme, briefly served as Minister of the Interior under Napoleon III.

He studied art with Prosper Marilhat and François-Édouard Picot, but was especially influenced by the landscape painter, Louis-Nicolas Cabat, whom he accompanied on a trip to Italy from 1836 to 1837, following his first exhibit at the Salon. They became lifelong friends. He would continue to travel throughout his life; notably visiting Constantine, Algeria, in 1847.

His Paris studio was in Montmartre and became a meeting place for many notables, such as Félix Ziem, Prince Edmond de Polignac and Frédéric Chopin, who is said to have been inspired to write his Piano Sonata No. 2 during a visit there, when he saw a skeleton that Chevandier was using as a model.

In 1868, against the wishes of his family, he married Jeanne Émilie Lelarge (1845-1898), an actress who performed at the Théâtre de l'Ambigu-Comique and the Théâtre de la Porte Saint-Martin under the stage name Jeanne (or Émilie) Defodon. Three years earlier, they had produced an illegitimate son, Paul Auguste Armand (1865-1914).

He was named a Chevalier in the Legion of Honor in 1869. During the Franco-Prussian War, he sent his family to safety, but remained behind and helped convert a hotel into a hospital for the wounded. After the war, they reunited and travelled to Switzerland for a vacation, then settled in Marseille.

Soon, however, Jeanne began a liaison with a certain "Baron" Marx Von Pforstein. This resulted in a judicial separation and Paul moved to the North Coast with Armand. After Paul's death Armand, still only twelve, was placed in the custody of the Dominican Fathers in Arcueil; under the supervision of his uncle Eugène. In 1878, Jeanne made an unsuccessful attempt to kidnap Armand during a parental visit, creating a scandal that was covered widely in the press. Armand went on to become a diplomat. In 1914, he was murdered at the French Embassy in Tangier, by a cook who had been dismissed for alcoholism.
