= Charles Bonaventure Marie Toullier =

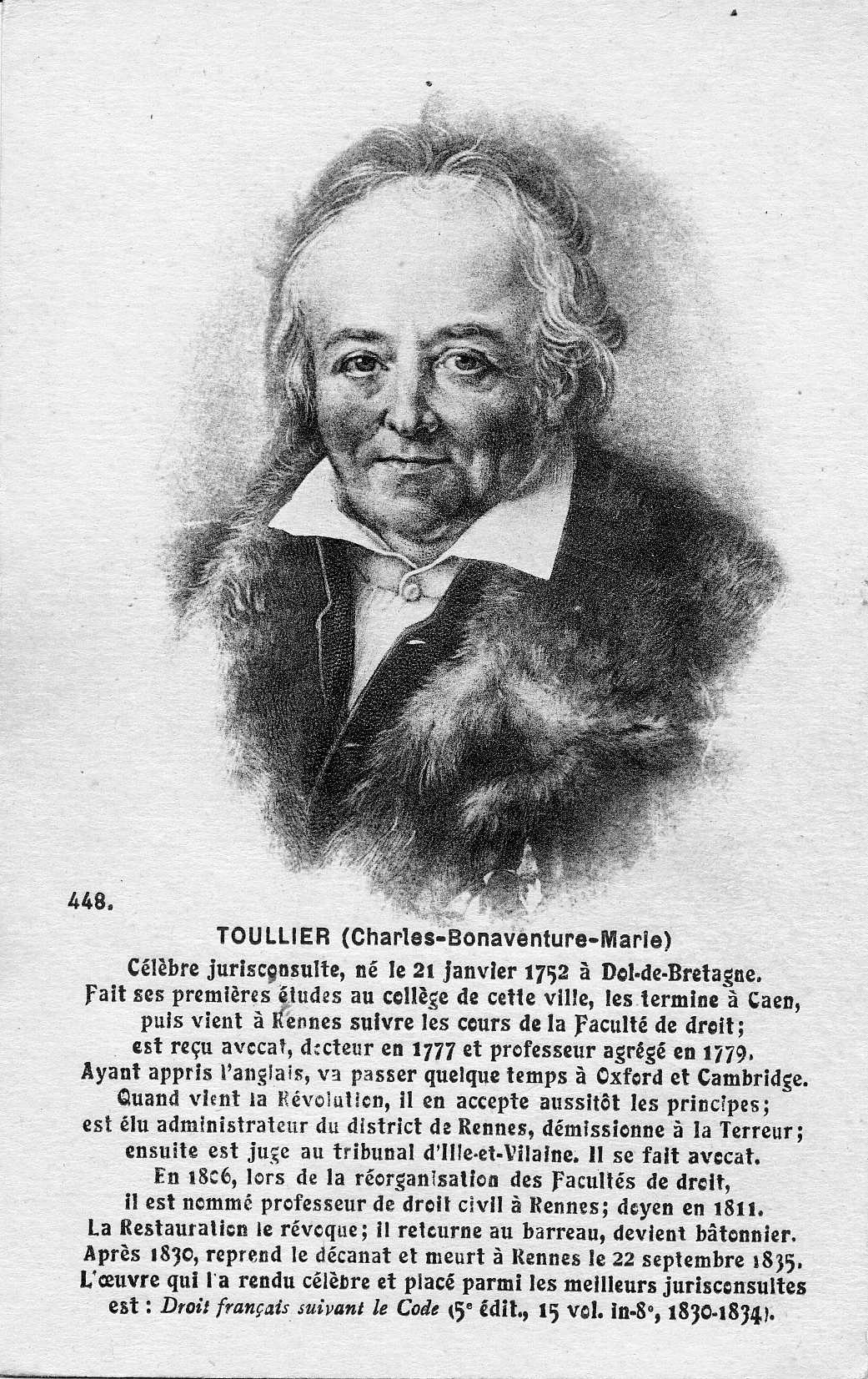
Charles Bonaventure Marie Toullier

Charles Bonaventure Marie Toullier, born 21 January 1752 in Dol-de-Bretagne, died in Rennes on 19 September 1835, was a French Jurisconsult. He is cited significantly in Proudhon's seminal work What Is Property?.

== Biography ==
=== The period of the Ancien Régime ===
Raised by his mother, he went to secondary school in Caen, then studied at the university of Rennes, whose faculty includes then Messrs. Loncle, Drouin, Loisel, Auguste-Marie Poullain-Duparc. He earned his doctorate at twenty-five, December 28, 1776, then April 12, 1778, through the competition, the title of associate professor at the University of Rennes. He then completed his studies in the universities of Oxford and Cambridge, where he draws some ideas of legislation compared, that he would later use. He held his Professorship until the Revolution.

=== The French Revolution ===
Patriot 1789, it is not without pleasure beginnings like most lawyers, trained in the school of Montesquieu, French and Voltaire and the English representative system and the principles of 1789 Toullier of district administrator for some time, but he was soon dismissed from his position. During the Reign of Terror, he is very dedicated to his brother, priest not sworn, pursued by Carrier and tracked down pension in retirement. He bought the Manor of Saint-Armel in Bruz.

He became a judge of the Court of Ille-et-Vilaine, then comes back to the bar and defended before the courts and councils of war several accused for political reasons. 1799, its name is carried on a list of hostages to the exile and detention, but he is saved by the coup d'état of 18 brumaire. Of many disputes between the State and the families of emigrants are referred to arbitration.

=== The Napoleonic period ===
Appointed professor in the reorganization of the university, he was appointed professor during the reorganization of the university and sought the Chair of Roman law, but was instead appointed to French law. Following this, he produced a series of works based on his lectures and notes. composed by him, and his notebooks, written for his classes, contained the germ.

1811 (it was almost sixty years), he began the publication of his book, and he received his appointment to the deanery, with a flattering letter of Fontanes, then grand master of the university. We know that political views have always raised many storms in Britain, and especially in Rennes.

=== The restoration ===
Toullier life remains dedicated to his duties as a professor and the completion of this important work. She is troubled by a mishap to which he devoted a quite strong preface placed in front of its eighth volume.

1816, students used tablets of wood to collect notes, following the course. Was found on these shelves of rebus species, initial letters that could explain in several senses, which was infinitely criminal (it's even Toullier who says). The police was educated early teachers; the tablets were seized and it punishes the guilty judged student. Toullier realized that's the Commission of public instruction, to which the report of the Commissioner of police was sent. 31 December 1816, she made a decree which suspended his duties as Dean Toullier, "" seen wearing minutes he had found in the audiences of the Faculty of law of the injurious inscriptions to the legitimate Government, and waited. "the students were not properly monitored and that he not them had not been inspired feelings such as the State was entitled to expect".

An order on February 5, 1817, named a commission to inform against the guilty students. The King reserved to know his will against the teachers. An inspector was sent to Rennes; the denouncements were made against teachers. A Committee of some people was consulted, and all was finished by a report in which Toullier was not criminalized, but Jean-Marie Emmanuel Legraverend was dismissed February 12, 1817. Then Jacques-Joseph Corbière, who then was Minister of the Interior, was presented for the vacant chair. «"We had always wanted, said Toullier, see Mr. of Corbiere among us.» He is a student of our old faculties; I had been his examiner during his thesis of license, April 3, 1788... All of my colleagues share my feelings for him. He was introduced... " "If Toullier wanted the appointment of Mr. of Corbiere, he did not expect him awarded the Dean, which left her with only the title of Dean of age and services. Here is the explanation Toullier give thereby: "" the talents of Mr. of Corbiere had developed in the National Gallery, he was regarded as one of the leaders of the opposition. " He had energi-manifest regimes, in the gallery and in printed reports, opinions contrary to the university. The president of the commission knew him a lot; Maybe he wanted to win a formidable opponent, because it was expected to see strongly attacking the university. " »

The preface to Toullier, where we have drawn this story, acknowledges that Mr. of Corbiere could be named Dean, the three years of the old deanery being expired. Toullier complains only for having been accused and sentenced without proof. In addition, the appointment of Mr. of Corbiere had not preceded the presentation of two candidates, as was the order of the 17 February 1818. Toullier does not fail to remind note that, some time ago, in a similar circumstance, the confreres of Victor Proudhon in Dijon had refused to replace it. The Dean's office was visited Toullier in 1830. He died at Rennes on 19 September 1835. He was President of the Association of lawyers of this city and member of the order of the medal of honor.

1864, rue Toullier in the 5th arrondissement of Paris, of the Paris law school and Sorbonne, was renamed in tribute. Since 2012, one of the amphitheaters of the Faculty of law and science policy the name of Charles Toullier reindeer door.

== Publications ==
The first eight volumes of his work have been published 1811 to 1818:

1. "French civil law following the order of the Napoleonic Code, book in which we tried to bring together the theory to practice", Paris, 1811–1831, 14 vol. in - 8 °;
2. "Supplement to the first edition of the first eight volumes of the french civil law", Paris, 1820, strong vol. in - 8 °. 1821 to 1823 appeared in the 9 to 11 volumes, with a general table at the end of the 11th volume. 1826 to 1831, the volumes 12 to 14 (marriage contract) with table. The "Library Journal" gives the following for other editions: 2nd edition, 1820, t. 1-3 and 6; 3rd edition. nihil; 4th edition., 1824, Paris, t. l to 4, 6 to 9, 10 copies on paper vellum; the first twelve volumes are dated but Mr. Quérard guess that titles were reprinted. Two tables, one of the subjects and other articles of the code dealt with in the book, are due to Mr. Morel, successor of Toullier. 5th edition., Paris, J. Renouard. 1837, vol. in - 8 °; t. 15, table of contents by Mr. Martin Jouaust, 1834, in - 8 ° Toullier explained only half about the code. Troplong, civil law explained following the order of the articles of the code, since and including the title of the sale; book which follows that of Toullier; 23 volumes in - 8 °, 1831–1852... -Toullier, French civil law following the order of the code, book in which we tried to bring together the theory to practice, 6th edition, continued and annotated by Jean-Baptiste Duvergier, 1846–1848, 14 vol. in - 8 °; continuation of the 6th edition of the civil law, by Toullier, 6 vol. in - 8 °. Toullier's book has been translated into German, Frankfurt; in Italian, Naples; There were three Belgian fakes, 1829, 13 vol. in - 8 °, titled 3rd edition; Vol. grand in - 8 °, 28 deliveries; 1834, flight, in - 8 °; praise of Toullier, pronounced 24 November 1836 to the resumption of the conferences of the order of lawyers, by Mr. Charles-Pierre-Paul Paulmier, lawyer ("Observer of the courts", journal of court documents, by Eugène Roch, t. 12).

The book of Toullier gave rise to the following publications:

1. "Dissertation on the art. 585 of the civil code, and refutation of the doctrine of Mr. Toullier on a question born of this article ", by the lead, London, in - 8 °, 64 pages.
2. "Annotations critical on the doctrine of Toullier in his treatise on the french civil law, following the order of the code, collected on the first five volumes containing the material of the first and second in the third book of the civil code, by j.. Spinnael, a lawyer at the Supreme Court of justice, Brussels, Ghent and Lille, 1825, in - 8 ° of v and 193 pages;
3. "Annotations, etc., collected on the volumes 6 to 11, containing the material of title 3, 3rd book code, by. the same ", Ghent, Debuscher and son; Lille, 1825, in - 8 ° of v and 147 pages.
4. "Letters to Mr. Toullier, etc., on some mistakes contained in title 12 of the course of law french, related to the community of the spouses", by M. Guevel, Paris, 1828, in - 8 ° of pages; a first in the same letter, 1827, - 8 ° 16 pages. These letters and comments of Mr. demand, in the "Themis", on the doctrine of Toullier, as for the marriage, have been combined under this title: "Appendix to volume 12 of the french civil law", by Mr. Toullier, Brussels, 1828, in - 8 °. Toullier and Merlin mark the transition between the new and the old doctrine. The directory of case law applies the principles to the species; Toullier is theoretical. Toullier boasted with reason for introducing philosophy in the study of law; There point of view to which it still belongs. His style is clear, much important quality in a Jurisconsult, and if he's sometimes diffuse, it is not devoid of elegance. The book lack of proportion: the beginnings are not developed, but the "Treaty on the property and its amendments" announces the author of the 'treaty obligations'. In his "treaty obligations", he surpassed Pothier, said M. Dupin ("letters on the legal profession"), calling him the "modern Pothier". It is, he says, the most perfect of the works that have appeared on the code. "According to Merlin, Toullier is wiser, more strongly reasoned and better distributed than Pothier. The "Treaty of the marriage contract" following is far worth the 'treaty obligations'; He feels the old age of the author.

== Sources ==
- Louis Gabriel Michaud. "name". Biographie universelle ancienne et moderne : histoire par ordre alphabétique de la vie publique et privée de tous les hommes avec la collaboration de plus de 300 savants et littérateurs français ou étrangers (in French) (2 ed.).
