= Grandperret =

Grandperret is a French surname. Notable people with the surname include:

- Patrick Grandperret (1946–2019), French film director, screenwriter, and producer
- Théodore Grandperret (1818–1890), French lawyer and politician
