= Louis Le Provost de Launay =

French politician

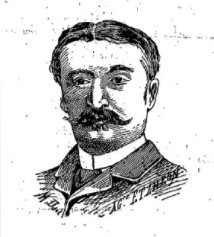
- Le Provost de Launay from Le Palais-Bourbon et le Luxembourg: gazette parlementaire 1898

Deputy for Côtes-du-Nord
- In office 20 February 1876 – 14 October 1893

Senator for Côtes-du-Nord
- In office 16 February 1896 – 17 August 1912

Personal details
- Born: 8 June 1850 Libourne, Gironde, France
- Died: 17 August 1912 (aged 62) Aix-les-Bains, Savoie, France
- Occupation: Politician

Louis Le Provost de Launay (8 June 1850 – 17 August 1912) was a French politician who was Deputy and then Senator for the department of Côtes-du-Nord (now called Côtes-d'Armor). He was a right-wing Bonapartist.

== Early years ==
Louis Le Provost de Launay was born on 8 June 1850 in Libourne, Gironde. His father was Auguste-Pierre-Marie Le Provost de Launay (1823–1886). His father was a prefect of the Second French Empire who was elected a representative in the National Assembly in 1874, deputy from 1877 to 1881, and senator from 1885 to 1886. Louis Le Provost de Launay studied law in Paris and obtained his license. For a period he was secretary to Théodore Grandperret. At the start of the Franco-Prussian War of 1870 he joined the Chasseurs d'Afrique as a private soldier, and later was made a sub-officer. After the war he received his doctorate in law and was admitted to the Bar in 1872.

== Local politics ==
In 1875 Le Provost de Launay was elected general councilor for Côtes-du-Nord representing the canton of La Roche-Derrien. He was elected mayor of Penvénan on 18 May 1884. He was replaced on 10 December 1893 by Pierre Le Provost de Launay. In 1895 Le Provost de Launay, afraid of losing his seat in the general council, moved from the canton of La Roche to the canton of Tréguier. In 1901 he was defeated in the cantonal elections and lost Tréguier to Gustave de Kerguézec^{(fr)}, who was later elected a radical deputy in 1906.

== Deputy ==
Le Provost de Launay was elected to the Chamber of Deputies for Côtes-du-Nord on 20 February 1876. He was elected deputy for the 2nd constituency of Lannion, Côtes-du-Nord, by 7,076 votes to 4,237 for M. Le Gac. In the chamber Le Provost de Launay was prominent in the Appel au peuple group led by Paul de Cassagnac, and was active in opposition to the republicans led by Léon Gambetta. He supported the government of 16 May.

After being reelected unopposed on 14 October 1877 he voted against the cabinet of Dufaure and against the left-wing cabinets that succeeded it. He was against the amnesty of the leaders of the Paris Commune. Le Provost de Launay was again reelected without competition on 21 August 1881. He was involved in discussions on the budget, public education, colonial policy and state railways. His 1883 proposal to drop the requirement for municipalities to have a rural guard passed into law the next year. He voted against the Gambetta, Freycinet, and Jules Ferry ministries and against the credits for the Tonkin expedition.

When the right-wing Ligue des Patriotes was created in 1882, members of the Appel au Peuple committee were present at the constitutive general assembly, as were Blanquists, revisionists, members of the Jeunesse Antisémite and members of Jules Guérin's Antisemitic League of France. Le Provost de Launay and Jules de Cuverville, both prominent Bonapartists, were members of the steering committee. On 4 October 1885 Le Provost de Launay ran on the conservative list in Côtes-du-Nord and was elected first out of nine. He voted against reinstatement of the district poll, for indefinite postponement of revision of the Constitution, against prosecution of three members of the Ligue des Patriotes, against the draft Lisbonne law restricting freedom of the press and against the prosecution of General Boulanger.

Le Provost de Launay was reelected on 22 September 1889, holding office until 14 October 1893, again sitting with the Conservative Union group. He again represented the second constituency of Lannion and was again elected without opposition. He continued to attack the republican regime, including during the debates over the conquest of Dahomey. He and Jules Delahaye brought up the Panama scandals, and he made a speech in which he denounced the manipulations of the so-called 104 parliamentarians. This proved fatal to him, and both he and Delahaye failed to be reelected in 1893. Le Provost de Launay was defeated by the republican candidate Paul Le Troadec, who won 5,578 votes to his 4,843. His opponent was a farmer who was Mayor of Lézardrieux and a general councilor.

== Senator ==
Le Provost de Launay was elected to the Senate on 16 February 1896. He defeated the Marquis de L'Angle Beaumanoir by 894 votes to 337 in a by-election. He sat on the right, and was energetically opposed to colonial expeditions. He again intervened on the Panama scandals. He was very active in the debates over the Dreyfus affair. Le Provost de Launay was reelected on 4 January 1903 and 7 January 1912. In the Senate he continued to oppose the republicans. In May 1903 he called on the government to regulate the use of automobiles on public roads. He was involved in questions related to army, opposed to excessively harsh treatment of soldiers but concerned that common criminals should be dismissed. He was also concerned with defending free education and the separation of church and state.

Louis Le Provost de Launay died in office on 17 August 1912 in Aix-les-Bains, Savoie.

== Publications ==
The Bibliothèque nationale de France lists 34 documents published by Le Provost de Launay, mostly a few pages extracted from an official journal that give the text of a speech or legislative proposal. More significant publications include:

- Louis Le Provost de Launay (1881), A MM. les électeurs des cantons de La Roche, Légardrieux, Perros et Tréguier, qui ont bien voulu me donner, le 2 février 1876, 7076 suffrages sur 11350 votants, et, le 14 octobre 1877, 10001 suffrages sur 10800 votants, Paris: P. Dupont, p. 75
- Louis Le Provost de Launay (1887), A messieurs les électeurs des cantons de la Roche, Lézardrieux, Perros et Tréguier qui ont bien voulu me donner le 2 février 1876, 7.076 suffrages sur 11.350 votants..., Paris: P. Dupont
- Louis Le Provost de Launay (1889), Manuel des lois de l'enseignement primaire, commentaires, application et jurisprudence à l'usage des conseils élus, des municipalités, des écoles et des pères de famille, Paris: Gaume, p. 657

== Sources ==
- Forestier, Yann (2006), "La Séparation des Églises et de l'État, accélérateur de la mutation politique du Trégor", Les Bretons et la Séparation: 1795-2005 (in French), Presses universitaires de Rennes, pp. 275–287, doi:10.4000/books.pur.23591, ISBN 9782753523579
- Jolly, Jean, ed. (1960–1977), "Le Provost de Launay, Louis", Dictionnaire des parlementaires français; notices biographiques sur les ministres, députés et sénateurs français de 1889 à 1940 (in French), Paris: Presses universitaires de France, ISBN 978-2-1100-1998-1
- Larousse, Pierre (1866–1877), "LE PROVOST DE LAUNAY (Auguste-Pierre-Marie)", Grand dictionnaire universel du XIXe siècle: français, historique, géographique, mythologique, bibliographique, vol. 17, Paris: Administration du grand Dictionnaire universel
- Louis Le Provost de Launay (in French), Assemblée nationale
- Louis Le Provost de Launay (1850–1912) (in French), BnF: Bibliothèque nationale de France
- Moro, Jean (22 January 1898), "M. Louis LE PROVOST de LAUNAY", Le Palais-Bourbon et le Luxembourg: Gazette Parlementaire (in French)
- Robert, Adolphe; Cougny, Gaston (1889–1891), "LE PROVOST DE LAUNAY (louis)", in Edgar Bourloton (ed.), Dictionnaire des Parlementaires français (1789–1889) (in French)
- Robert, Adolphe; Cougny, Gaston (1889–1891b), "LE PROVOST DE LAUNAY (AUGUSTE-PIERRE)", in Edgar Bourloton (ed.), Dictionnaire des Parlementaires français (1789–1889) (in French)
- Tombs, Robert (2 September 2003), Nationhood and Nationalism in France: From Boulangism to the Great War 1889–1918, Routledge, ISBN 978-1-134-99796-1
