= Pierre Charles Dejean =

French general and politician

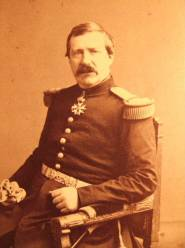
Pierre Charles Dejean

Charles Pierre Dejean, vicomte (16 February 1807, Paris – 30 July 1872, Paris) was a French general and politician.

== Life ==
Dejean was the son of General Pierre François Marie Auguste Dejean. He was Major General of Engineering, and State Councilor and on 20 July 1870, became Minister of War ad interim as a replacement of Marshal Edmond Leboeuf, who became chief to the General Staff of Army of the Rhine. Dejean served as Minister of War ad interim from 20 July 1870 to 10 August 1870 in the government of Émile Ollivier. He was a member of the Committee of Fortifications at his elevation to the rank of Grand Officer of the Legion of Honor on 29 April 1871.

== Family ==
Dejean married Mathilde de Gueully de Rumigny on 24 April 1834, the couple had four children:

- Jeanne Claire (1835–1876)
- Gabrielle (1837–1906) married Jean-Baptiste Alexandre Montaudon
- Charles Benjamin Dieudonné (1840–1893)
- Lucie (1855–1874)

Political offices
Preceded by Edmond Le Bœuf	Minister of War; 20 July 1870 – 10 August 1870	Succeeded by Charles Cousin-Montauban, Comte de Palikao
