= Marcel Vacherot =

French tennis player

- Country (sports): France
- Born: 11 February 1881; Neuilly-sur-Seine, France
- Died: 24 May 1975 (aged 94); Pau, France

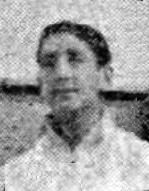
Marcel Vacherot in 1901 (Tennis Club de Paris).jpg

Marcel Gustave Arsène Vacherot (11 February 1881 – 24 May 1975) was a tennis player. He competed for France.

His elder brother André Vacherot was an even more successful tennis player, winning the French Championships six times (four singles and two doubles). The two brothers were grandsons of the French philosopher Étienne Vacherot.

Vacherot won the men's doubles final of the Amateur French Championships in 1898 along with Xenophon Kasdaglis and in 1901 along with his brother André. In 1902 he won the singles final over Max Decugis.
