= Théodore Grandperret =

French lawyer and politician

Michel Etienne Anthelme Théodore Grandperret

Minister of Justice
- In office 10 August 1870 – 4 September 1870
- Preceded by: Émile Ollivier
- Succeeded by: Adolphe Crémieux

Minister of Religious Affairs
- In office 10 August 1870 – 4 September 1870
- Preceded by: Émile Ollivier
- Succeeded by: Jules Simon

Life Senator
- In office 24 November 1877 – 6 January 1890

Personal details
- Born: 26 January 1818 Caluire, Rhône, France
- Died: 6 January 1890 (aged 71) Paris, France
- Occupation: Lawyer, politician

Michel Etienne Anthelme Théodore Grandperret (26 January 1818 – 6 January 1890) was a French lawyer and politician. He was a staunch Bonapartist. He served briefly as Minister of Justice and Religious Affairs during the last weeks of the Second French Empire. Later he was a Life Senator from 1877 to his death.

== Early years (1818–1851) ==
Théodore Grandperret was born in Caluire, Rhône, on 26 January 1818. His parents were Claude-Louis Grandperret (1791–1854), a teacher and school inspector, and Caroline Amélie Mollet (1793–1858). He studied Law in Paris and in 1844 joined the bar in Lyon. He became a laureate and then a member of the Académie de Lyon for his first essays on local history and literature. He contributed theatre reviews to the Courrier de Lyon and wrote for the Journal du Rhône, directed by his father. In 1849 he became a magistrate as substitute for the Court of First Instance of Lyon.

On 2 June 1851 Grandperret married Alexandrine Emanuelle Félicie Martin (1826–1872) at Saint-Jean-le-Vieux, Ain. Their children were Louis Charles Emmanuel Grandperret (1852–1890) and Charles Antoine Grandperret (1856–1931).

== Second Empire (1852–1870) ==
In 1852 Grandperret was attached to the Lyon public prosecutor's office. He was general council at Bourges in 1855 and Toulouse in 1859. In 1861 he was appointed Attorney General at Orléans, where he met Mgr. Félix Dupanloup. In 1867 he was appointed Attorney General at Paris in place of Louis François Chabanacy de Marnas^{(fr)}. Soon afterwards he was appointed to the Council of State. In 1868 he was awarded the Cross of the Legion of Honour. He was known for his indictment in the Troppmann affair in December 1869.

In the trial of Prince Pierre Napoléon Bonaparte for homicide on 21 May 1871 Grandperret served as Attorney General at the High Court convened in Tours. His evident bias towards the Bonaparte family caused the lawyers of the Noir family to be called the "defense lawyers". Grandperret was the author of a report sent to the Keeper of the Seals on 5 May 1870 on a "conspiracy" against the life of the emperor discovered shortly before the plebiscite. He was reappointed Attorney General at the high court in Blois convened in July 1870 to investigate the conspiracy. The case was abandoned after the defeat at Wissembourg during the Franco-Prussian War of 1870. In the last weeks of the empire after the resignation of the cabinet of Émile Ollivier he accepted the portfolio of Minister of Justice in the cabinet of the Comte de Palikao, holding office from 10 August to 4 September 1870. As Minister he was Keeper of the Seals (Garde des sceaux).

== Third Republic (1870–1890) ==
After the fall of the empire Grandperret enrolled at the Paris bar and stayed out of politics for several years. As a lawyer between 1870 and 1877 Grandperret defended Paul de Cassagnac in the defamation suit lodged against him by General de Wimpffen. For a period Louis Le Provost de Launay (1850–1912), future deputy and senator, was Grandperret's secretary. Grandperret's first wife died on 26 January 1872 at the age of 45. On 25 September 1872 he married Claire Gabrielle Hectorine Blanhet (1822–1910).

On 15 November 1877 Grandperret was elected by the coalition of the right as Life Senator in place of Alphonse Lepetit^{(fr)}, who had died. Since there was no clear majority the election was annulled, but in a fresh election on 24 November 1877 he was elected by a clear majority against the republican candidate Victor Lefranc. He joined the Bonapartist Appel au peuple group and voted consistently with the right. He voted against the Jules Ferry laws on education, against reestablishment of divorce, against the exile of the princes, against reinstatement of the district poll, against the draft Lisbonne law restricting the freedom of the press and against the prosecution of General Boulanger. He held office until his death.

Théodore Grandperret died in Paris on 6 January 1890.

== Publications ==
Publications by Théodore Grandperret include:

- Théodore Grandperret (1843), Jus romanum : De impensis in res dotales factis etc. (Thèse pour la licence qui sera soutenue le lundi 13 novembre 1843), Lyon: Imprimerie de Marle aîné / Faculté de droit. Lyon, p. 24
- Théodore Grandperret (1843), De l'État politique de la ville de Lyon, depuis le Xe siècle jusqu'à l'année 1789 (Mémoire couronné par l'Académie des sciences, belles-lettres et arts), Lyon: impr. de Marle, p. 139
- Théodore Grandperret (1846), Éloge de Mme la Mise d'Aligre, Lyon: impr. de Chanoine, p. 69
- Théodore Grandperret (1850), Concours ouvert sur l'éloge de Châteaubriand par l'Académie de Lyon, Lyon: impr. de L. Boitel, p. 23
- Théodore Grandperret (1855), De la Détention préventive (Procès-verbal de l'audience solennelle de rentrée de la cour impériale de Lyon, le 3 novembre 1855), Lyon: impr. de L. Perrin, p. 54
- Théodore Grandperret (1856), De l'Histoire de l'éloquence judiciaire en France, au point de vue du ministère public (Procès-verbal de l'audience solennelle de rentrée de la cour impériale de Bourges, le 4 novembre 1856.), Bourges: impr. de E. Pigelet, p. 42
- Théodore Grandperret (1872), Plaidoirie ... dans le procès entre le général Trochu et MM. Vitu et de Villemessant, Paris: impr. de V. Goupy, p. 74
- Paul de Cassagnac; Théodore Grandperret (1875), Le procès de Belleville, précédé du Discours de la salle Graffard, Paris: E. Lachaud et Cie, p. 61

== Sources ==
- GRANDPERRET Théodore (in French), Sénat de France
- kdauphinetjegu, "Michel.Etienne.Anthelme.Théodore GRANDPERRET", geneanet
- Robert, Adolphe; Cougny, Gaston (1889–1891), "GRANDPERRET (MICHEL-ETIENNE-ANTHELME-THÉODORE)", in Edgar Bourloton (ed.), Dictionnaire des Parlementaires français (1789–1889) (in French)
- Robert, Adolphe; Cougny, Gaston (1889–1891b), "LE PROVOST DE LAUNAY (LOUIS)", in Edgar Bourloton (ed.), Dictionnaire des Parlementaires français (1789–1889) (in French)
- Théodore Grandperret (1818–1890) (in French), BnF: Bibliotheque nationale de France
