= Baliqiao =

Bridge in Beijing, People's Republic of China

Coordinates: 39°54′24″N 116°36′51″E

Yongtong Bridge (Yongtongqiao)
- Traditional Chinese: 永通橋
- Simplified Chinese: 永通桥
Transcriptions
Standard Mandarin
- Hanyu Pinyin: Yǒngtōng Qiáo

Bali Bridge (Baliqiao)
- Traditional Chinese: 八里橋
- Simplified Chinese: 八里桥
- Literal meaning: Eight Li Bridge
Transcriptions
Standard Mandarin
- Hanyu Pinyin: Bālǐ Qiáo

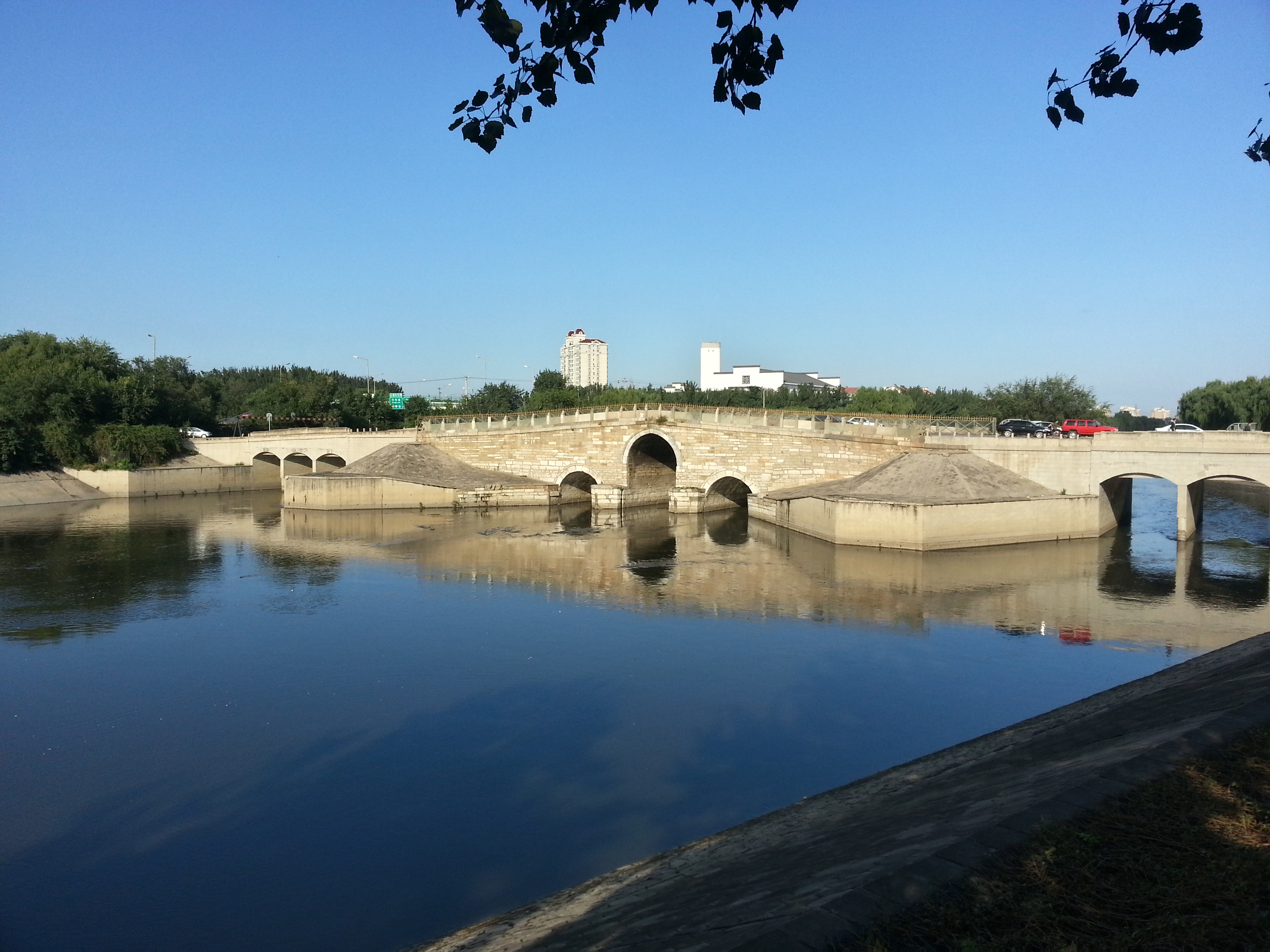
Baliqiao in 2013

Yongtongqiao, better known as Baliqiao (lit. 'Eight Li Bridge'; also Yongtong Bridge or Bali Bridge; formerly romanised as Palikao), is a historic bridge located at the intersection of Chaoyang and Tongzhou districts in the east of Beijing, China. It passes over the Tonghui River (通惠河).

== History ==
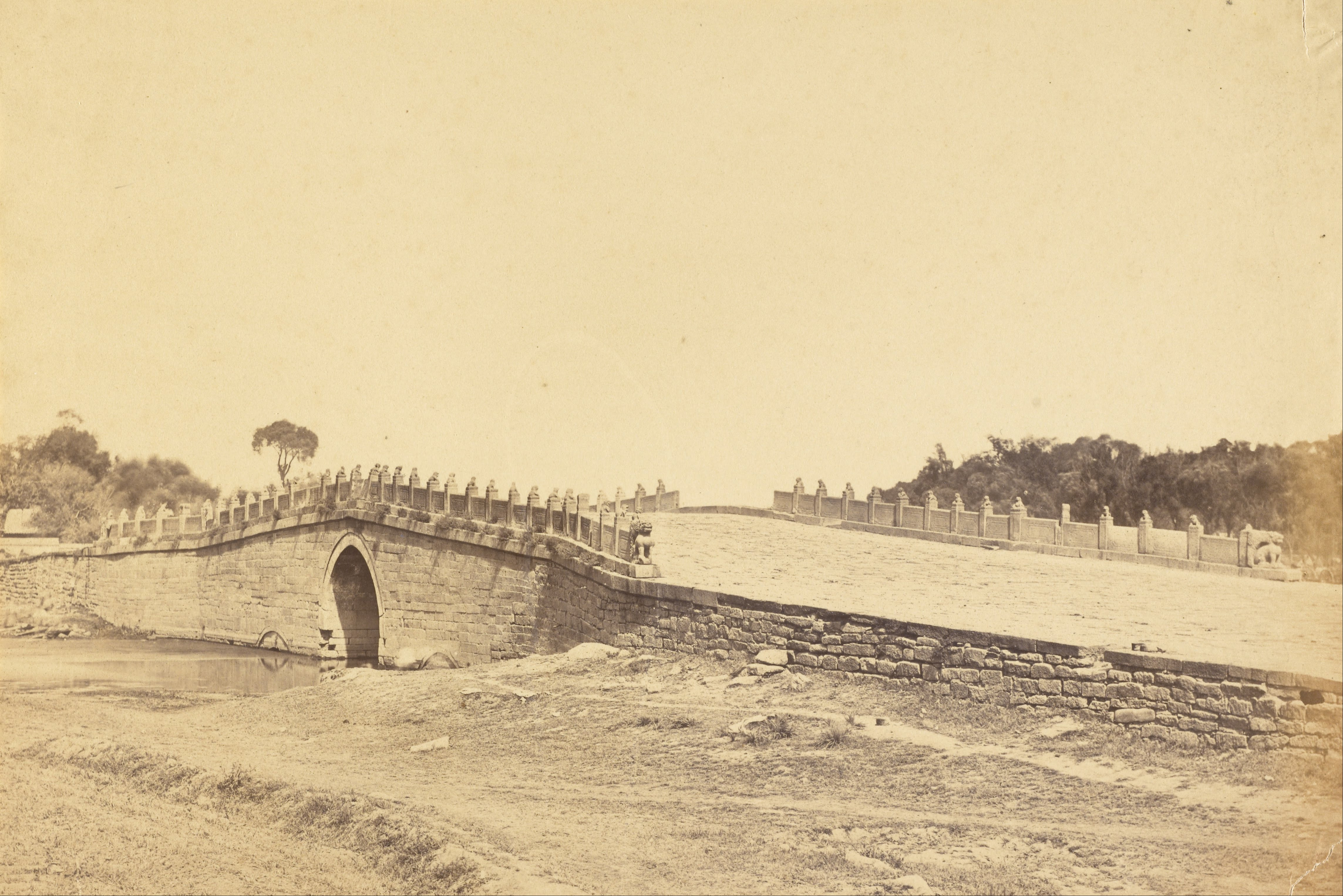
The bridge in 1860

The bridge is located exactly eight li (Chinese mile) from Tongzhou District in Beijing, hence it was called "Baliqiao" or "Eight Mile Bridge". It was once used as a marker of the outer boundary of the Imperial City of Beijing, beyond which was the former Zhili province.

A small palace and temple complex once stood near the bridge. When the Emperor travelled out of the Imperial City, he alighted from his jiao at the complex and rested there overnight before changing out of his elaborate imperial robes to plainer attire suited for travelling. When he returned from his trip, he stayed overnight at the complex again and changed back to his imperial robes before entering the Imperial City again.

The canal over which the bridge stands is connected to the Summer Palace. The Qianlong Emperor of the Qing dynasty started his six boat tours to the Jiangnan region from the bridge.

== Battle of Baliqiao ==
During the Second Opium War in 1860, on the morning of 21 September, a combined Anglo-French force that had recently occupied Tianjin engaged a Chinese army numbering some 30,000 strong at Baliqiao. A fierce battle ensued, with the Anglo-French force inflicting massive losses on the Chinese army and invading Beijing thereafter. Historians estimate the losses on the Chinese side as about 1,200. The French and British, in contrast, lost only five soldiers. The French troops were led by Charles Guillaume Cousin-Montauban, who was then awarded the title Count of Palikao by Napoleon III.

It was at the bridge where the Chinese imperial commissioners agreed to all the demands put forth by the British and French, including the payment of reparations and acceptance of foreign diplomats at the imperial court in Beijing.

== Baliqiao at present ==
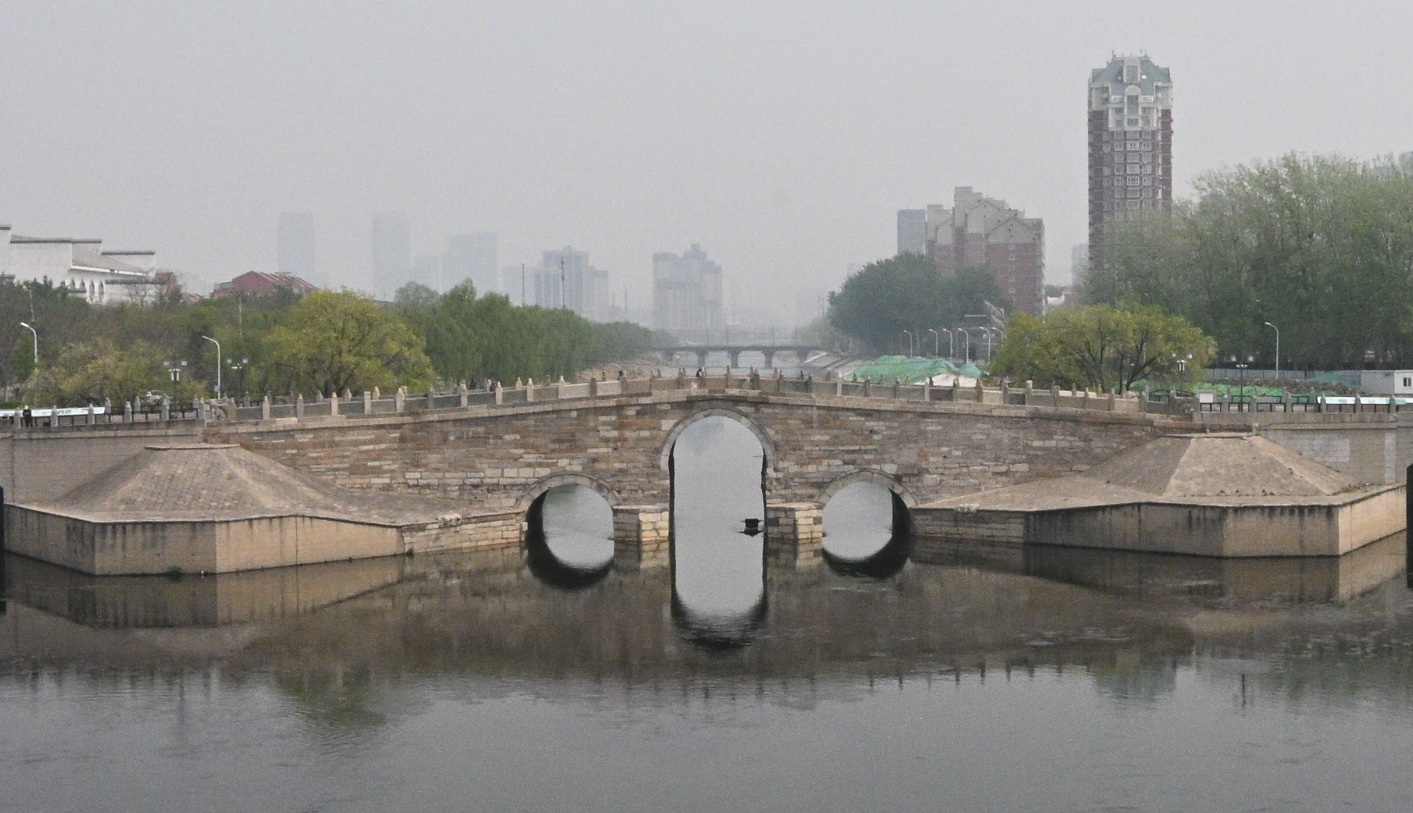
Yongtongqiao as seen from replacement bridge opened in 2018. Looking west. April 2025

Baliqiao currently stands at the juncture of the districts of Chaoyang and Tongzhou, and has a subway station served by the Batong line of the Beijing Subway. The Jingtong Expressway runs near the bridge.

A pavilion built in Qing dynasty style has been recently erected to protect the stelae with the Qianlong Emperor's calligraphy from the elements.

Nothing presently remains of the small temple and palace complex, but its location has been identified, and archaeologists are applying for permission to investigate the hitherto undisturbed site.

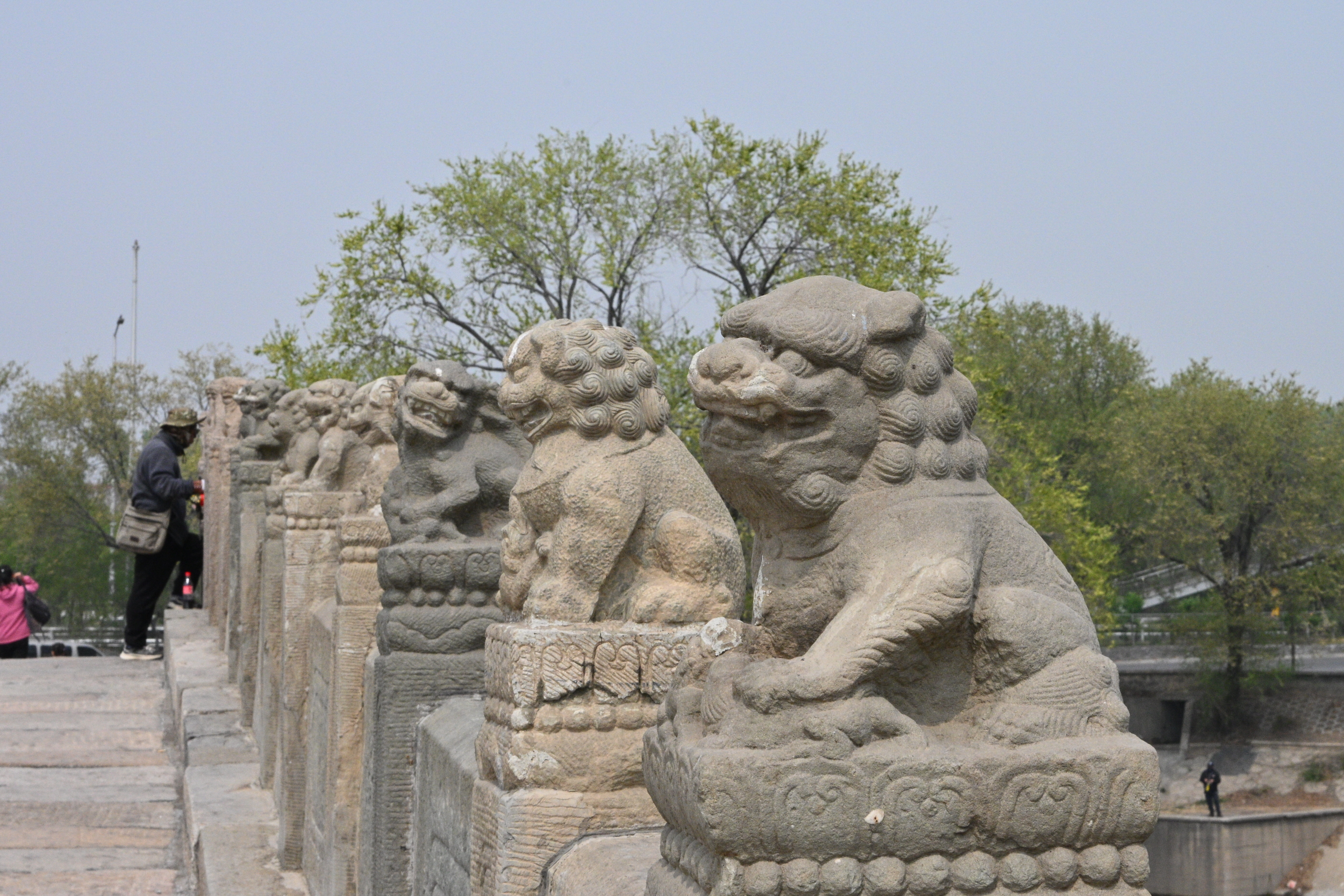
Restored lions on Yongtongqiao, April 2025

The bridge became neglected in the early 2000s, with graffiti and assorted bills marring its marble construction. Some of its surviving lion sculptures (similar to the lions decorating Lugou Bridge) had been damaged. In addition it was realised the bridge was being impacted by traffic on the bridge, and a modern concrete bridge was constructed just 152 meters away as an alternative route in 2018. From this date the historic bridge was closed to motor vehicles and bicycles.

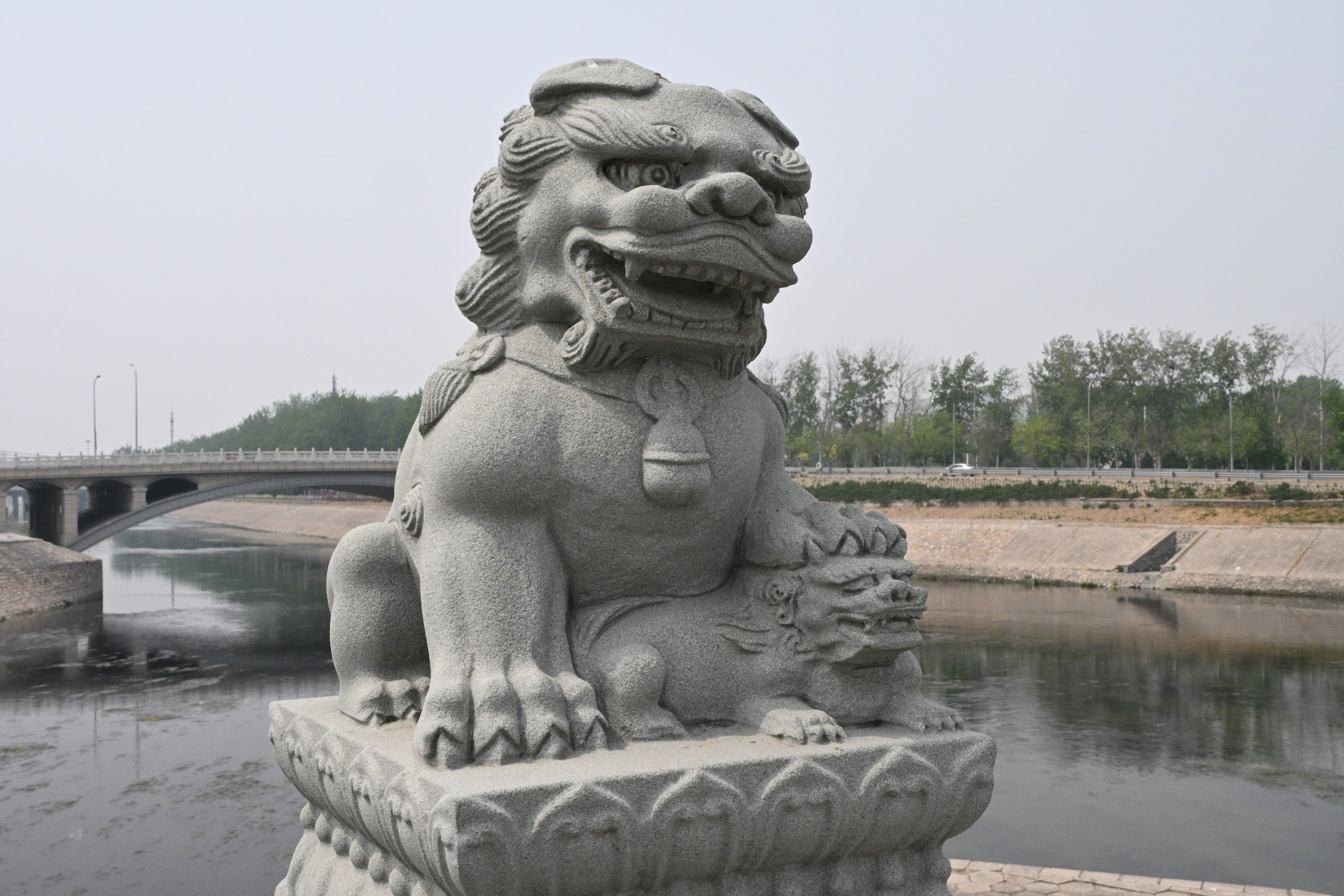
New lion on Yongtongqiao, April 2025

After thorough research by experts and the approval of authorities, the restoration work of the bridge started in 2021 and was finished in 2024, just in time to commemorate the 10th anniversary of the Grand Canal’s inclusion in the World Heritage List of UNESCO.

Currently access is restricted to all vehicles and is open to pedestrian traffic only. All the lion sculptures have been repaired or replaced and there is a permanent display of numerous plaques and signs. Included in this display are early drawings and photos of the bridge as well as extensive historical information.

A museum for the bridge and site was planned.

== Transport ==
- Bali Qiao station, Beijing Subway
