= Barenton =

- Commune
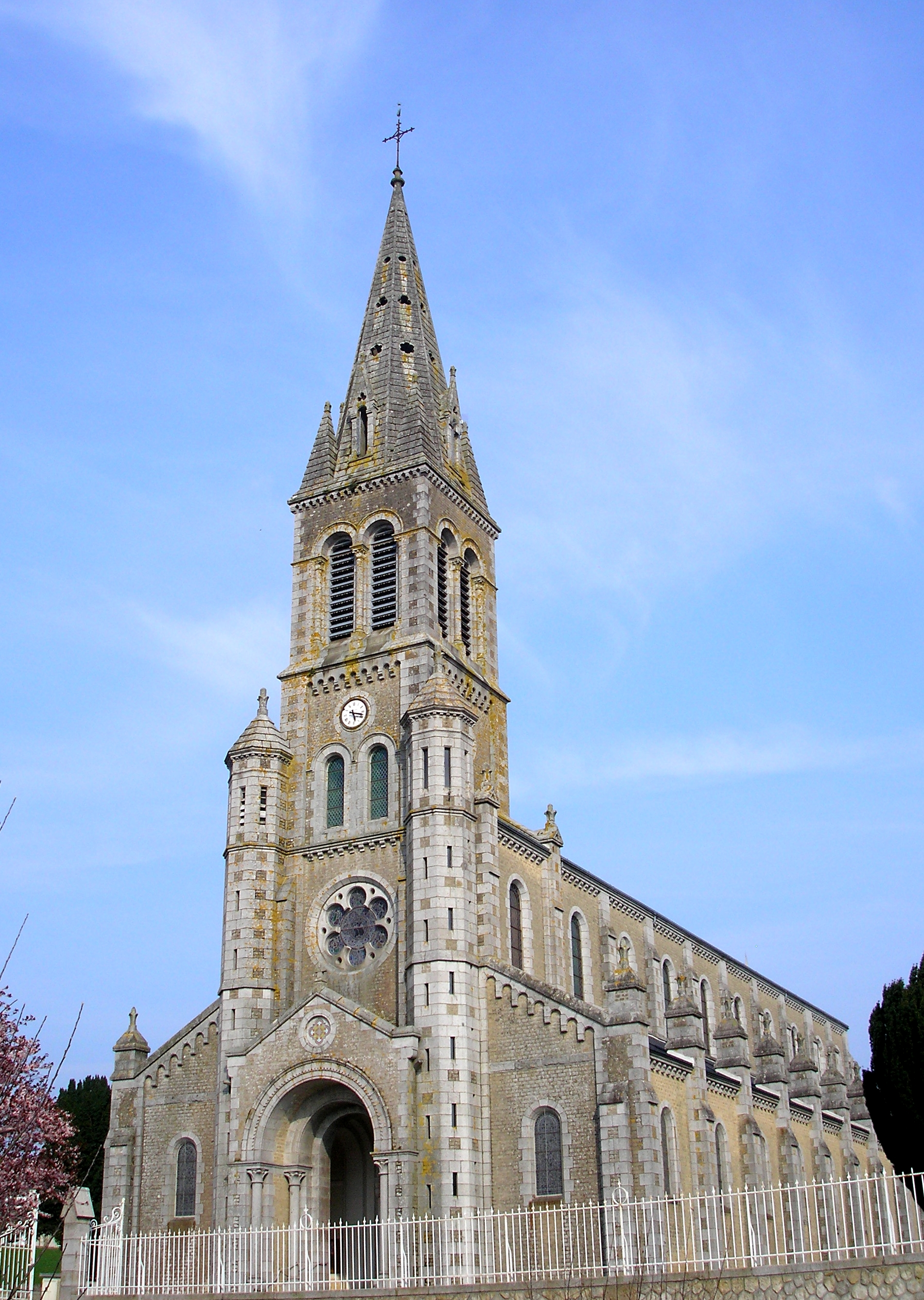
- The church in Barenton
- Location of Barenton
- Location within France Location within Normandy
- Coordinates: 48°36′00″N 0°49′51″W
- Country: France
- Region: Normandy
- Department: Manche
- Arrondissement: Avranches
- Canton: Le Mortainais
- Intercommunality: CA Mont-Saint-Michel-Normandie

Government
  - Mayor (2020–2026): Stéphane Lelièvre
- Area^{1}: 34.88 km^{2} (13.47 sq mi)
- Highest elevation: 297 m (974 ft)
- Lowest elevation: 88 m (289 ft)
- Population (2023): 1,161
  - Density: 33.29/km^{2} (86.21/sq mi)
- Time zone: UTC+01:00 (CET)
  - Summer (DST): UTC+02:00 (CEST)
- INSEE/Postal code: 50029 /50720
- ^{1} French Land Register data, which excludes lakes, ponds, glaciers > 1 km^{2} (0.386 sq mi or 247 acres) and river estuaries.

Barenton (French pronunciation: [baʁɑ̃tɔ̃]) is a commune in the Manche department in the Normandy region in northwestern France.

== Geography ==
The commune is made up of the following collection of villages and hamlets, Les Chesnaies, Bonsentier, Les Gouboudières, La Touchardière, Le Meslier, Barenton, Le Pont Poisson, Le Bignon, Meslé and Boudé.

The source of the river Sélune is in this commune.

The commune is in the Normandie-Maine Regional Natural Park.

== Points of Interest ==
=== Museums ===
- Musée du Poiré is a Museum of France dedicated to cider making. The museum is in a former farmhouse in the Norman bocage countryside, and has been open since 1983.

=== National Heritage sites ===
- Chapelle Notre-Dame-de-Montéglise - a sixteenth Century chapel, which was listed as a Monument historique in 1989.

== Notable people ==
- Guillaume Postel - (1510 – 1581) a linguist, Orientalist, astronomer, Christian Kabbalist, diplomat, polyglot, professor, religious universalist, and writer who was born in the commune.
- Catherine Théot - (1716 ー 1794) was a visionary who was born here.
- Arthur Legrand - (1833 – 1916) was a lawyer, public servant and politician who was elected to General Council of Manche for Barenton.
- Hilaire de Barenton - (1864 – 1946), a friar, linguist and historian of Middle Eastern languages was born here

== Twin towns ==
Barenton is twinned with:

- Puderbach, Germany, since 1970

== See also ==
- Communes of the Manche department
- Parc naturel régional Normandie-Maine
