= Arthur Legrand =

French lawyer, public servant and politician

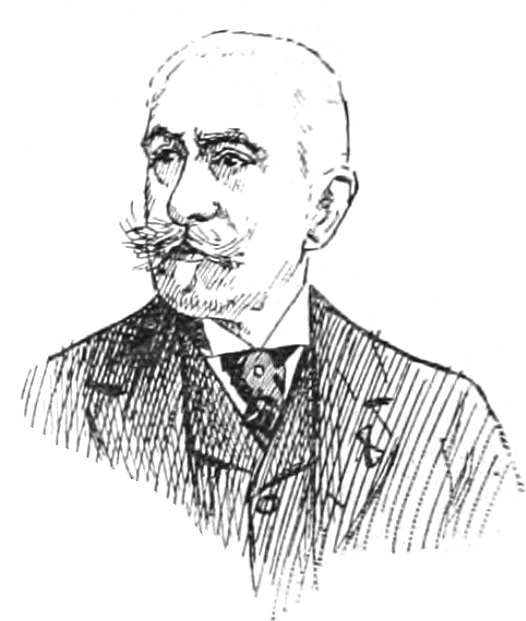
- Legrand from Le Monde moderne, December 1898

Representative of Manche
- In office 8 February 1871 – 7 March 1876

Deputy of Manche
- In office 20 February 1876 – 14 October 1885

Deputy of Manche
- In office 22 September 1889 – 8 May 1916

Personal details
- Born: Arthur Marie Alexis Legrand; 28 October 1833 Paris, France
- Died: 8 May 1916 (aged 82) Paris, France
- Occupation: Lawyer, public servant and politician

Arthur Legrand (28 October 1833 – 8 May 1916) was a French lawyer, public servant and politician who represented Manche in the legislature almost continuously from 1871 to his death in 1916. His political beliefs were Bonapartist and conservative at first, and later he ran as an independent.

== Early life ==
Arthur Marie Alexis Legrand was born on 28 October 1833 in Paris. His parents were Baptiste Victor Alexis Legrand^{(fr)} (1791–1848) and Marie Françoise Anasthasie de Roux (1807–1859). His father was deputy for Mortain, Manche, under the July Monarchy from 1832 to 1848.

== Career ==
Arthur Legrand qualified as a lawyer, and was accepted as an auditor at the Conseil d'État. He was attached to the public works section, which his father had presided over, and became secretary of many committees include those on the merchant marine, the sliding scale, the rural code, credit institutions and mining legislation.

Legrand married Thérèse Charlotte Gamot (1841-1899) on 10 November 1860 in Toulon. Their children were Elisabeth (1861-1946), Alexis (1862-1864) and Emmanuel Marie Arthur (1873-1954).

In 1862 he led a mission to England on the occasion of the 1862 International Exhibition, and on his return was decorated with the Legion of Honour. In 1865 and 1866 as attaché to the Superior Council of Commerce he contributed to the great inquiry into the circulation of cash and credit.

In 1866 Legrand was elected to the General Council of Manche for the canton of Barenton. He represented Barenton until 1907. Also in 1866 he was appointed maître des requêtes. He was mayor of Milly, Manche, from 1867 to 1916. After Léon Gambetta dissolved the departmental general councils on 26 December 1870 Legrand and Napoléon, comte Daru, protested the measure.

=== National Assembly ===
On 8 February 1871 Legrand was elected representative of Manche in the National Assembly. He was one of the ten original founders of the Appel au peuple parliamentary group. He was appointed to committees on railways, canals, markets, the Bank of France and the Sacré Cœur of Montmartre, for which he submitted a draft that became law. He submitted many legal proposals concerning primary education, the merchant navy, gendarmes, distillers and a Postal Savings Bank.

He voted for the repeal of the laws of exile, for the bishops' petition, against the three-year military service, for the resignation of Adolphe Thiers, for the decree against civil burials, for the seven-year presidential term, against the amendment proposed by Henri-Alexandre Wallon, against the constitutional laws and for the law on higher education. His term ended on 7 March 1876.

=== Chamber of Deputies ===
Legrand was elected to the Chamber of Deputies for the Mortain district of Manche of 20 February 1876 by 9,898 votes to 3,904 for his republican opponent. He resumed his place with the Bonapartist right, and supported the cabinet in the 16 May 1877 crisis. After the Chamber was dissolved he was reelected on 14 October 1877. He voted for the January 1878 proposal of Philippe Touchard^{(fr)} and for the republican ministries that followed. He was reelected on 21 August 1881.

He fought the education laws and the colonial and financial policies of the opportunistic ministries. He declined to run for election in 1885 because he could not agree with the other candidates on the list. His term ended on 14 October 1885.

Legrand was again elected deputy of Manche on 22 September 1889 and was reelected on 20 August 1893, 8 May 1898, 27 April 1902, 6 May 1906, 24 April 1910 and 26 April 1914. On each occasion he was returned to office by a large majority. From his various professions of belief he was clearly attached to freedom of education and the rights of the bouilleurs de cru (producers of eau de vie). He was concerned that France would lose the Christian religion, and was worried by the growing danger of socialism. He advocated election of the President of the Republic by universal suffrage. He was involved in many committees and participated in numerous debates.

== Death ==
Arthur Legrand died on 8 May 1916 in Paris. He was buried in Père Lachaise Cemetery. He was an Officer of the Académie française and a member of the Société d'Economie politique.

== Publications ==
Legrand contributed to the Revue Contemporaine, Economiste français and Revue Britannique. Various speeches, reports and propositions that he made as a deputy were published. Other publications included:

- Arthur Legrand (1856), (Ad municipalem (Dig. 50,1). Du domicile...) (Thèse pour la licence), Paris: C. de Mourgues, p. 36
- Arthur Legrand (January 1862), "De la Législation sur les brevets d'invention", Revue contemporaine, Paris: 36
- Arthur Legrand (1863), "Des Brevets d'invention", Exposition Universelle de 1862 (Rapports des membres de la section française du jury international), Paris: impr. de Chaix: 599–617
- Arthur Legrand (1871), De la Législation relative au prêt à intérêt, Mortain: impr. de H. Boulay, p. 64
- Arthur Legrand (1872), Dépositions orales faites devant le Conseil supérieur de l'agriculture et de l'industrie, dans l'enquête sur la circulation monétaire et fiduciaire, Paris: Impr. nationale, p. 422
- Arthur Legrand (1872), Résumé de l'enquête sur la circulation fiduciaire et monétaire
- Arthur Legrand (1874), L'École primaire et la Caisse d'épargne, lettre adressée à un maire de l'arrondissement de Mortain, Paris: Guillaumin, p. 36
- Arthur Legrand (July 1877), "L'Impôt sur le papier", Journal des économistes, Paris: Guillaumin: 15
- Arthur Legrand (September–October 1879), "Le billet de banque fiduciaire : sa fabrication, son mode d'émission, son rôle, sa suppression", Revue de France, Paris: 61
- Arthur Legrand (1881), Études économiques : Les Brevets d'invention; le prêt à intérêt : la caisse d'épargne postale, Paris: Guillaumin, p. 429
- Arthur Legrand (November 1882), "La Dette flottante et les fonds des caisses d'épargne", L'Économiste français, Paris: impr. de Chaix: 23
- Arthur Legrand (June 1883), "L'Industrie chevaline", Revue britannique, Paris: 27
- Arthur Legrand (November 1884), "L'Impôt foncier sur les propriétés non bâties", Revue britannique, Paris: 44
- Arthur Legrand (1884), Les Bouilleurs de cru
- Arthur Legrand (April 1886), "Le Crédit agricole", Revue britannique, Paris: 36
- Arthur Legrand (August 1885), "L'Imprimerie nationale", Revue britannique, Paris: 20
- Arthur Legrand (September 1898), "La Réforme de l'impôt sur les boissons", Revue britannique, Paris
- Arthur Legrand (1900), L'Assurance mutuelle contre la mortalité du bétail, lettre adressée à MM. les conseillers municipaux de l'arrondissement de Mortain, Mortain: A. Leroy, p. 31
- Arthur Legrand (1914), Les Bouilleurs de cru, leur défense, Mortain: Impr. de A. Leroy, p. 96

== Sources ==
- Arthur Legrand (1833-1916) - Auteur du texte (in French), BnF: Bibliotheque nationale de France
- Arthur, Marie, Alexis Legrand (in French), Assemblée nationale
- Chaline, Jean-Pierre; Corbin, Alain (2003), Les parlementaires de la troisième république... (in French), Publications de la Sorbonne, ISBN 978-2-85944-484-6
- Jolly, Jean (1960–1977), "LEGRAND, ARTHUR, MARIE, ALEXIS", Dictionnaire des parlementaires français de 1889 à 1940 (in French), Paris: Éditeur : Presses universitaires de France, ISBN 2-1100-1998-0
- LEGRAND Arthur (1833-1916) (in French), Amis et Passionnés du Père-Lachaise, archived from the original on 2018-01-27
- Pierfit, "Arthur Marie Alexis LEGRAND", Geneanet (in French)
- Robert, Adolphe; Cougny, Gaston (1889–1891), "LEGRAND (ARTHUR-MARIE-ALEXIS)", in Edgar Bourloton (ed.), Dictionnaire des Parlementaires français (1789–1889) (in French)
