= Hilaire de Barenton =

French friar and linguist (1864–1946)

- Born: Étienne Boulé; 28 February 1864; Barenton
- Died: 24 February 1946 (aged 81); Paris
- Occupations: Friar & Linguist
- Organization: Order of Friars Minor Capuchin
- Known for: Linguistics

Hilaire de Barenton, born Étienne Boulé (28 February 1864 in Barenton – 24 February 1946 in Paris), was a friar, linguist and historian of Middle Eastern languages.

His name is often misspelled as Baranton.

== Life ==
Ordained a Catholic priest in 1887, he joined the Capuchins, under the name of Father Hilaire, on 2 August 1889 and lectured in Turkey.

Back in France, he taught science, philosophy and dogmatic theology. Soon, he acquired a reputation as a linguist, and he participated in 1936 in the Third International Congress of Linguistics.

== Works ==
- La langue étrusque, dialecte de l'ancien égyptien, Paris 1920
- L'origine des grammaires, leur source dans le sumérien et l'égyptien, Paris 1925
- L'origine des langues, des religions et des peuples

== Legacy ==
His theories enjoyed a certain celebrity in their time but have since been criticised. Albeit intriguing to the ear, they are no longer considered worthy of deeper scholarly scrutiny in most of contemporary linguistic research centres and communities. They were popular among Turkish nationalists under Atatürk in the 1930s: the Sun Language Theory (Güneş Dil Teorisi), based on L'origine des langues, des religions et des peuples, claimed that all languages were derived from a common Central Asian root, a paleontological "proto-language" that can be established only hypothetically. Not only the Turkic languages, spoken in Central Asia and Turkey today, but also the Maya (in Mesoamerica) and the extinct Sumerian (as seen on tablets excavated in Mesopotamia, in the Middle East) would be related.

== See also ==
- Adamic language
- Evolutionary linguistics
- History of linguistics
- Origin of language
- Proto-language
