= Étienne Vacherot =

French philosopher (1809–1897)

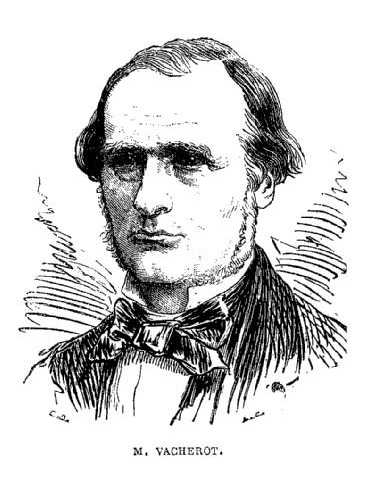
- Born: 29 July 1809; Torcenay, France
- Died: 28 July 1897 (aged 87); Paris, France
- Occupations: Philosopher, professor, politician

Education
- Education: École préparatoire

Philosophical work
- Notable works: Histoire critique de l'école d'Alexandrie (1846–1851)

Étienne Vacherot (French pronunciation: [etjɛn vaʃ(ə)ʁo]; 29 July 1809 – 28 July 1897) was a French philosophical writer and politician.

== Life ==
Vacherot was born of peasant parentage at Torcenay, near Langres in the Haute-Marne department of France.

He was educated at the École préparatoire, and returned there as director of studies in 1838, after some years spent in provincial schoolmasterships. In 1839 he succeeded his master Victor Cousin as professor of philosophy at the Sorbonne. His Histoire critique de l'école d'Alexandrie (3 vols. 1846–51), was his first and best-known work. It drew on him attacks from the Clerical party which led to his suspension in 1851. Shortly afterwards he refused to swear allegiance to the new imperial government, and was dismissed from his post. His work La Démocratie (1859) led to a political prosecution and imprisonment.

On 7 March 1868 he was elected to the Académie des sciences morales et politiques. Upon the fall of the Empire, he took an active part in politics, was mayor of a district of Paris during the siege, and in 1871 was in the National Assembly, voting as a Moderate Liberal. In 1873 he drew nearer the Conservatives, after which he was never again successful as a parliamentary candidate, though he maintained his principles vigorously in the press.

While a noted freethinker in the 1850s and 1860s, later in life Vacherot felt remorse over the growth of atheistic anticlericalism and returned to both Catholicism and monarchism, receiving Catholic burial upon his death.

The Vacherot brothers, André and Marcel, both French tennis champions, were grandsons of Étienne Vacherot.

== Philosophy ==
Vacherot was a man of high character and adhered strictly to his principles, which were generally opposed to those of the party in power. His chief philosophical importance consists in the fact that he was a leader in the attempt to revivify French philosophy by the new thought of Germany, to which he had been introduced by Victor Cousin, but of which he never had more than a second-hand knowledge. Metaphysics he held to be based on psychology. He maintains the unity and freedom of the soul, and the absolute obligation of the moral law. In religion, which was his main interest, he was much influenced by Hegel, and appears somewhat in the ambiguous position of a sceptic anxious to believe. He sees insoluble contradictions in every mode of conceiving God as real, yet he advocates religious belief, though the object of that belief have but an abstract or imaginary existence.

== Works ==
Besides the two works mentioned above, he wrote:

- La Métaphysique et la science (1858)
- Essais de philosophie critique (1864)
- La Religion (1869)
- La Science et la conscience (1870)
- Le Nouveau Spiritualisme (1884)
- La Démocratie libérale (1892)
