= Torcenay =

- Commune
- Location of Torcenay
- Location within France Location within Grand Est
- Coordinates: 47°48′56″N 5°27′56″E
- Country: France
- Region: Grand Est
- Department: Haute-Marne
- Arrondissement: Langres
- Canton: Chalindrey

Government
  - Mayor (2020–2026): Olivier Domaine
- Area^{1}: 8.49 km^{2} (3.28 sq mi)
- Elevation: 326 m (1,070 ft)
- Highest elevation: 409 m (1,342 ft)
- Lowest elevation: 279 m (915 ft)
- Population (2023): 546
  - Density: 64.3/km^{2} (167/sq mi)
- Time zone: UTC+01:00 (CET)
  - Summer (DST): UTC+02:00 (CEST)
- INSEE/Postal code: 52492 /52600
- ^{1} French Land Register data, which excludes lakes, ponds, glaciers > 1 km^{2} (0.386 sq mi or 247 acres) and river estuaries.

Torcenay (French pronunciation: [tɔʁsənɛ]) is a commune in the Haute-Marne department in north-eastern France.

== See also ==
- Communes of the Haute-Marne department
