= Eugène Chevandier de Valdrôme =

19th century French politician and industrialist

Eugène Chevandier de Valdrome
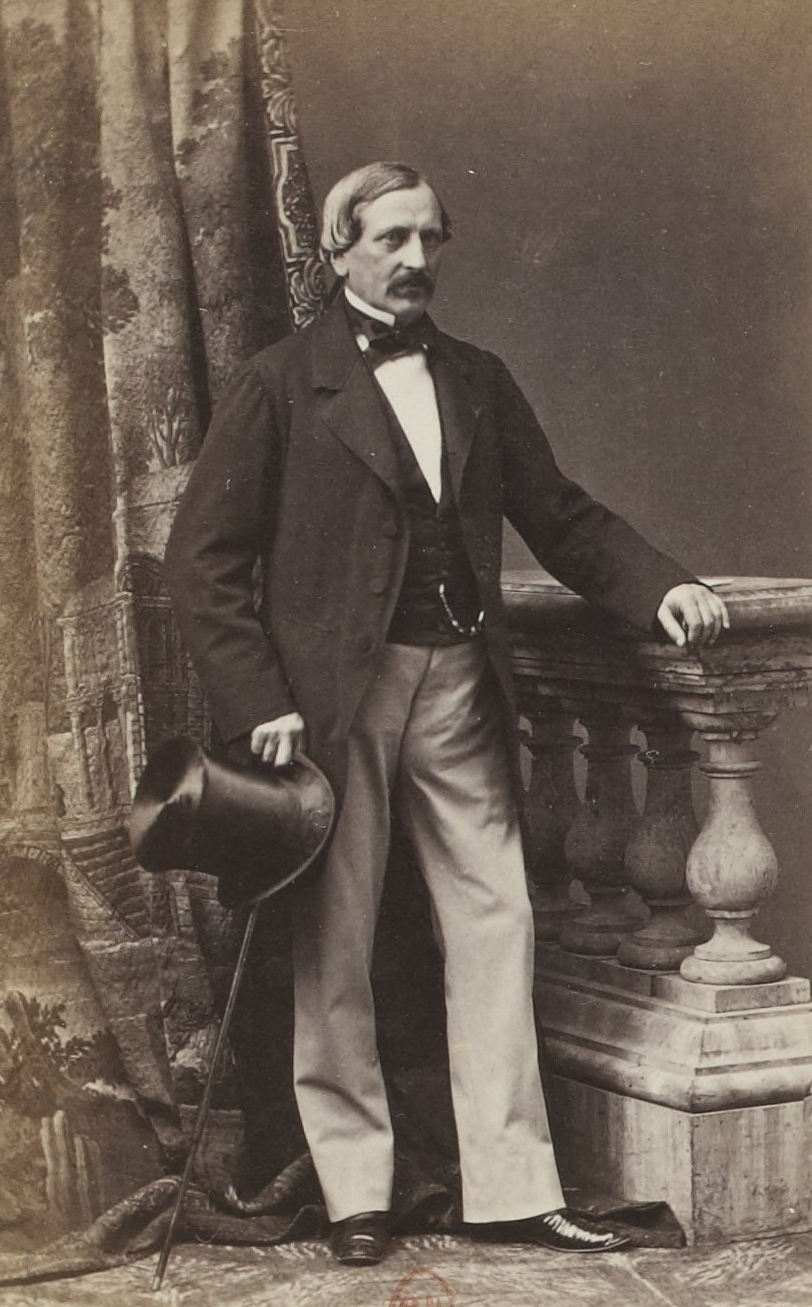

Minister of the Interior
- In office 1870–1870

Jean-Pierre Napoléon Eugène Chevandier de Valdrome (17 August 1810 – 1 December 1878) was a French politician and industrialist. He was Minister of the Interior from January to August 1870 in the government of Émile Ollivier.
