= Auguste de Talhouët-Roy =

French politician

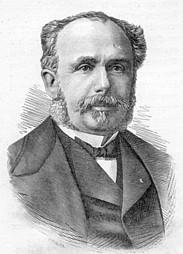

Auguste Élisabeth Joseph Bon-Amour de Talhouët-Roy, marquis de Talhouët (11 October 1819, in Paris – 11 May 1884, in château du Lude, Sarthe) was a French politician. He was deputy for Sarthe from 1849 to 1876 and senator for Sarthe from 1876 to 1882. He also served as minister for public works in Émile Ollivier's cabinet from 2 January to 15 May 1870.

== Sources ==
- Auguste, Elisabeth, Joseph Bonamour de Talhouët-Roy - Base de données des députés français depuis 1789 - Assemblée nationale
