= Jean-Baptiste Duvergier =

French lawyer and expert on jurisprudence

Jean-Baptiste-Marie Duvergier
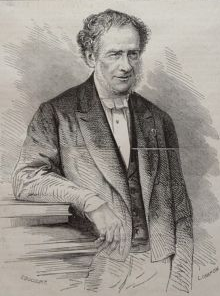
- Portrait from Le Monde Illustré of 24 July 1869
- Born: 25 August 1792; Bordeaux, France
- Died: 2 November 1877 (aged 85); Bordeaux, France
- Occupation: Lawyer
- Known for: Minister of Justice and Cults

Jean-Baptiste-Marie Duvergier (25 August 1792 – 2 November 1877) was a French lawyer and expert on jurisprudence who was known for his work in collecting and publishing laws and ordinances. He served as Minister of Justice and Cults in the government of Louis-Napoléon Bonaparte from 17 July 1869 to 2 January 1870.

== Early years ==
Jean-Baptiste-Marie Duvergier was born in Bordeaux on 25 August 1792. His father was a middle-class merchant. He studied law in Bordeaux, then moved to Paris where he completed his studies and founded his law firm. Duvergier became an advocate in Paris in 1821.

As a young man he was one of the first followers of Saint-Simon. He was one of the founders of the journal Le Producteur, and with Olinde Rodrigues belonged to the first circle of friends of Saint Simon. He was also interested in the utilitarianism of Saint-Simon's disciple Jeremy Bentham. He wrote, "it is to Bentham's credit that he abandoned a false path and showed the right path by demonstrating the purpose of legislation by saying that its aim was for General Utility." Later he broke with the movement due to his religious beliefs.

== Career ==
Duvergier married Jeanne-Josèphine-Perette Arnheiter (1804 – 19 March 1854). He soon became well known for his legal expertise and attracted a clientele of wealthy businessmen and political leaders. Duvergier was president of the bar of Paris from 1844 to 1845, and was appointed Councillor of State in 1855. He presided over a section of the Council of State in 1866.

Duvergier was appointed Minister of Justice and Religious Affairs on 17 July 1869, replacing Jules Baroche. The cabinet he joined had the mission of preparing the parliamentary empire for a revised constitution, which he assisted in drafting. At the end of his term of office, on 2 January 1870 he was nominated as a senator of the Second French Empire. He was replaced by Émile Ollivier.

Duvergier died in Bordeaux on 2 November 1877. The Rue Duvergier in Paris (48.889365°N 2.376931°E) is named in his honor.

== Works ==
Jean-Baptiste Duvergier is best known for starting the Collection complète des lois, décrets, ordonnances, réglements, avis du Conseil-d’État published by A. Guyot et Scribe. The first volume appeared in 1824, and new volumes continued to be published by the company long after Duvergier had died.

Duvergier also co-authored a Collection des constitutions, chartes et lois fondamentales des peuples de l’Europe et des deux Amériques avec des précis offrant l’histoire des libertés et des institutions politiques chez les nations modernes (1823).

He published his views on the relationship between workers and employers in an article titled Des caractères distinctifs du louage d'ouvrage et du mandat salarié in the Revue de Législation et de Jurisprudence (April–September 1837).
