= Napoléon, comte Daru =

French politician and soldier

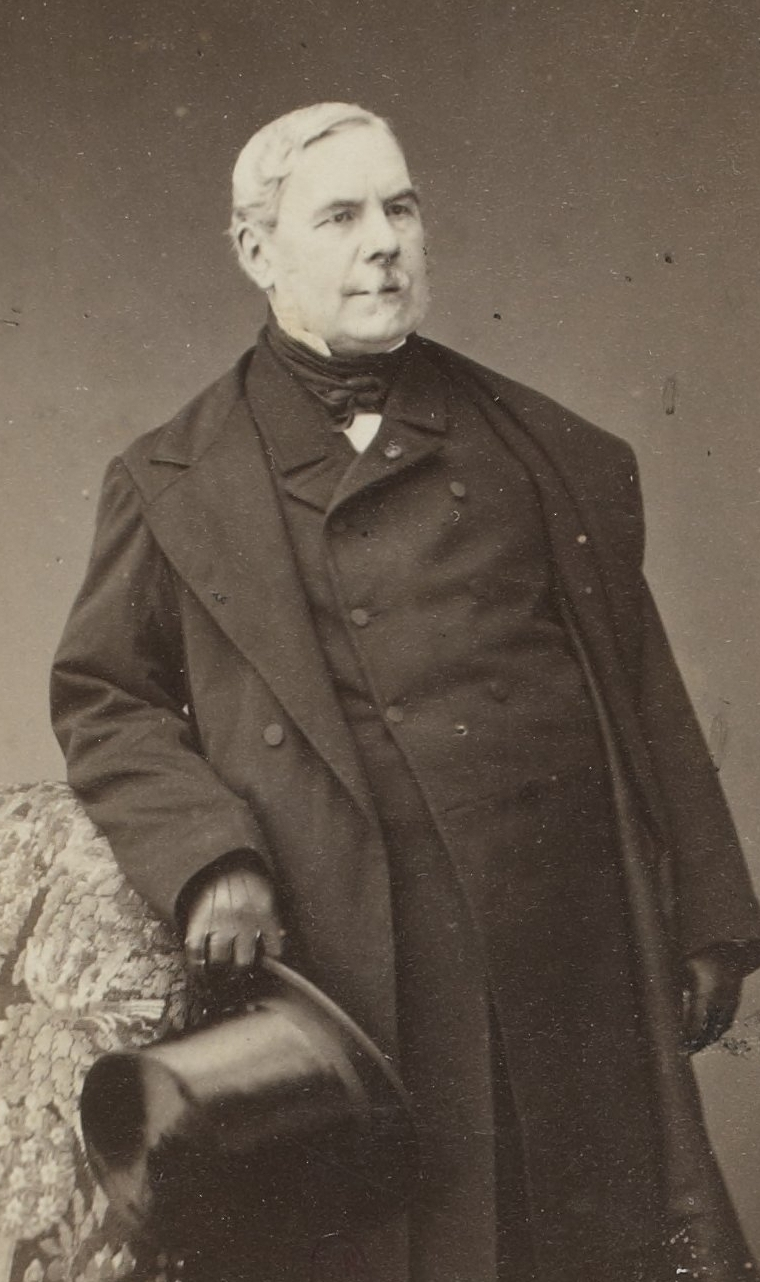
- Daru in the 1860s

Minister of Foreign Affairs
- In office 2 January 1870 – 13 April 1870
- Monarch: Napoleon III
- Prime Minister: Émile Ollivier
- Preceded by: Henri, Prince de La Tour d'Auvergne-Lauraguais
- Succeeded by: Émile Ollivier

Personal details
- Born: 11 June 1807 Paris, France
- Died: 20 February 1890 (aged 82) Paris, France

Napoléon, comte Daru (11 June 1807 – 20 February 1890), was a French soldier and politician.

== Career ==
Napoléon Daru was born on 11 June 1807 in Paris. He was the son of Pierre Daru and godson of Napoleon and Joséphine. He studied at the Lycée Louis-le-Grand, then at the École polytechnique and at the École militaire d'application in Metz. After becoming second-lieutenant of artillery in 1830, he participated with military honor in the French conquest of Algeria. He became peer of France in 1833.

During the French Second Republic he was a member of the National Constituent Assembly for Manche from 7 January 1849 to 26 May 1849, and a member of the National Legislative Assembly for Manche from 13 May 1849 to 8 December 1851. During the Second French Empire he was a member of the Corps législatif for Manche from 6 June 1869 to 4 September 1870. He was a member of the Académie des Sciences Morales et Politiques in 1860, and Minister of Foreign Affairs in the cabinet of Émile Ollivier in 1870.

After Léon Gambetta dissolved the departmental general councils on 26 December 1870, Daru and Arthur Legrand protested the measure. During the French Third Republic Daru was a member of the National Assembly for Manche from 8 February 1871 to 7 March 1876. He belonged to the Orléanist parliamentary group, Centre droit. He was a member of the Senate from 30 January 1876 to 4 January 1879. Napoléon Daru died on 20 February 1890 in Paris.

== Sources ==
- Napoléon Daru (in French), Assemblée nationale
- Robert, Adolphe; Cougny, Gaston (1889–1891), "LEGRAND (ARTHUR-MARIE-ALEXIS)", in Edgar Bourloton (ed.), Dictionnaire des Parlementaires français (1789–1889) (in French)
