= Ernest Eugène Appert =

French photographer

Ernest Eugène Appert (1830–1891) was a French photographer known for having produced a series of faked photos, titled Crimes de la Commune, meant to discredit the communards protesting in the Paris communes of 1871. His work is included in the collections of the National Gallery of Canada, the Getty Museum, the Musée d'Orsay, the National Portrait Gallery, London, the Victoria and Albert Museum and the Metropolitan Museum of Art.

Appert was born in Angers in the Pays de la Loire in 1830 and died in 1891 in Cannes, France.
