= Edmond Le Bœuf =

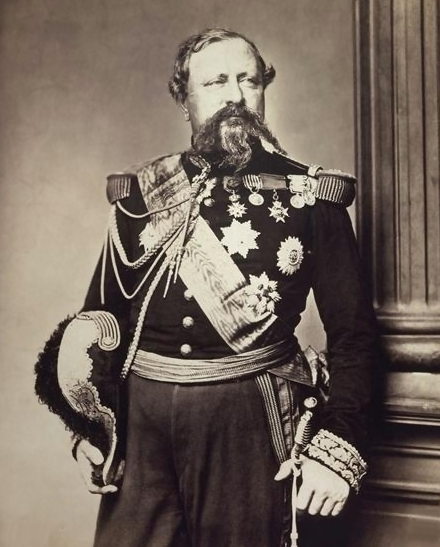
- Edmond Le Bœuf
- Born: 5 December 1809; Paris, France
- Died: 7 June 1888 (aged 78); Château du Moncel, France
- Burial place: chapelle du château de Moncel
- Military career
- Allegiance: Kingdom of France; French Second Republic; Second French Empire
- Branch: French Army
- Service years: 1831–1870
- Rank: Maréchal de France
- Conflicts: Conquest of Algeria; Crimean War; Franco-Austrian War; Franco-Prussian War
- Awards: Legion of Honour (Grand Croix)

Edmond Leboeuf (French: [ɛdmɔ̃ lə bœf]; 5 December 1809 – 7 June 1888) was a marshal of France. He joined the French army as an artillery officer. He fought in Algeria, the Crimean War (1853–1856) and the Italian War of 1859. In 1869 he became minister of war and in the spring of the next year was promoted to Marshal of France. He fought in the Franco-Prussian War (1870) being taken prisoner when Metz garrison surrendered to the Prussians. On his return to France, after the end of hostilities, he gave evidence to a commission into the surrender of Metz, and then retired into private life.

== Biography ==
Leboeuf was born at Paris, passed through the École polytechnique and the school of Metz, and distinguished himself as an artillery officer in Algerian warfare, becoming colonel in 1852. He commanded the artillery of the 1st French corps at the siege of Sebastopol, and was promoted in 1854 to the rank of general of brigade, and in 1857 to that of general of division.

In the Italian War of 1859 he commanded the artillery, and by his action at the battle of Solferino materially assisted in achieving the victory. In September 1866, having in the meantime become aide-de-camp to Napoleon III, he was dispatched to Venetia to hand over that province to Victor Emmanuel. In 1869, on the death of Marshal Niel, General Leboeuf became minister of war, and earned public approbation by his vigorous reorganization of the War Office and the civil departments of the service. In the spring of 1870 he received the marshal's baton.

On the declaration of war with Prussia, Marshal Leboeuf delivered himself in the Corps Législatif of the historic saying, "So ready are we, that if the war lasts two years, not a gaiter button would be found wanting". It may be that he intended this to mean that, given time, the reorganization of the War Office would be perfected through experience, but the result inevitably caused it to be regarded as a mere boast, though it is now known that the administrative confusion on the frontier in July 1870 was far less serious than was supposed at the time. Leboeuf took part in the Lorraine campaign, at first as chief of staff (major-general) of the Army of the Rhin (1870), and afterwards, when Bazaine became commander-in-chief, as chief of the III Corps, which he led in the battles around Metz. He distinguished himself, whenever engaged, by personal bravery and good leadership. Shut up with Bazaine in Metz, on its fall he was confined as a prisoner in Prussia.

On the conclusion of peace he returned to France and gave evidence before the commission of inquiry into the surrender of that stronghold, when he strongly denounced Bazaine. After this he retired into private life to the Chateau du Moncel near Argentan, where he died in 1888.

Political offices
Preceded by Charles Rigault de Genouilly	Minister of War; 21 August 1869 – 20 July 1870	Succeeded by Pierre Charles Dejean
