= Émile Ollivier =

French statesman (1825–1913)

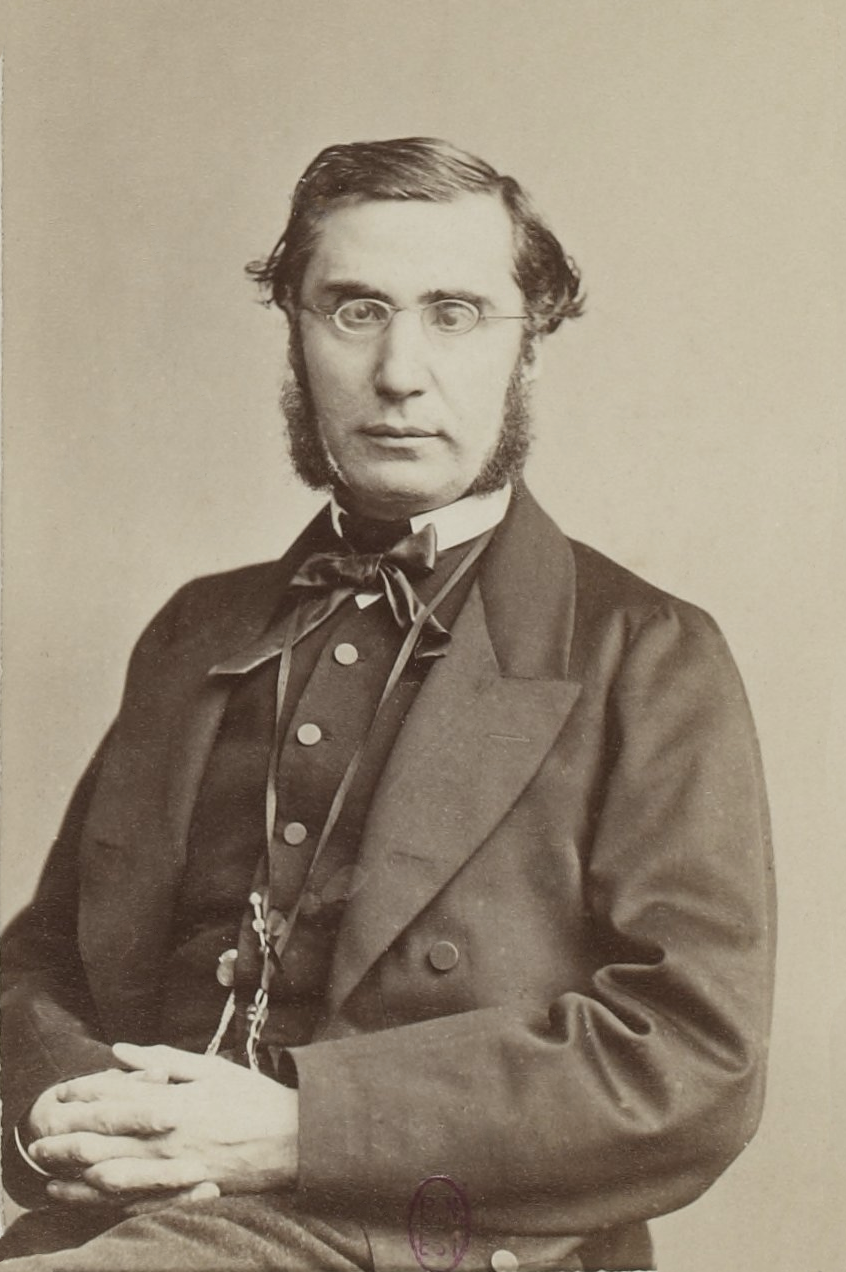
- Ollivier in 1870

Prime Minister of France
- In office 27 December 1869 – 9 August 1870
- Monarch: Napoleon III
- Preceded by: Personal rule of Napoleon III between 1852 and 1869. Previous Prime Minister: Léon Faucher (1852)
- Succeeded by: Charles Cousin-Montauban, Comte de Palikao

Personal details
- Born: Olivier Émile Ollivier; 2 July 1825 Marseille, Kingdom of France
- Died: 20 August 1913 (aged 88) Saint-Gervais-les-Bains, France
- Party: Moderate Republicans (1857-1867); Third Party (1867-1870)
- Spouses: Blandine Liszt (m. 1857; died 1862) Marie-Thérèse Gravier (m. 1869)
- Children: 4

Olivier Émile Ollivier (French: [emil ɔlivje]; 2 July 1825 – 20 August 1913) was a French statesman. Starting as an avid republican opposed to Emperor Napoleon III, he pushed the Emperor toward liberal reforms and in turn came increasingly into Napoleon's grip. He entered the cabinet and was the prime minister when Napoleon fell.

== Biography ==
Émile Ollivier was born on 2 July 1825 in Marseille. His father, Démosthène Ollivier (1799–1884), was a vehement opponent of the July Monarchy, and was returned by Marseille to the Constituent Assembly in 1848 which established a republic. The father's opposition to Louis Napoleon led to his banishment after the coup d'état of December 1851, and he returned to France only in 1860.

With the establishment of the Second Republic, his father's influence with Ledru-Rollin secured for Émile Ollivier the position of commissary-general of the département of Bouches-du-Rhône. Ollivier, then twenty-three, had just been called to the Parisian bar. Less radical in his political opinions than his father, he suppressed a socialist uprising at Marseille, commending himself to General Cavaignac, who made him prefect of the département. He was shortly afterwards removed to the comparatively unimportant prefecture of Chaumont-la-Ville (Haute-Marne), a demotion perhaps brought about by his father's enemies. He resigned from the civil service to take up a practice at the bar, where his abilities assured his success.

== Calls for a Liberal Empire ==
He re-entered political life in 1857 as deputy for the 3rd circumscription of the Seine département. His candidacy had been supported by the Siècle, and he joined the constitutional opposition. With Alfred Darimon, Jules Favre, JL Hénon and Ernest Picard he formed a group known as Les Cinq (the Five), which wrung from Napoleon III some concessions in the direction of constitutional government.

Although still a republican, Ollivier was a moderate who was prepared to accept the Empire in return for civil liberties even if it was a step-by-step process.

The imperial decree of 24 November, permitting the insertion of parliamentary reports in the Moniteur, and an address from the Corps Législatif in reply to the speech from the throne, were welcomed by him as an initial piece of reform. This marked a considerable change of attitude, for only a year previously he attacked the imperial government, in the course of a defence of Étienne Vacherot, brought to trial for the publication of La Démocratie. This resulted in his suspension from the bar for three months.

He gradually separated from his old associates, who grouped themselves around Jules Favre, and during the session of 1866–1867, Ollivier formed a third party, which supported the principle of a Liberal Empire.

On the last day of December 1866, Count AFJ Walewski, continuing negotiations begun by the duc de Morny, offered to make Ollivier the Minister of Education, representing the general policy of the government in the Chamber. The imperial decree of 19 January 1867, together with the promise inserted in the Moniteur of a relaxation of the stringency of the press laws and of concessions in respect of the right of public meeting, failed to satisfy Ollivier's demands, and he refused the office.

== Politics ==
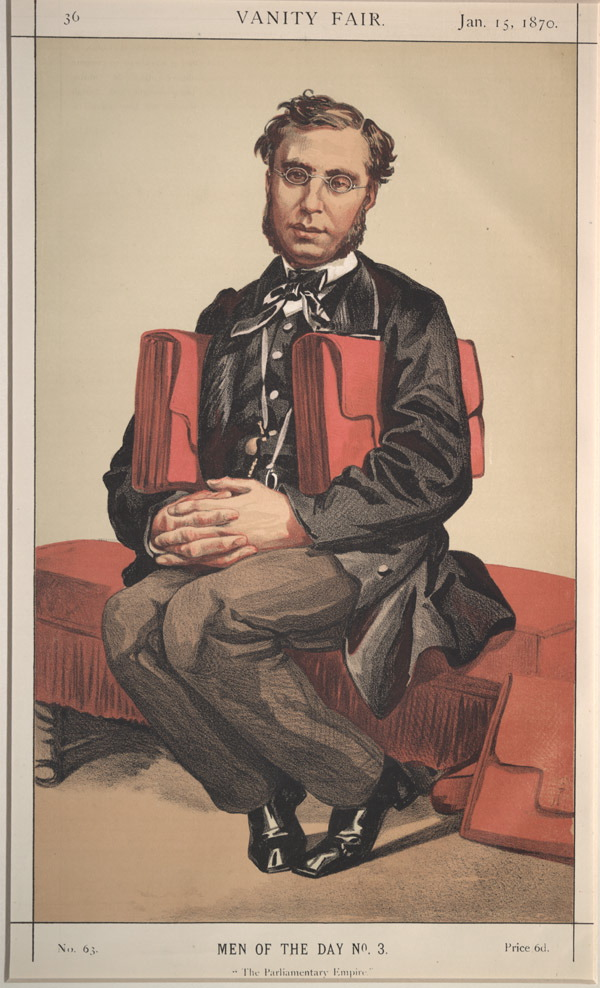
"The Parliamentary Empire". Caricature by Coïdé published in Vanity Fair in 1870.

On the eve of the general election of 1869, he published a manifesto, Le 19 janvier, on his policy. The sénatus-consulte of 8 September 1869 gave the two chambers ordinary parliamentary rights, and was followed by the dismissal of Eugène Rouher and the formation in the last week of that year of a ministry of which Ollivier was really premier, although that office was not nominally recognized by the constitution.

The new cabinet, known as the ministry of 2 January, had a hard task before it, complicated a week after its formation by the shooting of Victor Noir, a Republican journalist, by Pierre Napoleon Bonaparte, the Emperor's cousin. Ollivier immediately summoned the high court of justice for the judgment of Prince Bonaparte and Joachim Murat. The riots following the murder were suppressed without bloodshed; circulars were sent round to the prefects forbidding them to put pressure on the electors in favour of official candidates; Baron Haussmann was dismissed from the prefecture of the Seine département.

The violent press campaign against the emperor, to whom he had promised a happy old age, was broken by the prosecution of Henri Rochefort; and on 20 April a sénatus-consulte was issued which accomplished the transformation of the Empire into a constitutional monarchy. Neither concessions nor firmness sufficed to appease the "Irreconcilables" of the opposition, who since the relaxation of the press laws were able to influence the electorate.

On 8 May, however, the amended constitution was submitted, on Rouher's advice, to a plebiscite, which resulted in a vote of nearly seven to one in favour of the government. This appeared to confirm that Napoleon III's son, Louis-Napoléon, would succeed him and was a bitter blow to the Republicans.

The most distinguished members of the Left in the cabinet – LJ Buffet, Napoleon Daru and Auguste de Talhouët-Roy – resigned in April over the plebiscite. Ollivier himself held the ministry of foreign affairs for a month, until Daru was replaced by the duc de Gramont, a close aly of Ollivier. The other vacancies were filled by J.P. Mège and Charles Ignace Plichon, both of them of Conservative tendencies.

== Franco-Prussian War ==
The revival of the candidature of Prince Leopold of Hohenzollern-Sigmaringen for the Spanish throne early in 1870 disconcerted Ollivier's plans. The French government, following Gramont's advice, instructed their ambassador to Prussia, Benedetti, to demand from the Prussian king a formal disavowal of the Hohenzollern candidature. Ollivier allowed himself to be won over by the war party. It is unlikely that he could have prevented the eventual outbreak of war, maybe he might have postponed it if he had heard Benedetti's account of the incident. He was outmanoeuvered by Otto von Bismarck, and on 15 July he made a hasty declaration in the Chamber that the Prussian government had issued to the powers a note announcing the rebuff received by Benedetti, the Ems Dispatch. He obtained a war vote of 500,000,000 francs, and said that he accepted the responsibility of the war "with a light heart," saying that the war had been forced on France.

By 9 August, the French Army had lost three battles in three days (Battle of Wissembourg, of Spicheren and of Wörth), the Ollivier cabinet was driven from office, and Ollivier sought refuge from the general rage in Italy. He returned to France in 1873, but although he carried on an active campaign in the Bonapartist Estafette his political power was gone, and even in his own party he came into collision in 1880 with Paul de Cassagnac.

== Private life ==
He had many connections with the literary and artistic world, being one of the early Parisian champions of Richard Wagner. Elected to the academy in 1870, he did not take his seat. His first wife, Blandine Rachel Liszt, was the daughter of Franz Liszt and Marie d'Agoult. They had one son, Daniel. She died in 1862, and in September 1869 Ollivier married Marie-Thérèse Gravier, then 19 years old. They had three children. Ollivier died on 20 August 1913 in Saint-Gervais-les-Bains.

== Literary works ==
During his retirement he employed himself in writing a history of L'Empire libéral, the first volume of which appeared in 1895. The work really dealt with the remote and immediate causes of the war, and was the author's apology for his blunder. The 13th volume showed that the immediate blame could not justly be placed entirely on his shoulders. L'Empire libéral can be considered as an important document for the history of his time.

  - Vol. 1 (1895): Le principe des Nationalités (online)
  - Vol. 2 (1897): Louis-Napoléon et le coup d'état (online)
  - Vol. 3 (1898): Napoléon III (online)
  - Vol. 4 (1899): Napoléon III et Cavour (online)
  - Vol. 5 (1900): L'Inauguration de l'Empire libérale roi Guillaume (online)
  - Vol. 6: La Pologne; les élections de 1863, la loi des coalitions (online)
  - Vol. 7 (1903): Le démembrement du Danemark; Le syllabus; La mort de Morny; L'entrevue de Biarritz (online)
  - Vol. 8 (1903): L'Année fatale – Sadowa (1866) (online)
  - Vol. 9 (1904): Le Désarroi (online)
  - Vol. 10 (1905): L'Agonie de l'Empire autoritaire (online)
  - Vol. 11 (1907): La veillée des armes. L'affaire Baudin. Préparation militaire prussienne. Le plan de Moltke. Réorganisation de l'armée française par l'empereur et le maréchal Niel. Les élections en 1869. L'origine du complot Hohenzollern (online)
  - Vol. 12 (1908): Le ministère du 2 janvier. Formation du ministère. L'affaire Victor Noir. Suite du complot Hohenzollern. (online)
  - Vol. 13 (1909): Le guet-apens Hohenzollern. Le concile œcuménique. Le plébiscite (online)
  - Vol. 14 (1909): La guerre. Explosion du complot Hohenzollern. Déclaration du 6 juillet. Retrait de la candidature Hohenzollern. Demande de garantie. Soufflet de Bismarck. Notre réponse au soufflet de Bismarck. La déclaration de guerre (online)
  - Vol. 15 (1911): Étions-nous prêts? Préparation. Mobilisation. Sarrebruck. Alliances (online)
  - Vol. 16 (1912): Le suicide. Premier acte: Woerth. Forbach. Renversement du ministère (online)
  - Vol. 17 (1915): La fin (online)
  - Vol. 18 (1918): Table générale et analytique (online)
  - The Franco-Prussian War and its hidden causes (1913, online)

His other works include:

- Démocratie et liberté (1867, online)
- Le Ministère du 2 janvier, mes discours (1875)
- Principes et conduite (1875)
- L'Eglise et l'Etat au concile du Vatican (2 vols., 1879)
- Solutions politiques et sociales (1893)
- Nouveau Manuel du droit ecclésiastique français (1885).

Political offices
Preceded by —	Prime Minister of France; 1869–1870	Succeeded by Comte de Palikao
Preceded by Jean-Baptiste Duvergier	Minister of Justice; 1870	Succeeded by Michel Grandperret
Preceded by Jean-Baptiste Duvergier	Minister of Worship; 1870	Succeeded by Michel Grandperret
Preceded by Comte Daru	interim Minister of Foreign Affairs; 1870	Succeeded by Duc de Gramont
