= 1870 French constitutional referendum =

1870 constitutional referendum in France

A constitutional referendum was held in France on 8 May 1870. Voters were asked whether they approved of the liberal reforms made to the constitution since 1860 and passed by the Sénatus-consulte on 20 April 1870. The changes were approved by 83% of voters with an 81% turnout. However, France's defeat in the Franco-Prussian War caused the Empire to be abolished later that year. Although this was the ninth constitutional referendum in French history, it was the first to have more than 8% oppose the motion; four of the previous seven had officially gained 99% approval.

All French men over the age of 21 were entitled to vote in a commune in which they had resided for six months. Algerians and Kanaks had no right to vote. The vote was secret with the exception of those serving in the military. However, the authorities only printed yes ballots - voters had to supply their own ballots with no.

== Results ==
Choice	Votes	%
For	7,350,142	82.69
Against	1,538,825	17.31
Total	8,888,967	100.00
Valid votes	8,888,967	98.74
Invalid/blank votes	112,975	1.26
Total votes	9,001,942	100.00
Source: Nohlen & Stöver
