= Charles Cousin-Montauban, Comte de Palikao =

French general and statesman (1796–1878)

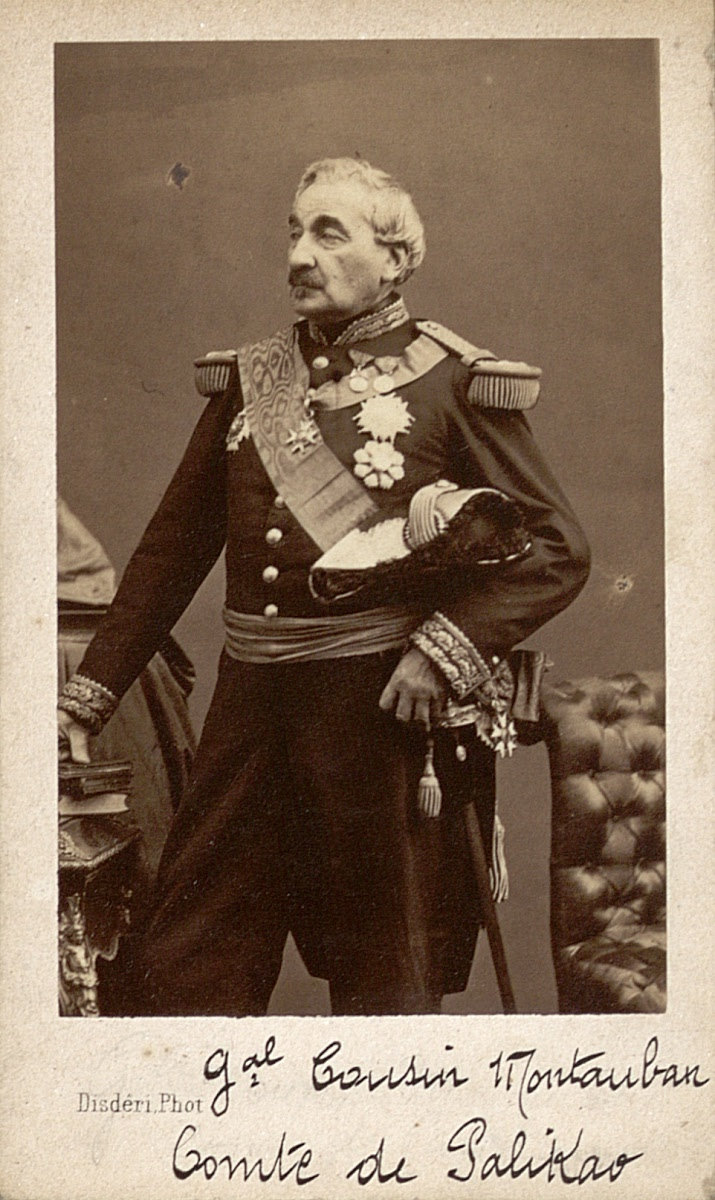

Prime Minister of France
- In office 9 August 1870 – 4 September 1870
- Monarch: Napoleon III
- Preceded by: Émile Ollivier
- Succeeded by: Louis Jules Trochu (as President of the Government of National Defense)

Personal details
- Born: 24 June 1796 Paris, French First Republic
- Died: 8 January 1878 (aged 81) Paris, French Third Republic
- Party: None
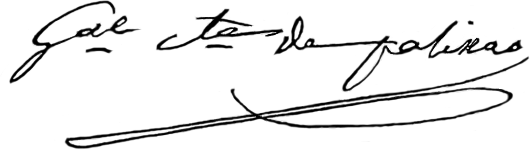
- Signature

Military service
- Allegiance: France
- Branch/service: French Army
- Years of service: 1817–1870
- Rank: General
- Battles/wars: French conquest of Algeria; Crimean War; Second Opium War; Franco-Prussian War

Charles Guillaume Marie Appollinaire Antoine Cousin-Montauban, 1er Comte de Palikao (French: [ʃaʁl kuzɛ̃ mɔ̃tobɑ̃ kɔ̃t də palika.o]; 24 June 1796 – 8 January 1878) was a French general and statesman.

== Biography ==
Montauban was born in Paris. As a cavalry officer he saw much service in Algeria, but he was still only a colonel when in 1847 he effected the capture of Abdel Kadir. Between January 1855 and November 1857, Montauban commanded the Division of Oran in western Algeria. In 1855 he was sent to fight in the Crimea. He was appointed in 1858 to a command at home, and at the close of 1859 was selected to lead the French troops in the Anglo-French expedition to China. His conduct of the operations did not escape criticism, but in 1862 he received from Napoleon III, the title of comte de Palikao (from the Battle of Palikao); he had already been made a senator. The allegation that he had acquired a vast fortune by the plunder of the Old Summer Palace in Peking seems to have been without foundation.

In 1865 he was appointed to the command of the IV army corps at Lyon, in the training of which he displayed exceptional energy and administrative capacity. In the Franco-Prussian War of 1870 he was not given a command in the field, but after the opening disasters had shaken the Ollivier ministry he was entrusted by the empress-regent with the portfolio of war, and became president of the council (10 August). He at once, with great success, reorganized the military resources of the nation. He claimed to have raised Marshal MacMahon's force at Châlons to 140,000 men, to have created three new army corps, 33 new regiments and 100,000 gardes mobiles, and to have brought the defences of the capital to a state of efficiency – all this in 24 days. He conceived the idea of sending the Army of Châlons to raise the blockade of Metz. The scheme depended on a precision and rapidity of which the Army of Châlons was no longer capable, and ended with the disaster of Sedan. After the capitulation of the emperor the dictatorship was offered to Palikao, but he refused to desert the empire, and proposed to establish a council of national defence, with himself as lieutenant-general of government. Before a decision was made, the chamber was invaded by the mob, and Palikao fled to Belgium.

In 1871 he appeared before the parliamentary commission of inquiry, and in the same year established Un Ministre de la guerre de vingt-quatre jours. He died at Versailles.

== See also ==
- Cousin-Montauban ministry

Political offices
Preceded by Émile Ollivier	Prime Minister of France; 9 August 1870 – 4 September 1870	Succeeded by Louis Jules Trochu
Preceded by Pierre Charles Dejean	Minister of War; 10 August 1870 – 4 September 1870	Succeeded by Adolphe Charles Le Flô
