= Third cabinet of Nicolas Jean-de-Dieu Soult =

French cabinet from 1840–1847

- Cabinet of France

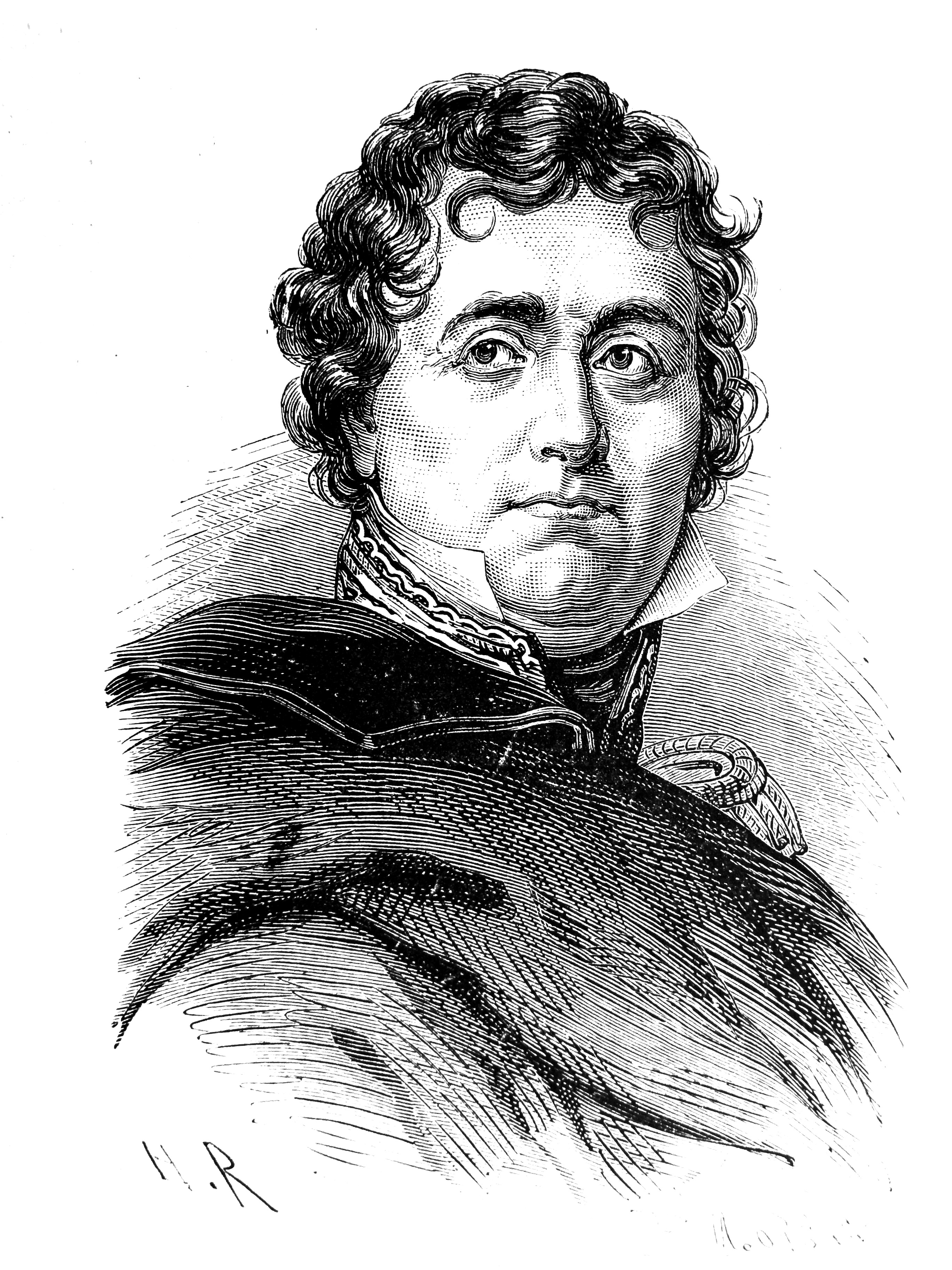
- Nicolas Jean-de-Dieu Soult
- Date formed: 29 October 1840
- Date dissolved: 19 September 1847

People and organisations
- Head of state: Louis Philippe I
- Head of government: Nicolas Jean-de-Dieu Soult

History
- Predecessor: Second cabinet of Adolphe Thiers
- Successor: Cabinet of François-Pierre Guizot

The Third cabinet of Nicolas Jean-de-Dieu Soult was announced on October 29, 1840 by King Louis Philippe I. It replaced the Second cabinet of Adolphe Thiers.

The ministry was replaced on September 19, 1847 by the Cabinet of François-Pierre Guizot.

== Ministers ==
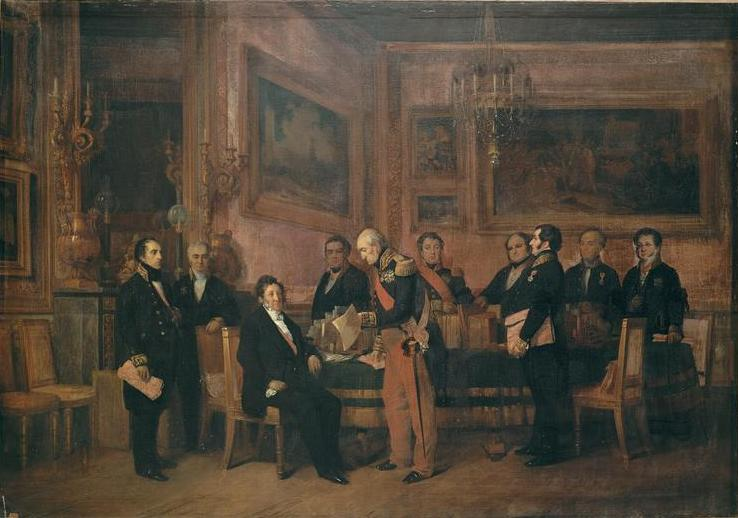
Council of Ministers on 15 August 1842. Soult presents the regency law to Louis-Philippe

The cabinet was created by ordinance of October 29, 1840. The ministers were:

Ministry	Start	End	Minister
President of the Council	29 October 1840	19 September 1847	Nicolas Soult
War	29 October 1840	10 November 1845	Nicolas Soult
War	10 November 1845	9 May 1847	Alexandre Moline de Saint-Yon
War	9 May 1847	19 September 1847	Camille Trézel
Interior	29 October 1840	19 September 1847	Tanneguy Duchâtel
Justice and Religious Affairs	29 October 1840	12 March 1847	Nicolas Martin du Nord
Justice and Religious Affairs	14 March 1847	19 September 1847	Michel Pierre Alexis Hébert
Foreign Affairs	29 October 1840	19 September 1847	François Guizot
Finance	29 October 1840	25 April 1842	Georges Humann
Finance	25 April 1842	9 May 1847	Jean Lacave-Laplagne
Finance	9 May 1847	19 September	Pierre Sylvain Dumon
Navy and Colonies	29 October 1840	7 February 1843	Guy-Victor Duperré
Navy and Colonies	7 February 1843	23 July 1843	Albin Roussin
Navy and Colonies	23 July 1943	9 May 1847	Ange de Mackau
Navy and Colonies	9 May 1847	19 September 1847	Louis Napoléon Lannes
Public Education	29 October 1840	30 December 1844	Abel-François Villemain
Public Education	1 February 1845	19 September 1847	Narcisse-Achille de Salvandy
Public Works	29 October 1840	16 December 1843	Jean-Baptiste Teste
Public Works	16 December 1843	9 May 1847	Pierre Sylvain Dumon
Public Works	9 May 1847	19 September 1847	Hippolyte Paul Jayr
Agriculture and Commerce	29 October 1840	19 September 1847	Laurent Cunin-Gridaine

Undersecretaries of state were:

- Interior: Antoine François Passy (from 4 November 1840)
- Navy and Colonies: Jean Jubelin (from 9 August 1844)
- War: François Martineau des Chenez (from 10 November 1845)

== Sources ==
- Muel, Léon (1891). Gouvernements, ministères et constitutions de la France depuis cent ans: Précis historique des révolutions, des crises ministérielles et gouvernementales, et des changements de constitutions de la France depuis 1789 jusqu'en 1890 ... Marchal et Billard.
