= Gasparin =

Gasparin is a surname. Notable people with the name include:

- Adrien de Gasparin (1783–1862), French statesman and agriculturist
- Agénor de Gasparin (1810–1871), French statesman and author
- Aita Gasparin (born 1994), Swiss biathlete
- Elisa Gasparin (born 1991), Swiss biathlete
- Selina Gasparin (born 1984), Swiss former biathlete
- Thomas-Augustin de Gasparin (1754–1793), French military officer
- Valérie de Gasparin (1813–1894), Swiss woman of letters

== See also ==
- Gasparin de Bergame (1360–1431), Italian grammarian and teacher
