= Cabinet of François-Pierre Guizot =

French cabinet from 1847–1848

- France; Cabinet of France
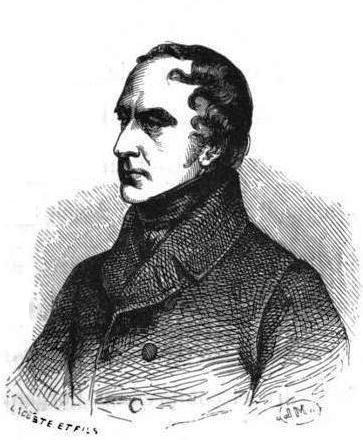
- François Guizot, President of the council
- Date formed: 19 September 1847
- Date dissolved: 24 February 1848

People and organisations
- Head of state: King Louis Philippe I
- Head of government: François Guizot

History
- Predecessor: Third cabinet of Nicolas Jean-de-Dieu Soult
- Successor: Provisional Government

The Cabinet of François-Pierre Guizot was the last ministry of King Louis Philippe I of France, formed by decree of 19 September 1847. It replaced the Third cabinet of Nicolas Jean-de-Dieu Soult. It was dissolved when the Provisional Government was formed on 24 February 1848 after the February Revolution.

== Ministers ==
The ministers were:

- President of the Council and Minister of Foreign Affairs: François Guizot
- Interior: Tanneguy Duchâtel
  - Sub-secretary of State for the Interior : Antoine François Passy
- Justice and Religious Affairs: Michel Hébert
- War: Camille Alphonse Trézel
  - Sub-secretary of State for War: Pierre Magne (as of 24 November 1847)
- Finance: Pierre Sylvain Dumon
- Navy and Colonies: Louis Napoléon Lannes, Duke of Montebello
  - Sub-secretary of State, Navy and Colonies: Jean Jubelin
- Public Education: Narcisse-Achille de Salvandy
- Public Works: Hippolyte Paul Jayr
- Agriculture and Commerce: Laurent Cunin-Gridaine

== Sources ==
- Muel, Léon (1891). Gouvernements, ministères et constitutions de la France depuis cent ans: Précis historique des révolutions, des crises ministérielles et gouvernementales, et des changements de constitutions de la France depuis 1789 jusqu'en 1890 ... Marchal et Billard.
