= Cabinet of Victor de Broglie =

French cabinet from 1835–1836

- Cabinet of France

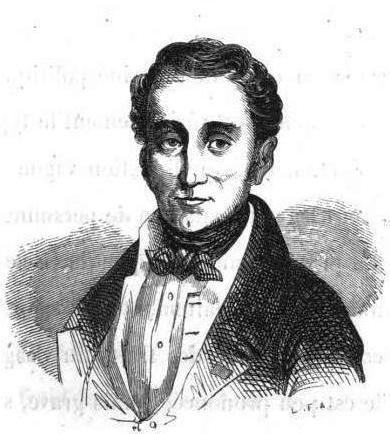
- Victor de Broglie
- Date formed: 12 March 1835
- Date dissolved: 22 February 1836

People and organisations
- Head of state: Louis Philippe I
- Head of government: Victor de Broglie

History
- Predecessor: Cabinet of Édouard Adolphe Mortier
- Successor: First cabinet of Adolphe Thiers

The Cabinet of Victor de Broglie was announced on 12 March 1835 by King Louis Philippe I. It replaced the Cabinet of Édouard Adolphe Mortier.

On 14 January 1836 the Minister of Finance, Georges Humann, presented the draft budget for 1837 to the Chamber of Deputies. This included a proposal for conversion of debt that had not been discussed with his cabinet colleagues. The proposal caused an unexpected storm of controversy, and Humann was forced to resign on 18 January 1836. The issue led to a public debate, followed by the collective resignation of the cabinet. The cabinet was replaced on 22 February 1836 by the First cabinet of Adolphe Thiers.

== Ministers ==
The cabinet was created by ordinance of 12 March 1835. The ministers were:

- President of the Council: Victor de Broglie
- Foreign Affairs: Victor de Broglie
- Interior: Adolphe Thiers; Sub-Secretary of State Adrien de Gasparin from 4 April 1835
- Justice: Jean-Charles Persil
- War:
  - Henri de Rigny (interim) until 30 April 1835
  - Nicolas Joseph Maison from 30 April 1835
- Finance
  - Georges Humann until 18 January 1836
  - Antoine Maurice Apollinaire d'Argout from 18 January 1836
- Navy and Colonies: Guy-Victor Duperré
- Public Education: François Guizot
- Commerce: Tanneguy Duchâtel

== Sources ==
- "Humann". IGPDE. 14 August 2007. Archived from the original on 25 March 2014.
- Muel, Léon (1891). Gouvernements, ministères et constitutions de la France depuis cent ans: Précis historique des révolutions, des crises ministérielles et gouvernementales, et des changements de constitutions de la France depuis 1789 jusqu'en 1890 ... Marchal et Billard.
