= Second cabinet of Nicolas Jean-de-Dieu Soult =

French cabinet from 1839–1840

- Cabinet of France

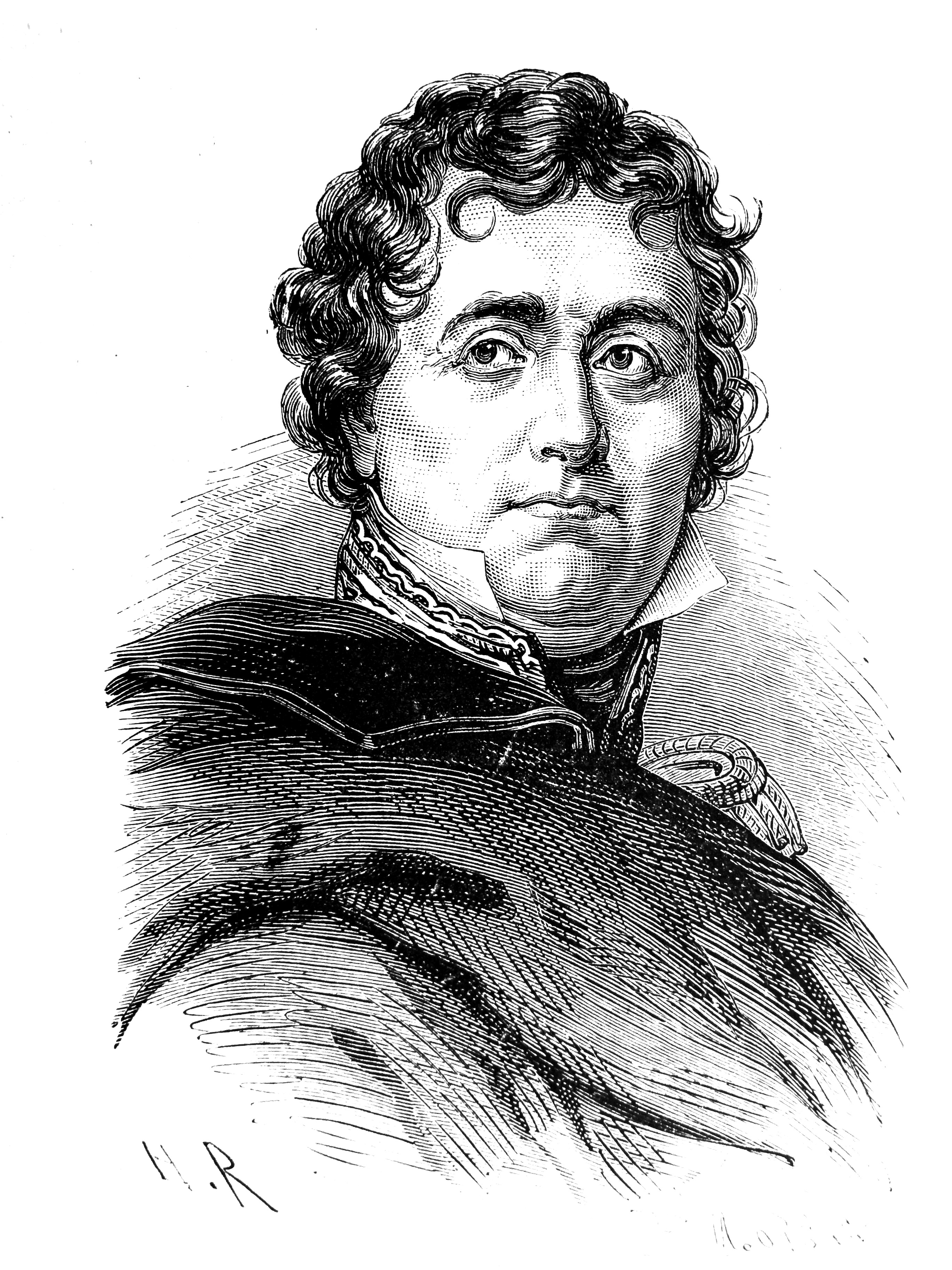
- Nicolas Jean-de-Dieu Soult
- Date formed: 12 May 1839
- Date dissolved: 1 March 1840

People and organisations
- Head of state: Louis Philippe I
- Head of government: Nicolas Jean-de-Dieu Soult

History
- Predecessor: Transitional French cabinet of 1839
- Successor: Second cabinet of Adolphe Thiers

The Second cabinet of Nicolas Jean-de-Dieu Soult was announced on 12 May 1839 by King Louis Philippe I. It replaced the Transitional French cabinet of 1839.

After a defeat in the Chamber of Deputies on 20 February 1840, the ministers gave their resignations to the king. The ministry was replaced on 1 March 1840 by the Second cabinet of Adolphe Thiers.

== Ministers ==
The cabinet was created by ordinance of 12 May 1839. The ministers were:

- President of the Council of Ministers: Nicolas Soult
- Foreign Affairs: Nicolas Soult
- Interior: Tanneguy Duchâtel
- Justice and Religious Affairs: Jean-Baptiste Teste
- War: Antoine Virgile Schneider
- Finance: Hippolyte Passy
- Navy and Colonies: Guy-Victor Duperré
- Public Education: Abel-François Villemain
- Public Works: Jules Armand Dufaure
- Agriculture and Commerce: Laurent Cunin-Gridaine

== Sources ==
- Muel, Léon (1891). Gouvernements, ministères et constitutions de la France depuis cent ans: Précis historique des révolutions, des crises ministérielles et gouvernementales, et des changements de constitutions de la France depuis 1789 jusqu'en 1890 ... Marchal et Billard.
