= Pézard =

Pézard is a French surname. Notable people with the surname include:

- Albert Pezard (1875–1927), French endocrinologist
- Maurice Pézard (1876–1923), French archaeologist and assyriologist
