= First cabinet of Louis Mathieu Molé =

French cabinet from 1835–1836

- Cabinet of France

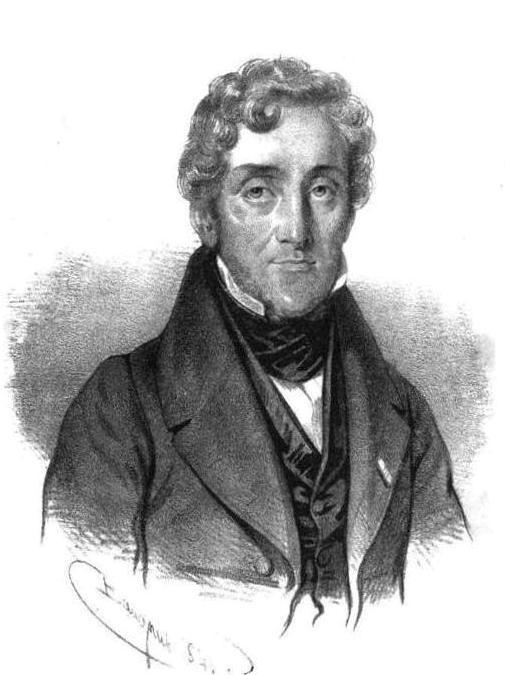
- Louis-Mathieu Molé
- Date formed: 6 September 1836
- Date dissolved: 15 April 1837

People and organisations
- Head of state: Louis Philippe I
- Head of government: Louis-Mathieu Molé

History
- Predecessor: First cabinet of Adolphe Thiers
- Successor: Second cabinet of Louis Mathieu Molé

The First cabinet of Louis Mathieu Molé was announced on 6 September 1836 by King Louis Philippe I. It replaced the First cabinet of Adolphe Thiers.

On 19 September 1836 the Ministry of Commerce was replaced by the Ministry of Public Works, Agriculture and Commerce. Following an insurrection on 30 October 1836 in Strasbourg, on 24 January 1837 the Minister of War, Bernard, introduced a draft law that would stop prosecution of crimes committed by the military and the civil authorities during the riots. Discussion began in the Chamber of Deputies on 28 February and continued until 7 March, when it was rejected by the deputies. This caused a ministerial crisis. The cabinet was dissolved on 15 April 1837, replaced by the Second cabinet of Louis Mathieu Molé.

== Ministers ==
The cabinet was created by ordinance of 6 September 1836. The ministers were:

- President of the Council: Louis-Mathieu Molé
- War: Simon, général-baron Bernard
- Justice: Jean-Charles Persil
- Foreign Affairs: Louis-Mathieu Molé
- Interior:
  - Adrien de Gasparin, Minister
  - Charles de Rémusat, Sub-secretary of State (from 8 September 1836)
- Finance: Tanneguy Duchâtel
- Navy and Colonies: Claude du Campe de Rosamel
- Public Education: François Guizot
- Commerce: Tanneguy Duchâtel (to 19 September 1836)
- Public Works, Agriculture and Commerce: Nicolas Martin du Nord (from 19 September 1836)

== Sources ==
- Muel, Léon (1891). Gouvernements, ministères et constitutions de la France depuis cent ans: Précis historique des révolutions, des crises ministérielles et gouvernementales, et des changements de constitutions de la France depuis 1789 jusqu'en 1890 ... Marchal et Billard.
