= Transitional French cabinet of 1839 =

French cabinet of 1839

- Cabinet of France
- Date formed: 31 March 1839
- Date dissolved: 12 May 1839

People and organisations
- Head of state: Louis Philippe I

History
- Predecessor: Second cabinet of Louis Mathieu Molé
- Successor: Second cabinet of Nicolas Jean-de-Dieu Soult

The Transitional French cabinet of 1839 was announced on 31 March 1839 by King Louis Philippe I. It replaced the Second cabinet of Louis Mathieu Molé.

On 12 May 1839 there was an insurrection in Paris, suppressed by the National Guard and regular troops. The ministry was replaced that day by the Second cabinet of Nicolas Jean-de-Dieu Soult.

== Ministers ==
The cabinet was created by ordinance of 31 March 1839. It did not include a president of the council of ministers. The ministers were:

- Interior: Adrien de Gasparin
- Foreign Affairs: Louis Napoléon Lannes, Duke of Montebello
- Justice and Religious Affairs: Amédée Girod de l'Ain
- War: Amédée Despans-Cubières
- Finance: Jean-Élie Gautier
- Navy and Colonies: Jean Tupinier
- Public Education: Narcisse Parant
- Public Works, Agriculture and Commerce: Adrien de Gasparin

== Sources ==
- Muel, Léon (1891). Gouvernements, ministères et constitutions de la France depuis cent ans: Précis historique des révolutions, des crises ministérielles et gouvernementales, et des changements de constitutions de la France depuis 1789 jusqu'en 1890 ... Marchal et Billard.
