= Jean Tupinier =

French naval engineer and politician

Jean Marguerite Tupinier
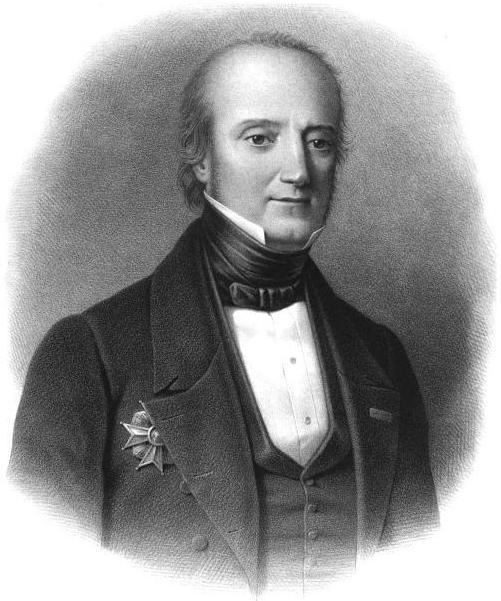
- Portrait from Panthéon des illustrations françaises au XIXe siècle, c.1865
- Born: 18 December 1779; Cuisery, Saône-et-Loire, France
- Died: 2 December 1850 (aged 70); Paris, France
- Occupations: Naval engineer, politician
- Known for: Minister of Navy and Colonies

Jean Marguerite Tupinier (18 December 1779 – 2 December 1850) was a French naval engineer and politician. In 1839 he was briefly Minister of Navy and Colonies.

== Early years ==
Jean Marguerite Tupinier was born in Cuisery, Saône-et-Loire, on 18 December 1779. His parents were the deputy Jean Tupinier and Claudine Royer. He was the oldest of their three sons. He entered the École Polytechnique on 13 December 1794 and graduated as a trainee naval engineer on 21 December 1796. He was employed in marine engineering in Brest, Toulon. He was the engineer of the naval squadron that undertook the Santo Domingo expedition of 1801–03.

For some time after his return Tupinier was attached to the port of Le Havre. He then became one of the engineers of the fleet assembled at Boulogne to invade England. When this army was broken up he went to Genoa in 1805, then to Venice in 1806. He remained in charge of the Lido dockyard until 1811. In 1813 he returned to Boulogne to monitor the sale or use of military material from the fleet. He was a deputy director at the Department of the Navy in 1814, and a division chief during the Hundred Days.

== Bourbon Restoration ==
Tupinier was disgraced at the second Bourbon Restoration and sent to Angoulême in the forestry department of the Navy. After eighteen months Laurent de Gouvion Saint-Cyr called him to work at the ministry as deputy director of ports in 1818, and director in 1823. He supervised major improvements to the ports of Toulon, Brest, Rochefort, Lorient and Cherbourg. He was part of the Commission de Paris of 1834 that designed the Suffren-class ship of the line.

In 1824 he was appointed Master of Requests at the Council of State. In 1828 he became a state councilor under the Martignac ministry. As Inspector General of Marine Engineering, he presided over organization of the fleet that carried the expeditionary army in the invasion of Algiers in 1830. He suggested the requirements for the Hercule-class ship of the line, launched in 1836–54 to fill the gap between the 90-gun Suffren-class battleship and the 120-gun three-decker ships of the Valmy design.

== July Monarchy ==
After the July Revolution of 1830 Tupinier was made acting Minister of the Navy, and at once gave the order to hoist the tricolor. He was made a commander of the Legion of Honor. On 2 January 1834 he was elected deputy for the 6th college of Finistère (Quimperlé). He was reelected on 21 June 1834. On 4 November 1837 he was elected deputy for the 6th college of Charente-Intérieure (Rochefort), and was reelected for this constituency on 2 March 1839.

After the resignation of the Second cabinet of Louis Mathieu Molé, on 31 March 1839 Tupinier was made Minister of the Navy in the Transitional French cabinet of 1839, holding office until 11 May 1839. After leaving office he was made a member of the Admiralty Board. He was reelected deputy on 22 June 1839 and 9 July 1842. He was named a counselor of state. He sat with the majority in the chamber. He was made a Peer of France on 14 August 1846 in recognition of his services.

== Last years ==
After the February Revolution of 1848 Tupinier returned to private life. He had been made a Knight of St. Louis in 1817, a member of the Order of St. Ferdinand of Spain in 1829 and a Grand Officer of the Legion of Honor on 30 April 1840. He died in Paris on 1 December 1850. He had no children.

== Publications ==
Selected publications:

- Tupinier, Jean-Marguerite (1822). Observations sur les dimensions des vaisseaux et des frégates dans la marine française, par M. Tupinier,... Impr. royale.
- Tupinier, Jean Marguerite (1830). Observations on the dimensions of the ships of the line and frigates in the French navy, tr. by a British officer.
- Tupinier, Jean-Marguerite (1838). Rapport sur le materiel de la marine par M. le baron Tupinier. Imprimerie Royale.
- Tupinier, Jean-Marguerite (1841). Considérations sur la marine et son budget, par M. le Bon Tupinier,... Impr. royale.
- Tupinier, Jean-Marguerite (1842). Examen des questions relatives au contrôle dans le département de la marine, par M. le Bon Tupinier,... Impr. royale.
- Tupinier, Jean-Marguerite (1994). Mémoires du Baron Tupinier: directeur des ports et arsenaux, 1779-1850. Les Editions Desjonqueres. ISBN 978-2-904227-81-3.

== Sources ==
- Lex, Léonce; Siraud, Pierre Marie (1888). Le Conseil général et les conseillers généraux de Saône-et-Loire, 1789-1889. Belhomme.
- Robert, Adolphe; Couchy, Gaston (1891). "TUPINIER (Jean Marguerite )". Dictionnaire des Parlementaires Français comprenant tous les membres des Assemblées Françaises et tous les Ministres Français depuis le 1er mai 1789 jusqu'au 1er mai 1889. Bourloton.
- Roberts, Stephen S (2011). "Hercule-class sail ship of the line (2nd class, 100 guns)" (PDF). shipscribe.com. Archived from the original (PDF) on 2012-02-16.
- Roche, Jean-Michel (2005). Dictionnaire des bâtiments de la flotte de guerre française de Colbert à nos jours, 1671–1870. Group Retozel-Maury Millau. ISBN 978-2-9525917-0-6. OCLC 165892922.
- Serre, Pierre François Hercule comte de (1876). Correspondance du comte de Serre (1796-1824). A. Vaton.
