= Second cabinet of Adolphe Thiers =

French cabinet of 1840

- Cabinet of France

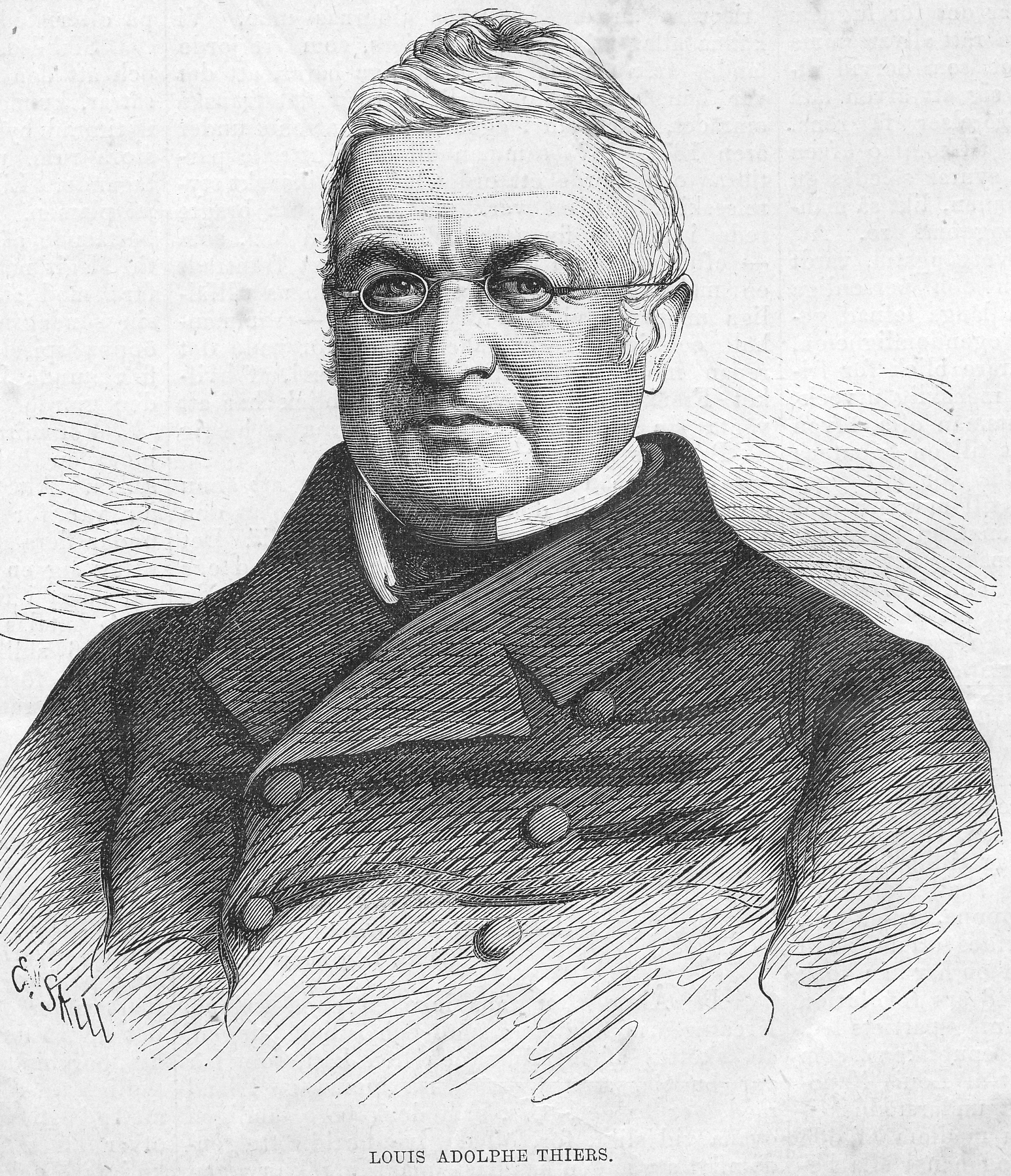
- Adolphe Thiers
- Date formed: 1 March 1840
- Date dissolved: 29 October 1840

People and organisations
- Head of state: Louis Philippe I
- Head of government: Adolphe Thiers

History
- Predecessor: Second cabinet of Nicolas Jean-de-Dieu Soult
- Successor: Third cabinet of Nicolas Jean-de-Dieu Soult

The Second cabinet of Adolphe Thiers was announced on 1 March 1840 by King Louis Philippe I. It replaced the Second cabinet of Nicolas Jean-de-Dieu Soult.

The ministry was replaced on 29 October 1840 by the Third cabinet of Nicolas Jean-de-Dieu Soult.

== Ministers ==
The cabinet was created by ordinance of 1 March 1840. The ministers were:

- President of the Council of Ministers: Adolphe Thiers
- Foreign Affairs: Adolphe Thiers
- Interior:
  - Charles de Rémusat (Minister)
  - Léon de Maleville (Sub-secretary of State, from 2 March 1840)
- Justice and Religious Affairs: Alexandre-François Vivien
- War: Amédée Despans-Cubières
- Finance: Joseph Pelet de la Lozère
- Navy and Colonies: Albin Roussin
- Public Education: Victor Cousin
- Public Works: Hippolyte François Jaubert
- Agriculture and Commerce:
  - Alexandre Goüin (Minister)
  - Adolphe Billault (Sub-secretary of State, from 3 March 1840)

== Sources ==
- Muel, Léon (1891). Gouvernements, ministères et constitutions de la France depuis cent ans: Précis historique des révolutions, des crises ministérielles et gouvernementales, et des changements de constitutions de la France depuis 1789 jusqu'en 1890 ... Marchal et Billard.
