= Second cabinet of Louis Mathieu Molé =

French cabinet from 1837 to 1839

- Cabinet of France

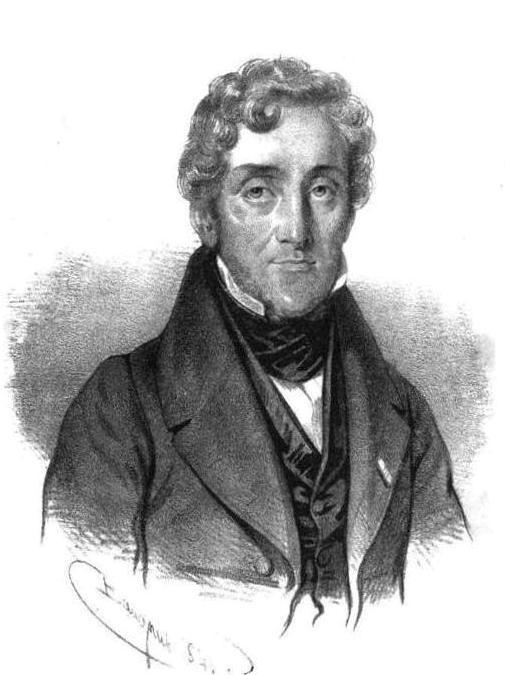
- Louis-Mathieu Molé
- Date formed: 15 April 1837
- Date dissolved: 31 March 1839

People and organisations
- Head of state: Louis Philippe I
- Head of government: Louis-Mathieu Molé

History
- Predecessor: First cabinet of Louis Mathieu Molé
- Successor: Transitional cabinet of 1839

The Second cabinet of Louis Mathieu Molé was announced on 15 April 1837 by King Louis Philippe I. It replaced the First cabinet of Louis Mathieu Molé.

The Chamber of Deputies was dissolved and new elections held on 2 March 1839. The results were not favorable to the government. The members of the cabinet resigned on 8 March 1839. The ministry was replaced on 31 March 1839 by the Transitional cabinet of 1839.

== Ministers ==
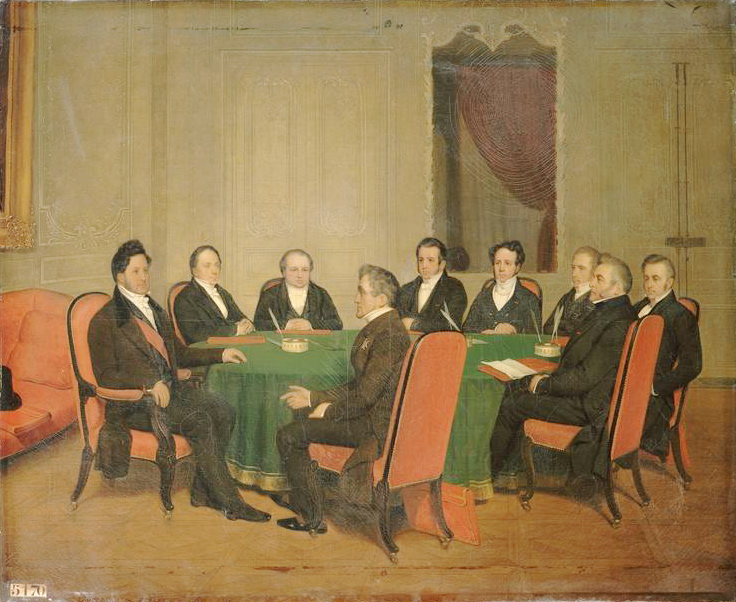
The Council of Ministers presided over by Louis-Philippe on 3 August 1838, by Henri Scheffer

The cabinet was created by ordinance of 15 April 1837. The ministers were:

- President of the council: Louis-Mathieu Molé
- Foreign Affairs: Louis-Mathieu Molé
- Interior: Camille de Montalivet
- Justice and Religious Affairs:
  - Félix Barthe (Minister)
  - Narcisse Parant (Sub-secretary of State from 21 May 1837)
- War: Simon Bernard
- Finance: Jean Lacave-Laplagne
- Navy and Colonies: Claude du Campe de Rosamel
- Public Education: Narcisse-Achille de Salvandy
- Public Works, Agriculture and Commerce: Nicolas Martin du Nord
