= Jean Pelet =

French politician (1759–1842)

Jean Pelet de la Lozère
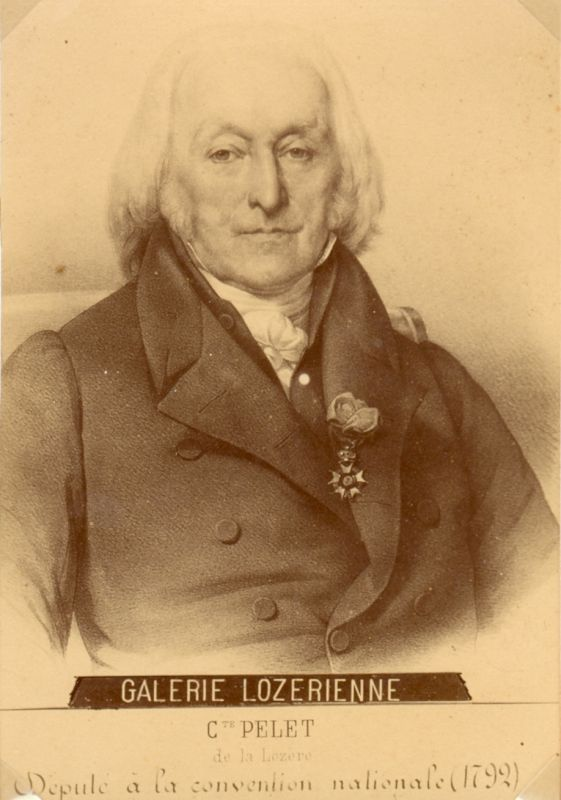
- Portrait of Jean Pelet

Minister of Police
- In office 23 June 1815 – 9 July 1815
- Monarch: Napoleon I
- Preceded by: Joseph Fouché
- Succeeded by: Joseph Fouché

President of the National Convention
- In office 24 March 1795 – 5 April 1795
- Preceded by: Antoine Claire Thibaudeau
- Succeeded by: François-Antoine de Boissy d'Anglas

President of the Council of Five Hundred
- In office 19 June 1796 – 18 July 1796
- Preceded by: Jacques Defermon des Chapelières
- Succeeded by: François-Antoine de Boissy d'Anglas

Personal details
- Born: 23 February 1759 Saint-Jean-du-Gard, Kingdom of France
- Died: 26 January 1842 (aged 82) Paris, Kingdom of France
- Resting place: Père Lachaise Cemetery
- Spouse: Marie Castanier
- Children: Joseph Pelet de la Lozère
- Awards: Commander of the Légion d'honneur; Commander of the Ordre de la Réunion
- Nickname: Pelet de la Lozère

Military service
- Allegiance: France; First French Empire
- Battles/wars: French Revolutionary Wars; War of the First Coalition; War of the Second Coalition; Napoleonic Wars; Hundred Days

Jean Pelet, known as Pelet de la Lozère (23 February 1759 – 26 January 1842) was a French politician.

== Early life ==
Pelet was born 23 February 1759 in Saint-Jean-du-Gard.

He was descended from Pelet, baron de Salgas, who spent 14 years condemned to the galleys after being stripped of his rank and title, having his lands confiscated and his castles razed for refusing to renounce his Protestant faith. (Jean himself was a member of the consistory of the reformed church of Paris and the father of Joseph Pelet de la Lozère (1785–1871), conseiller d'État, peer of France several times a minister in the July Monarchy). Jean was the son of the businessman Jean Pelet and his wife Marie Castanier. He became avocat to the parlement de Provence as a young man and was attached to the bar of Florac.

== Career ==
=== Revolution ===
Like other Protestants, he welcomed the French Revolution. President of the directory of the department of Lozère from 1791 onwards, on 5 September 1792, he was elected a deputy to the French National Convention for his department, coming fourth out of five, with 215 votes. Inclining towards the Girondist position, he was absent on a government commission during the trial of Louis XVI, and supported the opponents of Maximilien Robespierre on 9 thermidor in 1794, saying:

The arbitrary proscriptions that they followed ... are the height of tyranny; it was the arm of the monster from whom you have purged the land, and vowing horror to his execrable memory, you reserve the same torment for perverse, cruel and abominable men who served his raged, and those who tried to imitate just as revolting an example.

As a result, he asked the surviving members of the former Committee of Public Safety to stand down. Becoming secretary of the assembly in October 1794, he proposed substituting the death penalty with banishment on pain of death in certain cases. He presided over the assembly from March to April 1795 during the insurrection of 12 Germinal, Year III and then, after the sitting when the head of député Féraud was shown to the delegates, he said:

You have arrived at this point in the Revolution, when you are no longer allowed to deviate from the path of wisdom. We shall establish our republic, we shall realise the people's vows and their hopes of good fortune and liberty. For five years, impious factions have nourished our easy credulity on vain promises. We shall no longer put off our duties and our rights, for ambition and crime, ignorance and famine will not put off their ravages.

He was sent to the armée des Pyrénées-Orientales and began the negotiations with Spain, which led to the Peace of Basel. After the constitutional session, 71 departments elected him their deputy on the Council of Five Hundred on 23 vendémiaire year 4, including Lozère by 123 votes out of 129. He presided over the council from 19 June 1796, speaking in favour of émigrés' children and the freedom of the press. He left the Council in May 1797 and retired to his birthplace.

=== Consulate and First French Empire ===
After the coup of 18 brumaire, Bonaparte made Pelet prefect of Vaucluse on 11 ventose year 8, then summoned him to join the council of state (in ordinary service from 27 fructidor year 10 to 1810). Pelet was also put in charge of the third arrondissement of the imperial general police in 1805 and then, during the general reorganisation of the police department, he was detached to head up the second division of the imperial general police, embracing 42 departments in the Midi from 1806 to 1813. He held these roles until 1814 and remained loyal to Napoleon's police chief Joseph Fouché, though he and Fouché disliked each other, with Pelet mistrusting him for his intrigues and use of torture. It was Pelet who discovered the Malet conspiracy's ramifications in southern France in 1812.

In 1801 he bought the château du Solier (Lasalle) from the family of Cadolle de Voguë. He also became a conseiller d'Etat in ordinary service from 1810 to 1814 and was also attached to the commission for petitions in 1808 and 1809. He was made commissioner extraordinary in the 9th military division (Montpellier) on 26 December 1813. He was made a knight (9 vendemiaire year 12) then a commander (25 prairial year 12) of the Légion d'honneur, then a comte de l'Empire (18 May 1808) and a commander of the Ordre de la Réunion in 1813.

=== Bourbon Restoration and July Monarchy ===
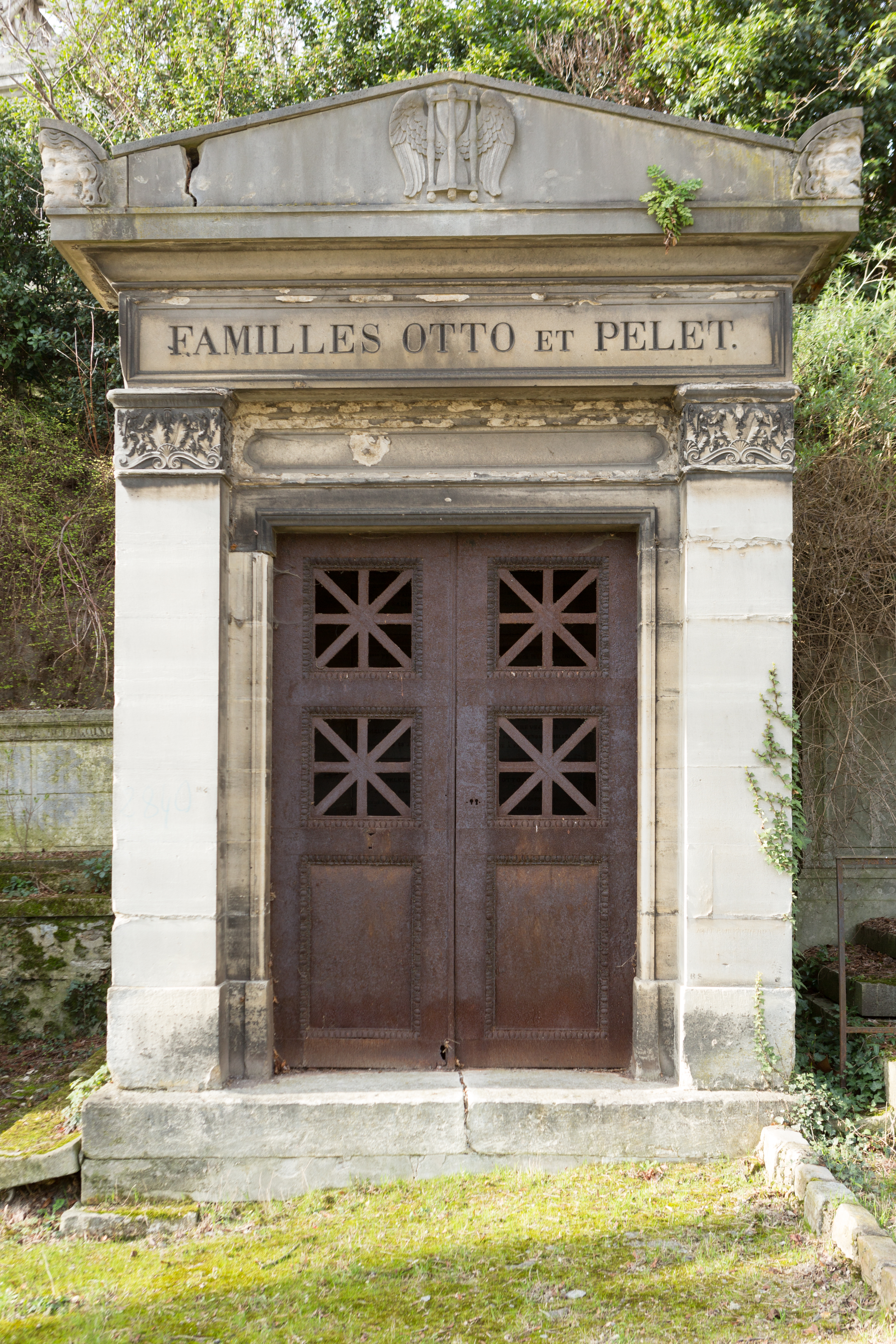
Pelet's tomb in the Père-Lachaise cemetery.

At the First Restoration he retired from office and, though he was made interim minister of police from 23 June to 9 July 1815 during the Hundred Days, he retired again after Waterloo. In return, on 5 March 1819, Louis XVIII made him a peer of France with an annual pension of 4,000 francs. Pelet took an oath in preparation for becoming a member of the upper chamber during the July Monarchy, but ill health meant that he could only attend very occasionally.

== Death ==
He died 26 January 1842 aged 83 in Paris and was buried in the Pere Lachaise cemetery.

== Coat of arms ==
D'azur à trois bandes d'or, au lion d'argent lampassé de même, rampant sur la bande inférieure, bordure de sinople; franc-quartier de comte conseiller d'Etat.

Preceded by Antoine Claire Thibaudeau	President of the French National Convention (24 March 1795 – 5 April 1795)	Succeeded by François-Antoine de Boissy d'Anglas
Preceded by Jacques Defermon des Chapelières	President of the Council of Five Hundred (19 June 1796 – 18 July 1796)	Succeeded by François-Antoine de Boissy d'Anglas
Preceded by Joseph Fouché	Minister of Police (22 June 1815 – 7 July 1815)	Succeeded by Joseph Fouché
