= First cabinet of Adolphe Thiers =

French cabinet of 1836

- Cabinet of France

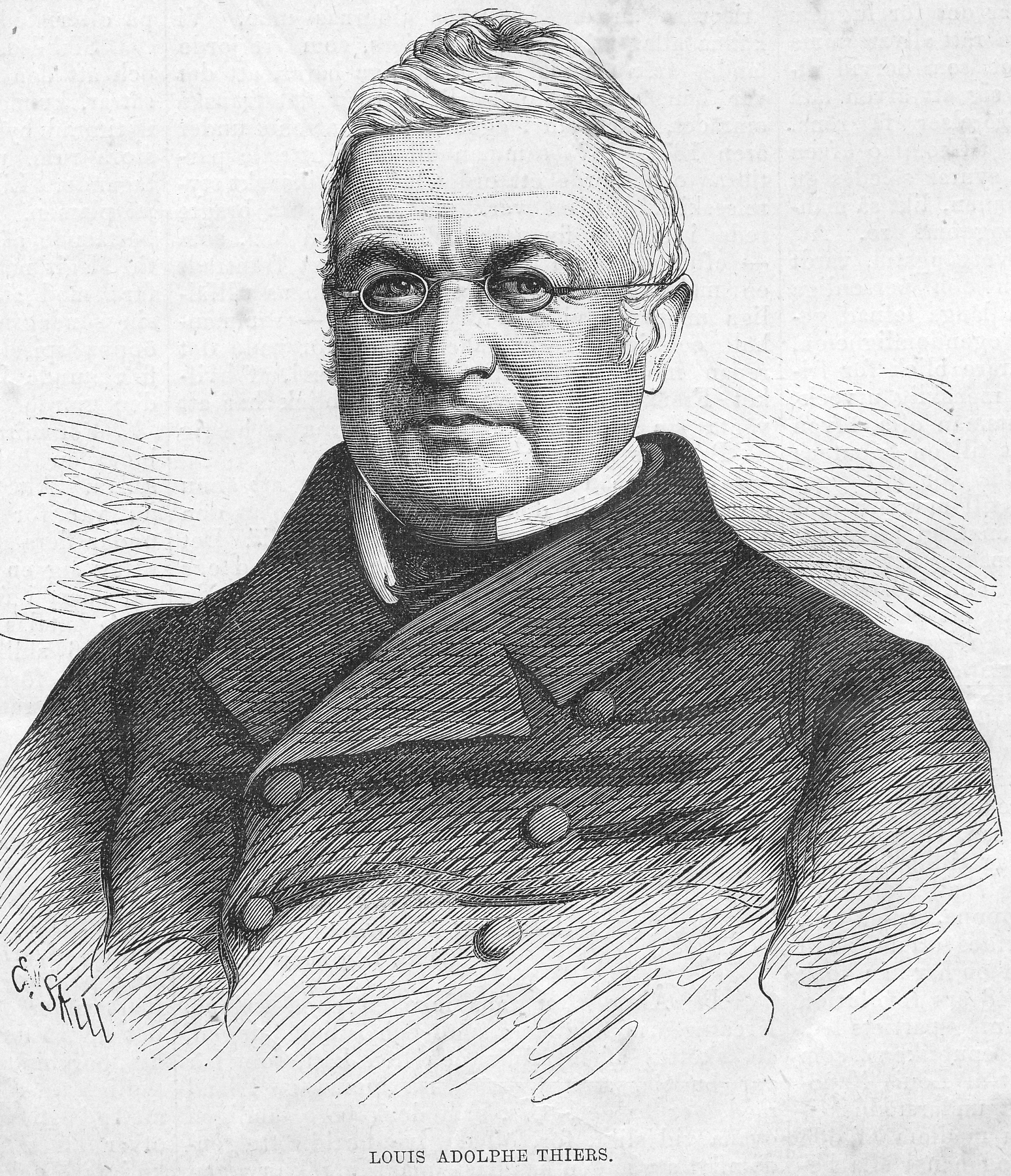
- Adolphe Thiers
- Date formed: 22 February 1836
- Date dissolved: 6 September 1836

People and organisations
- Head of state: Louis Philippe I
- Head of government: Adolphe Thiers

History
- Predecessor: Cabinet of Victor de Broglie
- Successor: First cabinet of Louis Mathieu Molé

The First cabinet of Adolphe Thiers was announced on 22 February 1836 by King Louis Philippe I. It replaced the Cabinet of Victor de Broglie.

Adolphe Thiers resigned on 25 August 1836 when the king refused to accept his recommendation to send troops to destroy the revolutionary party in Spain, which was strongly supported by the Minister of War, Nicolas Joseph Maison. On 6 September 1836 the cabinet was replaced by the First cabinet of Louis Mathieu Molé.

== Ministers ==
The cabinet was created by ordinance of 22 February 1836. The ministers were:

- President of the Council: Adolphe Thiers
- Foreign Affairs: Adolphe Thiers
- Interior: Camille de Montalivet
- Justice and Religious Affairs: Paul Jean Pierre Sauzet
- War: Nicolas Joseph Maison
- Finance: Antoine Maurice Apollinaire d'Argout
- Navy and Colonies: Guy-Victor Duperré
- Public Education: Joseph Pelet de la Lozère
- Commerce and Public Works: Hippolyte Passy
