= Thomas-Augustin de Gasparin =

French military officer and député

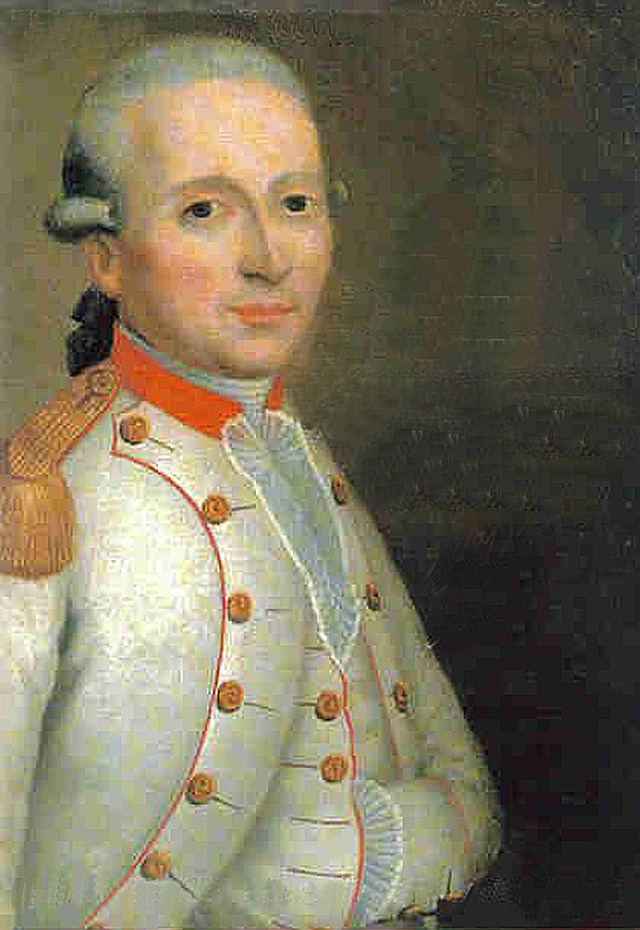
- Anonymous portrait of Gasparin

Député for Bouches-du-Rhône in the National Legislative Assembly
- In office 5 September 1791 – 20 September 1792

Député for Bouches-du-Rhône in the Convention
- In office 21 September 1792 – 11 November 1793

Personal details
- Born: 27 February 1754 Orange, France
- Died: 7 November 1793 (aged 39) Orange, France
- Party: The Mountain

Thomas-Augustin de Gasparin (27 February 1754 at Orange – 7 November 1793 at Orange), was a French military officer and député for the Bouches-du-Rhône departement to the National Legislative Assembly and the Convention.

== Early life ==
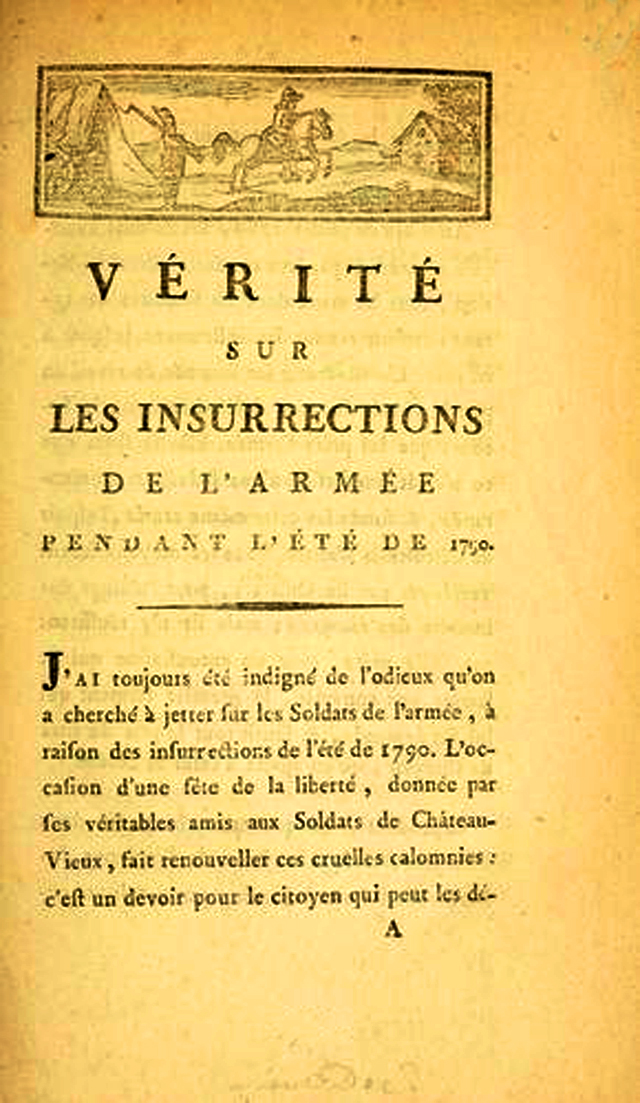
Vérité sur les insurrections de l'armée pendant l'été de 1790, by Thomas-Augustin de Gasparin.

Thomas-Augustin Gasparin came from the cadet branch of the noble Corsican Gaspari family, this branch having adopted Protestantism following the marriage of one of its members with a daughter of the agronomist Olivier de Serres. He was serving as a captain in the Picardy regiment in 1789 when the French Revolution broke out, of which he was an enthusiastic supporter.

In 1790 Gasparin published a short pamphlet, ”Vérité Sur Les Insurrections de L’Armée Pendant L’Été de 1790” (”The Truth About the Insurrections in the Army in the Summer of 1790”), defending the good name of ordinary French soldiers, and blaming corrupt officers for depriving the men of their dues. Late in 1791 another mutiny broke out, in the Picardy regiment, then stationed at Saarlouis, with soldiers demanding their back pay. Gasparin pledged his personal fortune with Jewish money-lenders to raise the necessary funds and calm the revolt.

== National Legislative Assembly ==
Gasparin was elected from Bouches-du-Rhône to the National Legislative Assembly on 5 September 1791 with 397 votes out of 552. He arrived in Paris on 3 October, where he joined the Jacobin Club. On 14 October he was appointed to the Committee for Military Law and Regulations. He also opposed Brissot and the Girondins on the topic of war with Austria. At the Jacobin Club and in the National Assembly he denounced what he called their campaign of panic and lies.” On 10 August he was made Commissar of the Army of the Midi with Lacombe-Saint Michel and Rouyer.

== The Convention ==
Gasparin stood for election from the Bouches-du-Rhône for the new Convention and was elected with 716 votes out of 728. On 26 September 1792, his continuing position on the War Committee was confirmed, and soon afterwards he left for the Dauphiné with his colleagues to visit the encampment of de Montesquiou-Fézensac. The general was subsequently accused, on 9 November, of having negotiated a compromise with the Republic of Geneva instead of occupying the city. Gasparin, Dubois-Crancé and Lacombe Saint-Etienne were ordered by the Convention to dismiss him.

On 3 January 1793, he made a speech in the Convention denouncing the leading Girondins, Guadet, Gensonné and Vergniaud for treason by dealing secretly with the king in July 1792, using the painter Joseph Boze as an intermediary. During the same session, the monarchist Lanjuinais demanded that Gasparin himself be arrested for treason, but nothing came of his initiative.

During the roll-call vote on the sentencing of Louis XVI on 14 January 1793, he voted for death, against a referendum on the sentence, and against reprieve.

Between January and March he worked with his colleagues on the War Committee on the means of building a more professional army to defend the Republic.

On 4 April 1793, he was sent to the Armies of the North and of the Ardennes. He was there when Charles François Dumouriez went over to the Austrians with the young duc de Chartres, son of Louis Philippe d'Orléans, and took all necessary measures to respond to the gravity of the defection.

On 15 May, he was named adjutant general by the Provisional Executive Council. His fellow-deputé for Bouches-du-Rhône, the Girondin Barbaroux, attacked him for this appointment. In response Gasparin wrote from Lille to both the Committee of Public Safety and the Convention, summarising his loyal work as représentant en mission and his military achievements.

== Committee of Public Safety ==
Together with Jeanbon Saint André he joined the Committee of Public Safety on 13 June 1793, replacing Robert Lindet and Jean-Baptiste Treilhard. On 16 June, before leaving for the Vendée, he proposed a decree imposing the death penalty for French citizens and foreigners alike found guilty of spying in war zones or in the armies, which was adopted by the Convention. In the Vendée, he drew up a report on the military situation and returned to Paris. During the voting on 10 July to determine who should next serve on the Committee, Gasparin was retained - the sole career soldier on it at that time - even though under Danton's leadership, its conduct of the war was heavily criticised.

Gasparin had mixed views about the case of general Custine, supporting him because of the need for proper organisation in the army and the lack of superior officers; but nevertheless not disagreeing with the Committee's arrest of Custine on 2 July. The following day however he resigned, mentioning that he had very serious health problems - earlier in the year he had been obliged to give up his mission to the Army of the North because of a severe case of swollen glands and pain in his sides. Maximilien Robespierre replaced him on the committee.

Gasparin was next sent first to the army of the Alps and then to Marseille, from where he went on to Toulon. His exemplary conduct during the siege of Toulon played an important part in recovering the town from the British.

== Death ==
At Aix-en-Provence, he met the young officer Napoleon Bonaparte, introduced to him by Augustin Robespierre and Christophe Saliceti. Napoleon read aloud to them from his pamphlet ”Le souper de Beaucaire” and the representatives of the Convention decided to have it printed at Valence at public expense. In a letter to the Committee of Public Safety, Gasparin and Saliceti recommended Bonaparte to replace the artillery commander Elzéar Auguste Cousin de Dommartin, who had been wounded in combat at the Ollioules gorges. Their recommendation was accepted.

Fighting at Toulon was fierce and Gasparin took part in the assaults, being one of the first to enter the great bastion. The Committee of Public Safety recognised his efforts and, in the light of his continuing ill health, sent Barras and Fréron to support him and Saliceti. On 15 Brumaire Year II (5 November 1793), he sent a letter to the Convention conveying his confident expectation of the fall of Toulon. This was to be his last letter and he did not live to see the city retaken. He caught pneumonia and was taken to his family in Orange. He died on 17 Brumaire Year II (7 November 1793).

On Saint Helena, Napoleon later bequeathed a sum of one hundred thousand francs to Gasparin's heirs, because he had, Napoleon said in his will, “through his protection, sheltered me from the persecutions of the ignorance of staff officers who commanded the army of Toulon before Dugommier arrived.”

He was buried in the Protestant cemetery in the rue Saint-Clément in Orange. An initiative to place his heart in the Panthéon, adopted by the Convention, was never carried out.

== Family ==
Gasparin married Marie-Anne Marguerite de Serres. Both his son Adrien de Gasparin and his grandson Agénor de Gasparin were important public figures in French political life.
