= Ceyzériat =

Commune in Auvergne-Rhône-Alpes, France

- Commune
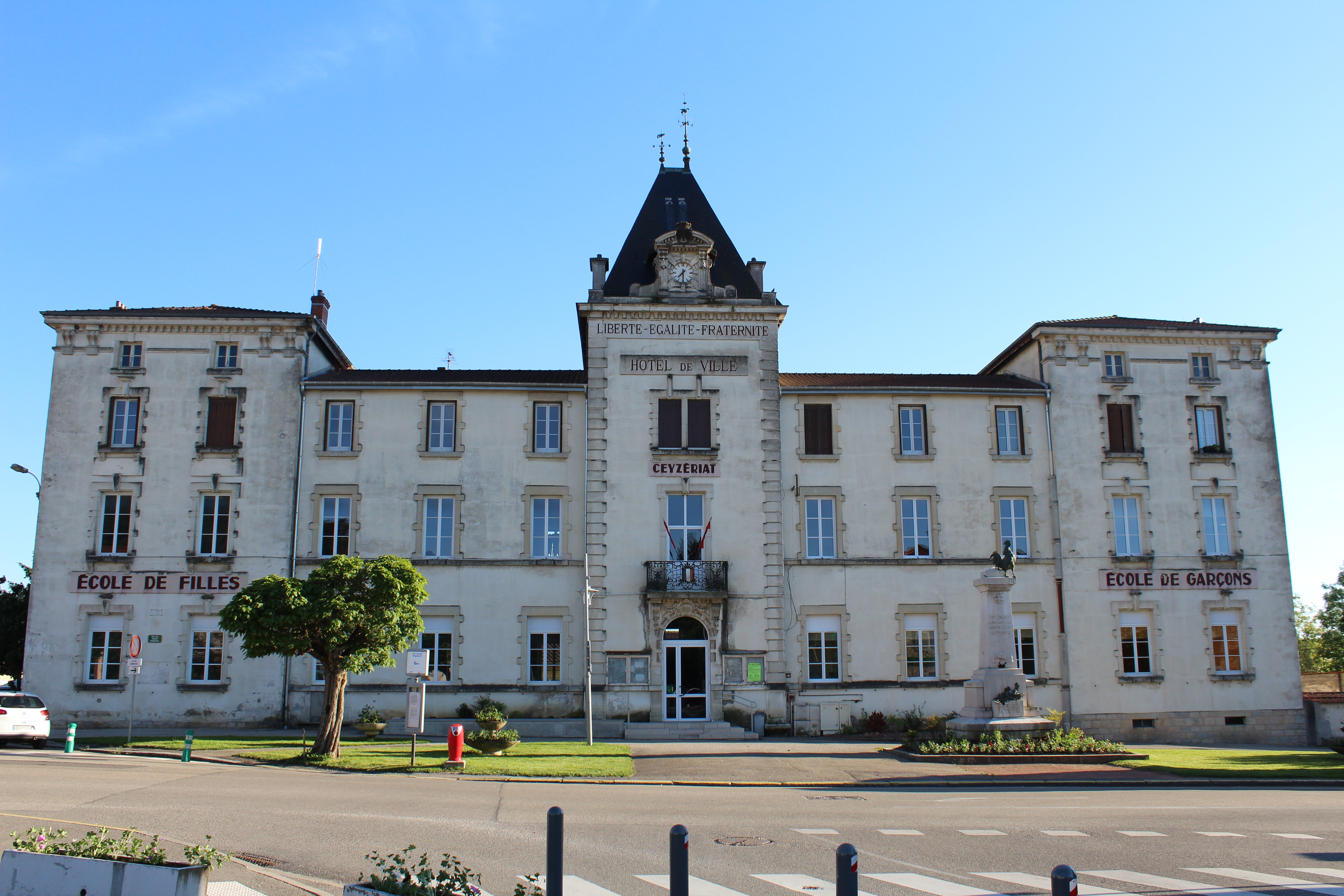
- Historic hôtel de ville

- Coat of arms
- Location of Ceyzériat
- Location within France Location within Auvergne-Rhône-Alpes
- Coordinates: 46°10′44″N 5°19′26″E
- Country: France
- Region: Auvergne-Rhône-Alpes
- Department: Ain
- Arrondissement: Bourg-en-Bresse
- Canton: Ceyzériat
- Intercommunality: Bassin de Bourg-en-Bresse

Government
  - Mayor (2026–32): Jean-Yves Flochon
- Area^{1}: 9.36 km^{2} (3.61 sq mi)
- Elevation: 338 m (1,109 ft)
- Highest elevation: 585 m (1,919 ft)
- Lowest elevation: 240 m (790 ft)
- Population (2023): 3,328
  - Density: 356/km^{2} (921/sq mi)
- Time zone: UTC+01:00 (CET)
  - Summer (DST): UTC+02:00 (CEST)
- INSEE/Postal code: 01072 /01250
- ^{1} French Land Register data, which excludes lakes, ponds, glaciers > 1 km^{2} (0.386 sq mi or 247 acres) and river estuaries.

Ceyzériat (French pronunciation: [sɛzeʁja]) is a commune in the Ain department, Auvergne-Rhône-Alpes region in eastern France. Ceyzériat station has rail connections to Bourg-en-Bresse and Oyonnax.

== History ==
Hippolyte Paul Jayr, twice minister during the July Monarchy, was mayor of the commune at the end of the 19th century. The French archaeologist and assyriologist Maurice Pézard (1876–1923) died in this commune.

== Geography ==
=== Climate ===
Ceyzériat has an oceanic climate (Köppen climate classification Cfb). The average annual temperature in Ceyzériat is 11.7 °C (53.1 °F). The average annual rainfall is 1,032.6 mm (40.65 in) with November as the wettest month. The temperatures are highest on average in July, at around 20.4 °C (68.7 °F), and lowest in January, at around 3.1 °C (37.6 °F). The highest temperature ever recorded in Ceyzériat was 39.2 °C (102.6 °F) on 4 August 2022; the coldest temperature ever recorded was −17.6 °C (0.3 °F) on 20 December 2009.

Climate data for Ceyzériat (1991–2020 averages, extremes 1994−present)
Month	Jan	Feb	Mar	Apr	May	Jun	Jul	Aug	Sep	Oct	Nov	Dec	Year
Record high °C (°F)	18.4 (65.1)	20.5 (68.9)	25.4 (77.7)	28.4 (83.1)	32.9 (91.2)	36.7 (98.1)	38.5 (101.3)	39.2 (102.6)	33.6 (92.5)	27.3 (81.1)	22.5 (72.5)	17.4 (63.3)	39.2 (102.6)
Mean daily maximum °C (°F)	6.1 (43.0)	8.1 (46.6)	12.9 (55.2)	16.9 (62.4)	20.8 (69.4)	24.7 (76.5)	26.6 (79.9)	26.4 (79.5)	21.9 (71.4)	17.0 (62.6)	10.5 (50.9)	6.7 (44.1)	16.5 (61.7)
Daily mean °C (°F)	3.1 (37.6)	4.1 (39.4)	7.6 (45.7)	11.2 (52.2)	15.1 (59.2)	18.7 (65.7)	20.4 (68.7)	20.1 (68.2)	16.2 (61.2)	12.6 (54.7)	7.0 (44.6)	3.8 (38.8)	11.7 (53.1)
Mean daily minimum °C (°F)	0.1 (32.2)	0.2 (32.4)	2.3 (36.1)	5.4 (41.7)	9.3 (48.7)	12.7 (54.9)	14.2 (57.6)	13.9 (57.0)	10.6 (51.1)	8.2 (46.8)	3.6 (38.5)	0.9 (33.6)	6.8 (44.2)
Record low °C (°F)	−15.3 (4.5)	−17.0 (1.4)	−13.2 (8.2)	−5.5 (22.1)	−1.3 (29.7)	2.1 (35.8)	5.3 (41.5)	3.3 (37.9)	−0.7 (30.7)	−7.1 (19.2)	−11.4 (11.5)	−17.6 (0.3)	−17.6 (0.3)
Average precipitation mm (inches)	81.1 (3.19)	69.1 (2.72)	74.5 (2.93)	85.8 (3.38)	101.3 (3.99)	75.5 (2.97)	80.9 (3.19)	86.5 (3.41)	79.5 (3.13)	103.9 (4.09)	108.0 (4.25)	86.5 (3.41)	1,032.6 (40.65)
Average precipitation days (≥ 1.0 mm)	12.0	10.3	10.0	9.8	11.1	9.1	8.5	8.8	8.6	10.9	11.3	12.7	123.2
Source: Meteociel

== Politics and administration ==
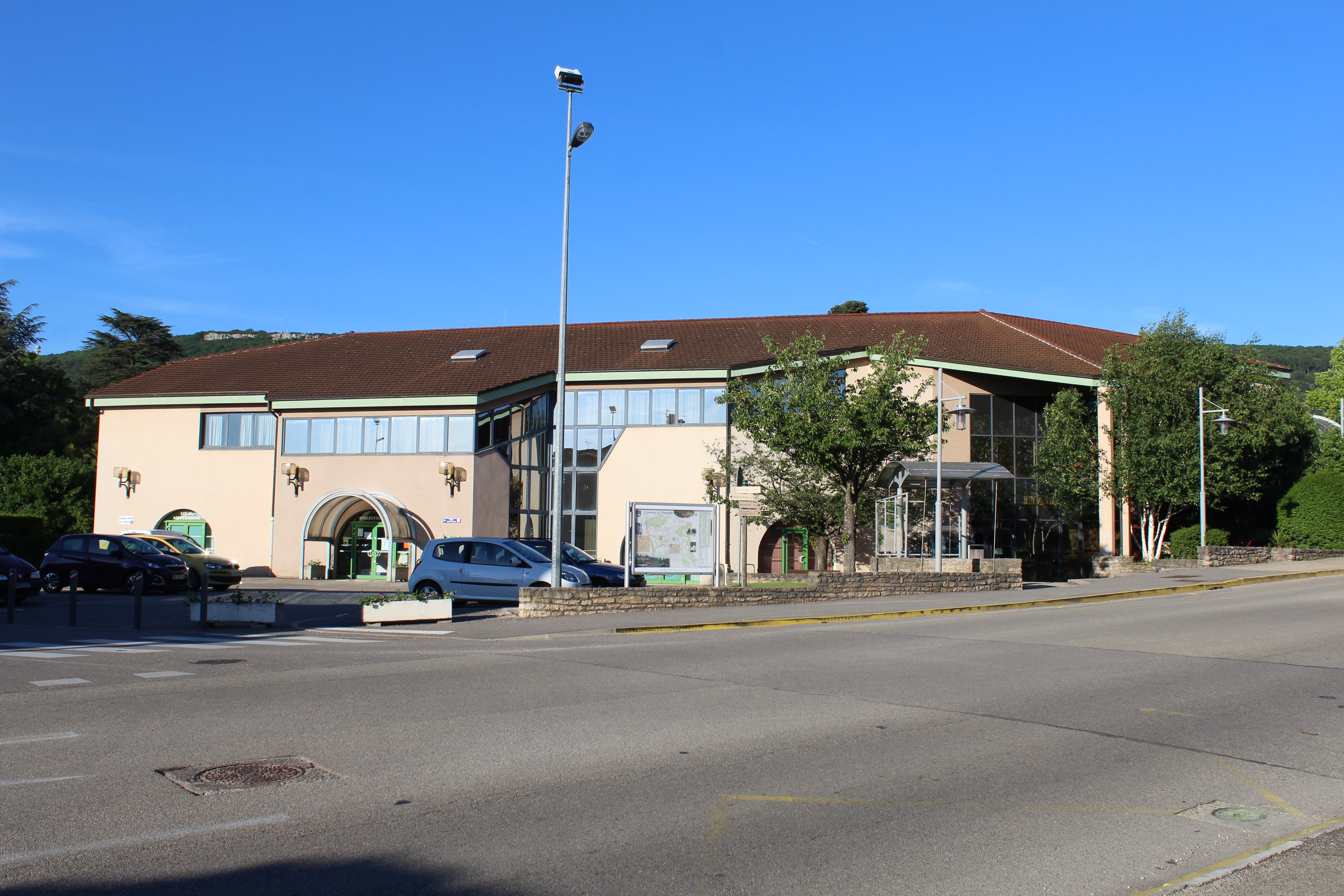
Present-day town hall

List of mayors of Ceyzériat
In office		Name	Party	Capacity	Ref.
1945	1976	Émile Bouvard	Rad.	General councillor for the Canton of Ceyzériat	
March 1977	March 1983	Albert Métras	DVD		
March 1983	June 1995	Camille Cornier			
June 1995	March 2001	Jacques Michon			
March 2001	Incumbent	Jean-Yves Flochon	UMP-LR	Departmental councillor	

== Population ==
Historical population
Year	Pop.	±% p.a.
1968	1,503	—
1975	1,761	+2.29%
1982	1,956	+1.51%
1990	2,058	+0.64%
1999	2,390	+1.68%
2007	2,594	+1.03%
2012	2,939	+2.53%
2017	3,157	+1.44%
2023	3,328	+0.88%
Source: INSEE

== See also ==
- Communes of the Ain department
