= Antoine Claire Thibaudeau =

French politician (1765–1854)

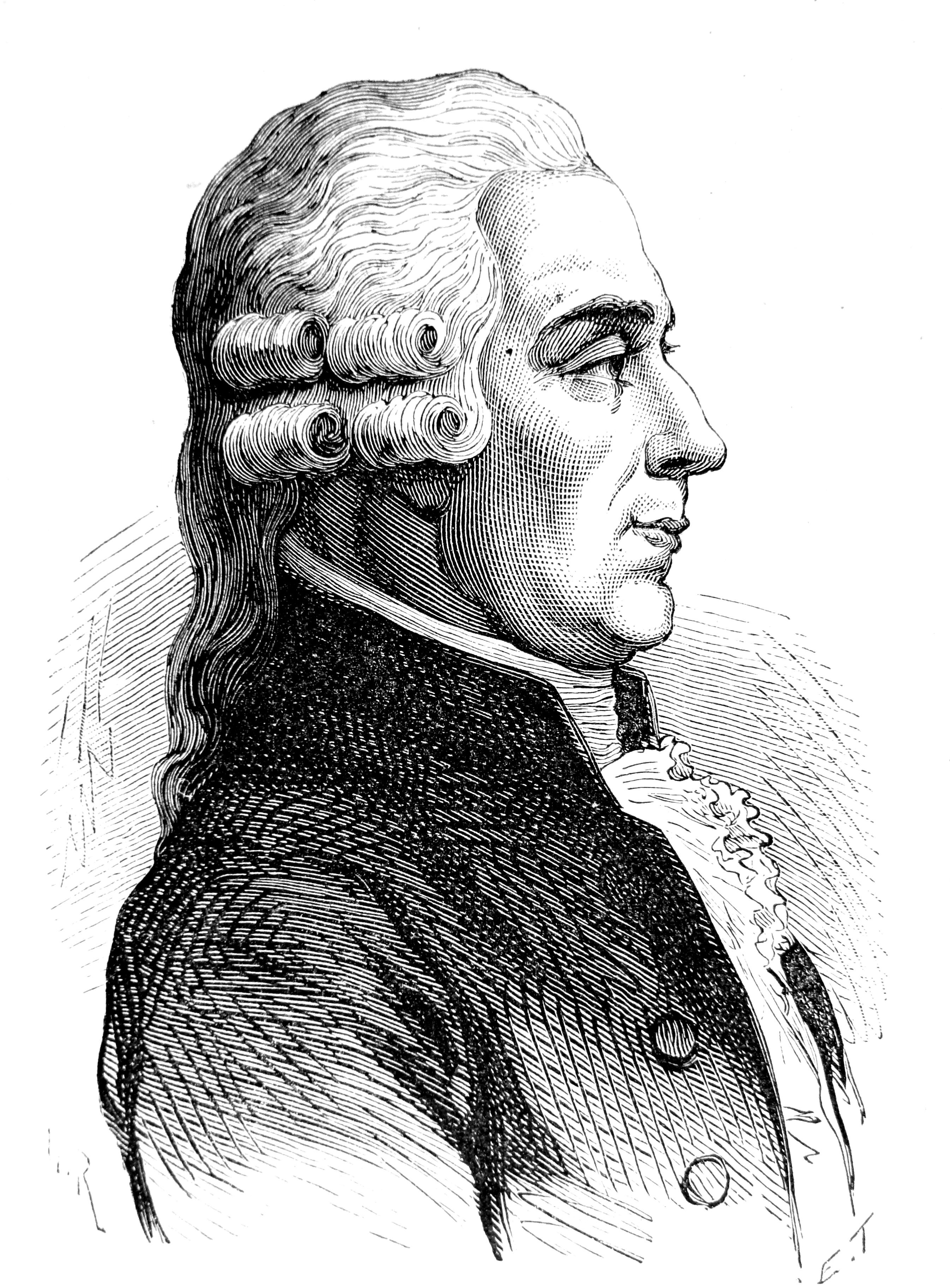

President of the National Convention
- In office 6 March 1795 – 24 March 1795
- Preceded by: François Louis Bourdon
- Succeeded by: Jean Pelet

Personal details
- Born: 23 March 1765 Poitiers, Kingdom of France
- Died: 8 March 1854 (aged 88) Paris, France
- Party: The Mountain
- Parent: Antoine de Thibaudeau
- Occupation: Politician

Antoine Claire, Comte Thibaudeau (23 March 1765 – 8 March 1854) was a French politician.

== Early life ==
He was the son of Antoine de Thibaudeau (1739–1813), who was a lawyer of Poitiers and a deputy to the Estates-General of 1789. He was admitted to the bar in 1787, and in 1789 accompanied his father to the Estates-General at Versailles. When he returned to Poitiers in October he immediately set up a local revolutionary club, and in 1792 was returned as a deputy to the National Convention.

== Career ==
Thibaudeau joined the party of the Mountain and voted unconditionally for the death of Louis XVI. Nevertheless, he incurred a certain amount of suspicion because he declined to join the Jacobin Club. In May 1793 he was on a special mission in the west and prevented his département from joining the Federalist movement. Thibaudeau occupied himself more particularly with educational business, notably in the organization of the museum of the Louvre. It was he who secured the inclusion of Tom Paine's name in the amnesty of Girondist deputies.

Secretary and then president of the convention for a short period, he served on the Committee of Public Safety and of General Security. After the royalist insurrection of 13 Vendémiaire (5 October 1795) he opposed those Thermidorians who wished to postpone the dissolution of the convention. At the elections for the Corps Législatif he was elected by no less than thirty-two départements. It was only by the intervention of Boulay de la Meurthe that he escaped transportation after the coup d'etat of 18 Fructidor (4 September 1797), and he then returned to the practice of his profession.

The establishment of the Consulate brought him back to public life. He was made prefect of the Gironde, and then a member of the council of state, in which capacity he worked on the civil code. He at this time had Napoleon's confidence, and gave him wholehearted support. He did not entirely conceal his disapproval of the foundation of the Legion of Honour, of the Concordat and of Napoleon's acceptance of the consulate for life, and his appointment as prefect of the Bouches-du-Rhône, with consequent banishment from Paris, was a semi-disgrace.

== Exile ==
A peer of the Hundred Days, he fled at the second Restoration to Lausanne. During his exile he lived in Vienna, Prague, Augsburg and Brussels, occupying himself with his Mémoires sur la Convention et le Directoire (Paris, 2 vols., 1824); Mémoires sur le Consulat: par un ancien conseiller d'état (Paris, 1827); Histoire générale de Napoléon Bonaparte (6 vols., Paris and Stuttgart, 1827–28, vol. iii. not printed); Le Consulat et l'Empire, vol. i. of which is identical with vol. vi. of the Histoire de Napoléon (10 vols., 1834). The revolution of 1830 permitted his return to France, and he lived to become a member of the Imperial Senate under the Second Empire.

== Death ==
He died in Paris on 8 March 1854 in his eighty-ninth year, being the last living member of the National Convention during the French Revolution to vote in the trial of Louis XVI.

== Works ==
The special value of Thibaudeau's works arises from the fact that he wrote only of those events of which he had personal knowledge, and that he quotes with great accuracy Napoleon's actual words. His Mémoires sur le Consulat has been translated into English, with introduction and necessary notes, by G. K. Fortescue with the title of Bonaparte and the Consulate (1908). Among the papers left by Thibaudeau were documents entitled Ma Biographie and Mémoires avant ma nomination à la Convention. These were published in a small volume (Paris and Niort, 1875) which includes a list of his works and of the narrative of his life.
