= Valérie de Gasparin =

Swiss woman of letters (1813–1894)

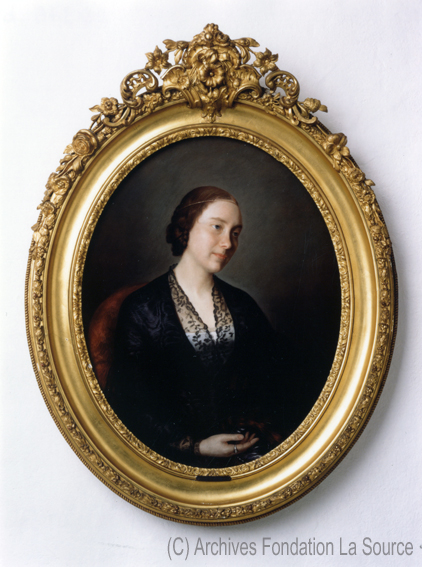
Valérie de Gasparin

Valérie Boissier, comtesse de Gasparin (13 September 1813 – 1894) was a Swiss woman of letters. She was a spokeswoman in topics such as freedom, equality and creativity.

== Biography ==
She was born at Geneva. She published her first work, Voyage of an Ignorant Woman in the South of France and Italy, in 1832.

She married Agénor de Gasparin in 1837.

She and her husband were devout Christians; they were members of the Church of the Canton of Vaud and were involved in the foundation of the Union of the Free Evangelical Churches of France.

She lived a great part of her life in the canton of Vaud, Switzerland, and was a prolific writer on religion, social topics and travel. She was conspicuous as an opponent of religious and social innovations. Several of her books were translated into English, the books of 1859 being read very widely in the United States in their English form. Her last book, El Sonador, was published just before her death in 1894.

She opened, with her husband, the first nursing school in the world, the L’école La Source.

== Works ==
In addition to a number of translations of English and American authors, she published:

- Le mariage au point de vue chrétien, a work which won the Montyon prize from the French Academy (Marriage from the Christian Point of View, 1843)
- Allons faire fortune à Paris (Let's Go Make a Fortune in Paris, 1844)
- Un livre pour les femmes mariées (A Book for Wives, 1845)
- Il y a des pauvres à Paris et ailleurs, which also won the Montyon prize (There are Poor in Paris and Elsewhere, 1846)
- Quelques défauts des Chrétiens d'aujourd'hui (1853)
- Des corporations monastiques au sein du protestantisme (1855)
- Les horizons prochains (The Near Horizon, 1859)
- Les horizons célestes (The Heavenly Horizons, 1859)
- Vesper (1861)
- Les tristesses humaines (Human Sadness, 1863)
- Au bord de la mer (By the Sea Shore, 1866)
- La lèpre sociale (1870)
- Journey in the South by an Ignoramus
- Read and Judge, strictures on the Salvation Army
- Under French Skies or Sunny Fields and Shady Woods (1888)
- Edelweiss: poésies; l’auteur des horizons prochains (1890)
- Sur les montagnes (1890)

== Family ==
She and Agénor did not have any children; however, they raised their nieces after their mother’s death.
