= Joseph Pelet de la Lozère =

French administrator and politician

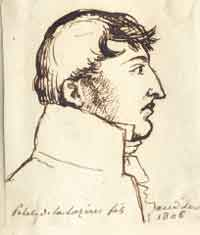
- Pelet de la Lozère, Auditor (1806) by his fellow-auditor Frédéric-Christophe d'Houdetot
- Born: Privat Joseph Claramont, comte Pelet de la Lozère; 12 July 1785; Saint-Jean-du-Gard, Gard, France
- Died: 9 February 1871 (aged 85); Villers-Cotterêts, Aisne, France
- Occupations: Lawyer, politician

Privat Joseph Claramont, comte Pelet de la Lozère (12 July 1785 – 9 February 1871) was a French administrator and politician. He served under the regime of Napoleon, and as a prefect under the Bourbon Restoration. He was a Deputy from 1827 until 1837, when he was made a Peer of France. He was Minister of Education in 1836 and Minister of Finance in 1840.

== Early years ==
Privat Joseph Claramont, Count Pelet de la Lozère, was born on 12 July 1785 in Saint-Jean-du-Gard, Gard. He was the oldest son of Jean Pelet de la Lozère (1759–1842), a deputy to the French National Convention, and of Marie Antoinette Rodier. Joseph Pelet joined the administration in the year VIII as a supernumerary at the Ministry of Interior. He was appointed auditor to the Council of State and Director of the Crown Forests in 1806. He was made Master of Requests in 1811 and administrator of the domaine extraordinaire in 1814.

== Bourbon Restoration ==
During the Bourbon Restoration Pelet served from 24 February 1819 until 1823 as Prefect of Loir-et-Cher. He was dismissed in 1823 by Jacques-Joseph Corbière due to suspicion of being a liberal, and perhaps also for being a Protestant. On 17 November 1827 he was elected deputy for the first district of Loir-et-Cher (Blois) and for the 2nd district of Loir-et-Cher (Vendôme). He chose to represent Blois. He took his seat on the center-left, and voted against the cabinet of Jules de Polignac. Pelet was reelected for Blois on 12 July 1830.

== July monarchy ==
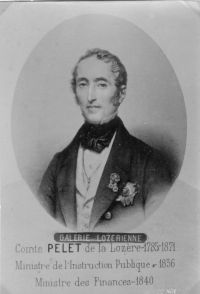
A later portrait of Pelet

Pelet strongly supported the July Monarchy of 1830. He was reelected to Blois on 5 July 1831 and again on 21 June 1834. After the Cabinet of Édouard Adolphe Mortier was dissolved in February 1835 due to internal divisions, Marshal Soult was invited to form a new cabinet. He offered a post to Pelet, but Soult's proposed cabinet was blocked by the personal influence of king Louis Philippe.

Pelet was appointed Minister of Public Education on 22 February 1836 in the First cabinet of Adolphe Thiers. The Pelet Law encouraged communes to have at least one primary school for girls. The Thiers cabinet was dissolved on 6 September 1836 due to a serious disagreement between the king and his advisers over policy regarding Spain. On leaving office Pelet became a leading member of the opposition to the government of Louis-Mathieu Molé. In October 1837 he was promoted to the Chamber of Peers.

As a peer Pelet supported the regime, but sometimes expressed independent views. The Molé government fell in April 1839, followed by a prolonged ministerial crisis. On 1 March 1840 Thiers was again called upon to form a cabinet from the center-left, and Pelet de la Lozère was given the Finance portfolio. On 21 October 1840 he resigned due to a crisis in Eastern affairs. He remained in the House of Peers until the February Revolution of 1848 returned him to private life.

Joseph Pelet de la Lozère died on 9 February 1871 in Villers-Cotterêts, Aisne, aged 85.

== Works ==
- Précis de l'histoire des Etats-Unis (1840)
