= Albert Pézard =

French endocrinologist

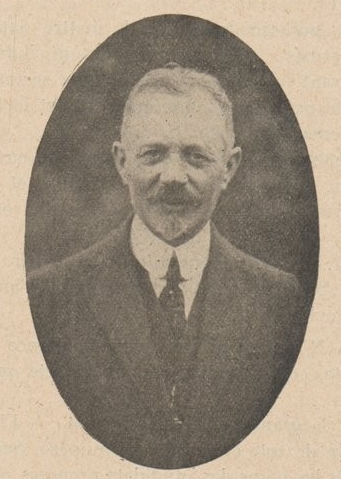
Pezard in 1927

Paul-Louis-Albert Pézard (1 April 1875 – 21 November 1927) was a French biologist who studied endocrine secretions, growth and development, and was among the first to come up with laws concerning allometry which he termed as heterogony. He also proposed an all-or-none law of endocrinology, that secondary sexual characters were displayed or switched on upon hormone inducement and did not vary in expression with the quantity of hormones injected.

Pezard was born in Neuflize, Ardennes, in a farming family, and was educated at the Ecole normale de Charleville after which he became teacher at various schools in Mouzon, Vierzon, Auteuil and Chaptal. He became a professor of natural sciences, teaching at the Colbert and then the Jean-Baptiste Say schools. He became a professor at the Ecole normale supérieure of Saint-Cloud. He then went to study under Eugène Gley, a founding figure of French endocrinology. He then worked at the physiological station of the College de France. His studies included endocrine gland effects on secondary sexual character development, sex transformation, hermaphroditism, gynandromorphy, and the use of testicular gland grafts and hormone injections on chickens. He was in the military service between 1917 and 1918. In 1922 he began to work with Fernand Caridroit (1895-1950) and Knud Sand. He died suddenly from Angina Pectoris and was buried at Boulogne-sur-Seine after a funeral at the Notre-Dame d'Auteuil.
