= Maurice Pézard =

Maurice Pézard (27 May 1876, Reims – 7 October 1923, Ceyzériat) was a French archaeologist and assyriologist.

== Biographie ==
He studied at the École du Louvre and presented in 1905 his thesis entitled Nouveaux faits grammaticaux d'après les collections chaldéennes du musée du Louvre.

Attached to the mission to Susa (1909) then to the Département des antiquités orientales of the Musée du Louvre, he helped Edmond Pottier in the excavations at Kedesh (1921-1922).

== Works ==
- 1912: Un nouveau poids de l'époque Kassite
- 1913: Catalogue des antiquités de la Susiane au musée du Louvre
- 1920: La Céramique archaïque de l'islam
- 1931: Qadesh-Mission archéologique à Tell Nebi Mend. 1921-1922, Bibliothèque archéologique et historique du Service des antiquités de Syrie

== Bibliography ==
- Edmond Pottier, Maurice Pézard, in Syria issue 4, 1923, (p. 344–345)
- François Pouillon, Dictionnaire des orientalistes de langue française, Karthala, 2012, (p. 803–804)
- Ève Gran-Aymerich, Les chercheurs de passé, Editions du CNRS, 2007, (p. 1057)
