= Agénor de Gasparin =

French statesman and author

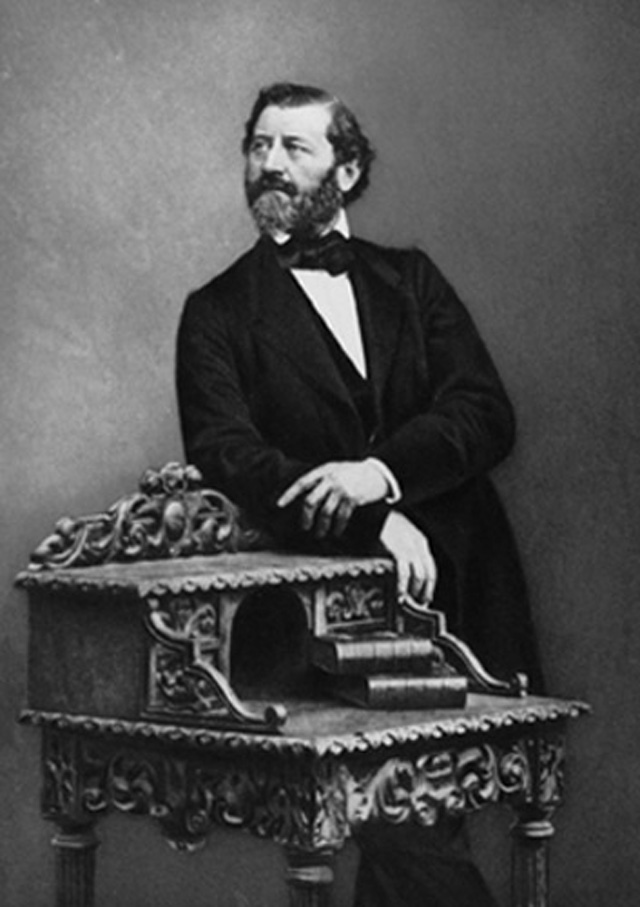
- Born: 12 July 1810; Orange, Vaucluse
- Died: 4 May 1871 (aged 60); Geneva
- Occupations: Statesman, psychical researcher, writer

Agénor Étienne, comte de Gasparin (12 July 1810 – 4 May 1871) was a French statesman and writer. He was also an early psychical researcher known for conducting experiments into table-tipping.

== Biography ==
He was born at Orange, Vaucluse, the son of Adrien de Gasparin. In 1836 he entered the service of his father, then minister of the interior, as chief of a department, became master of requests in the Council of State in 1837, and in 1842 was elected to the Chamber of Deputies from Bastia in Corsica. He was an advocate of religious liberty, prison reform, abolition of slavery, and the rights of the Protestant church, of which he was a member. His independence was not relished by the government, and his sympathy for Protestantism was not shared by his constituents. He was thus voted out of office in 1846, and put all of his enthusiasm into his written work.

When the revolution of 1848 took place, he was asked to declare himself in favor of the new constitution. He refused. His disapproval of the form later given to the government by Louis Napoleon was even stronger, and he permanently moved to Switzerland.

From 1849 until his death, he lived at Geneva. In the winter, he delivered courses of lectures on economical, historical, and religious subjects, many of which were subsequently published. During the Franco-German War he addressed an appeal to the French people urging them not to persevere in it. His death was hastened by his exertions in the care of refugees from Bourbaki's army, whom he received into his house.

== Spiritualism ==
In 1853, Gasparin with a group of his friends conducted experiments into table-tipping at his home. The experiments were conducted over a period of five months. He recorded the activity of table movements which he believed were the result of a physical force emanating from the bodies of the sitters. He proposed a theory of fluidic action (termed "ectenic force"), which he believed could explain the phenomena.

Professor Marc Thury (1822–1905) from the University of Geneva who also attended some of the experiments supported Gasparin's conclusions in a pamphlet in 1855, and conducted some of his own experiments in which similar results were obtained. The physicist and spiritualist William Crookes was influenced by Gasparin's experiments. The experiments were also endorsed by A. Campbell Holms.

Camille Flammarion provided summaries of the work of de Gasparin and Thury. Critics like Frank Podmore argued that the conditions were insufficient to prevent trickery.

The table-tipping experiments were heavily criticized by Louis Figuier. He noted that Gasperin's claim of the movement of tables without material contact was a "physical impossibility" and that he was never able to reproduce the phenomena before the French scientific community. He stated that "to admit reality of the elevation of a table, without any contact, it would have to be reproduced several times, and at will, in experiences with other observers. This has never arrived; which leads one to conclude that any connivance slipped into the experiments."

== Works ==
He published numerous articles in the Journal des Débats and the Revue des Deux Mondes. Among his books were:

On the separation of church and state:

- Les intérêts généraux du protestantisme français (1843)
- Christianisme et paganisme (Christianity and Paganism; 2 vols. 8vo, 1846)

On the abolition of slavery:

- Esclavage et traite (1838)
- Un grand peuple qui se relève, argues for the justice of the Union cause in the American Civil War (The Uprising of a Great People, 1861)
- L'Amérique devant l'Europe, another book advocating the Union cause, translated into English as America Before Europe (1862)

On the reform of home life:

- La famille, ses devoirs, ses joies et ses douleurs (2 vols. 12mo, 1865)
- La liberté morale (1863)
- La conscience (1872)
- L'ennemi de la famille (1874)

On the Franco-German War:

- La déclaration de guerre, un protêt (1870)
- La république neutre d'Alsace (1870)
- Appel au patriotisme et au bon sens (1871)

Other works:

- De l'amortissement (1834)
- Des tables tournantes, du surnaturel en général et des esprits (2 vols. 12mo, 1854; translated into English)
- La question du Neufchâtel (1857)
- Science vs. modern spiritualism: A treatise on turning tables, the supernatural in general and spirits (1857)
- Liberal Christianity (1869)

His biography of Innocent III, Vie d'Innocent III, was published posthumously in 1873.

== Family ==
His wife, Valérie Boissier de Gasparin, was a noted writer.
