= Hippolyte Paul Jayr =

French politician

- Born: 25 December 1801; Bourg-en-Bresse, Ain, France
- Died: 1900; Ceyzériat, Aiin, France
- Occupation: Administrator
- Known for: Minister of Public Works

Hippolyte Paul Jayr (25 December 1801 - 1900) was a French administrator and politician. He was Minister of Public Works in the last year of the July Monarchy.

== Life ==
Hippolyte Paul Jayr was born in Bourg-en-Bresse, Ain, on 25 December 1801. He was descended from Hiérosme Jayr of Bourg, the king's counsellor and secretary in the royal court of Bourg until that court was suppressed in 1662, and later a member of the Parliament of Metz. His parents were Benoit-Marie Jayr, an advocate, and Lucie-Marie-Françoise Dévote Roussel. he married Rose-Mathilde Chatard.

Hippolyte Paul Jayr studied law in Paris, then entered the administration in 1830. He was councillor, then secretary-general of the prefecture of Ain (August 1830). He became prefect of Ain on 25 May 1834. He then became in turn prefect of the departments of Loire (23 Juny 1837), Moselle (20 October 1838) and Rhone (23 May 1839). He was a strong supporter of the monarchy.

On 9 July 1845 Jahr was promoted to the Chamber of Peers. That year he was made a knight of the Legion of Honor. He was prefect of Lyon until being named to the cabinet on 9 May 1847 as Minister of Public Works. He presented various railway projects to the chamber of deputies. He also reported on mines, bridges and roads. With the February Revolution of 1848 he returned to private life.
