= Narcisse Parant =

French lawyer

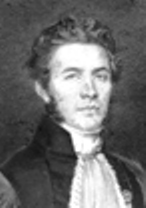
- Born: 5 February 1794; Metz, Moselle, France
- Died: 4 March 1842 (aged 48); Paris, France
- Occupation: Lawyer
- Known for: Minister of Public Education

Narcisse Parant (5 February 1794 – 4 March 1842) was a French lawyer who was briefly Minister of Public Education in 1839.

== Early years ==
Narcisse Parant was born in Metz, Moselle, on 5 February 1794. His parents were Nicolas Parant, apothecary, and his wife Marie Peltre. Under the Bourbon Restoration (1814–1830) he was a successful advocate in Metz. He held liberal views.

== July Monarchy ==
Parant supported the July Revolution of 1830. In 1830 he was appointed attorney general of the Court of Metz, and on 17 April became attorney general of Bourges. He was elected a deputy of Moselle (Metz) on 5 July 1831. He became advocate-general at the Court of Cassation on 16 August 1832. He had to run for reelection on 29 September 1832, winning by a margin of 175 votes to 89.

Parant was reelected on 21 June 1834. On 21 May 1837 he was made Sub-secretary of State for Justice. He was reelected on 2 March 1839 and reappointed to the Court of Cassation on 12 March 1839. He was appointed Minister of Public Education on 31 March 1839, holding office until 12 May 1839. After leaving office he became Counselor of the Court of Cassation.

Parant was made a Knight of the Legion of Honor of 25 January 1832 and an officer on 6 May 1838. He died on 4 March 1842 in Paris, aged 48.

== Works ==
- Tableau des villes, bourgs, villages de la Moselle (1825);
- Loi de la presse en 1836, ou Législation actuelle sur l'imprimerie et la librairie (1836)
