= Michel Hébert =

French lawyer and politician (1799–1887)

- Born: 7 July 1799; Granville, France
- Died: 19 April 1887 (aged 87); Asnières, Eure, France
- Occupations: Lawyer, politician
- Known for: Minister of Justice and Religious Affairs

Michel Pierre Alexis Hébert (7 July 1799 – 19 April 1887) was a French lawyer, a deputy to the National Assembly from 1834 to 1848 and a Minister of Justice and Religious Affairs during the last year of the July Monarchy.

== Early years ==
Michel Pierre Alexis Hébert was born in Granville, Manche, on 7 July 1799. He studied law, and was admitted to the bar of Rouen in 1820. He had some success as an advocate. After the July Revolution of 1830 he supported the new government and was rapidly promoted in the judiciary. He was appointed prosecutor at the court of Rouen in 1833. On 19 May 1834 he was made head of the royal court of Metz.

== Political career ==
On 21 June 1834 Hébert was elected deputy for the sixth college of Eure (Pont-Audemer). He sat with the conservative majority, and was soon a frequent speaker. He was involved in debates on tobacco, bankruptcies, assizes and secret ballots for jury decisions. On 19 September 1836 he was made Advocate General at the Court of Cassation. He was reelected on 31 October 1836 and 4 November 1837. He opposed French intervention in Spain, and was involved in various debates relating to legal issues. Hébert joined the coalition opposed to the cabinet of Louis-Mathieu Molé.

Hébert was reelected on 2 March 1839. On 16 October 1841 he was appointed Attorney General at the Court of Paris. In the Chamber he spoke strongly in favor of the monarchy. He was reelected on 9 July 1842. On 1 May 1843 he was made Commander of the Legion of Honor. On 14 March 1847 he was appointed Minister of Justice and Religious Affairs. He supported François Guizot in his resistance to any reform.

== Last years ==
A few days after the republic was proclaimed during the February Revolution of 1848 Hébert fled France for England to avoid an arrest warrant. However the case was dismissed and Hébert returned to Paris. He practiced at the bar until 1854, when he retired from public life. He died in the Château de Saint-Gervais d'Asnières, in Asnières, Eure, on 19 April 1887 at the age of 87.
