= Narcisse-Achille de Salvandy =

French politician (1795–1856)

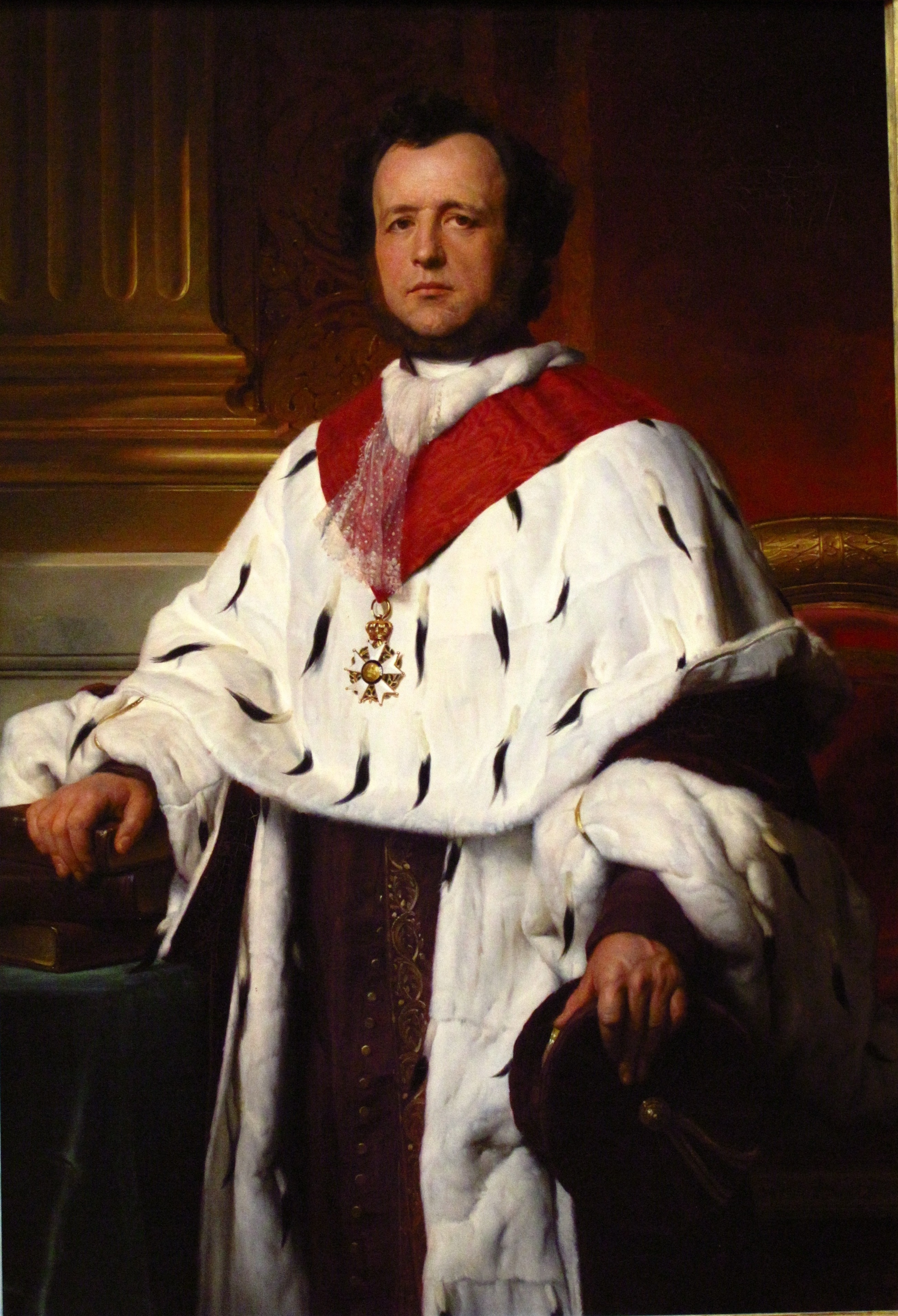
Narcisse-Achille de Salvandy

Narcisse-Achille, comte de Salvandy (French pronunciation: [naʁsis aʃil də salvɑ̃di]; 11 June 1795 – 16 December 1856) was a French politician.

He was born at Condom, Gers of a poor family of Irish extraction. He joined the army in 1813, and in the following year joined the household troops of the newly restored king Louis XVIII. His patriotic pamphlet on La Coalition et la France (1816) attracted the attention of Elie, Comte Decazes, who employed him to disseminate his views in the press, and he waged war against the Jean-Baptiste, Comte de Villèle ministry of 1822–1828.

Under the July monarchy he sat almost continuously in the Chamber of Deputies from 1830 until 1848, remaining steadfast to his Moderate Liberal principles. Minister of education in Louis-Mathieu Molé's cabinet of 1837–1839, and again in 1845, he superintended the reconstitution of the Council of Education, the foundation of the French School at Athens and the restoration of the École des Chartes.

For short periods in 1841 and 1843 he was ambassador at Madrid and at Turin, and became a member of the Académie française, the twelfth occupant of seat 1, in 1835. Under the Second French Empire he took no part in public affairs, and died at Graveron (Eure).
