= Adrien de Gasparin =

French statesman and agriculturist

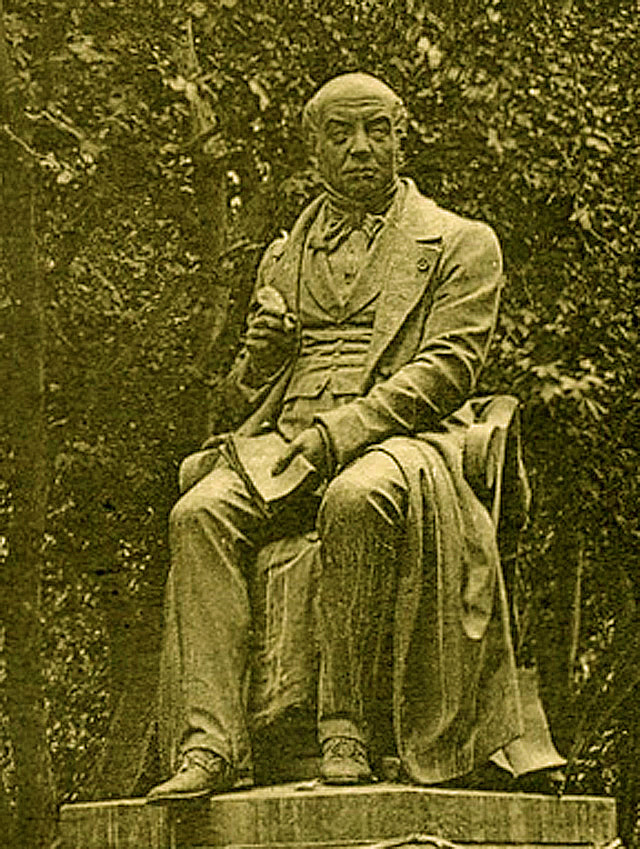

Adrien Étienne Pierre, comte de Gasparin (June 29, 1783 in Orange, Vaucluse – September 7, 1862 in Orange, Vaucluse) was a French statesman and agriculturist.

== Biography ==
He was in the army but retired after being wounded in 1806. After the revolution of 1830 he was made successively prefect of the departments of Loire and Isère, and in 1831 of Rhône. For his promptness in suppressing an insurrection at Lyons in 1834, he was raised to the peerage. He became minister of the interior in 1836, and gave his attention especially to prison reforms and the establishment of hospitals. He occupied the same position in the short-lived cabinet of March 1839. In 1848 he accepted the management of the national agricultural institute at Versailles. The institute was abolished in 1852.

== Literary works ==
He published a large number of papers and several extended works on agricultural subjects, the principal of which is Cours d'agriculture (5 vols., Paris, 1843–49).

== Family ==
His father Thomas-Augustin de Gasparin was a military officer in the French Revolutionary army and a member of the Committee of Public Safety. His son Agénor de Gasparin was a noted politician and author, who emigrated to Geneva.

Preceded by Marthe Camille Bachasson, comte de Montalivet	French Minister of the Interior; 1836–1837	Succeeded by Marthe Camille Bachasson, comte de Montalivet
Preceded by Marthe Camille Bachasson, comte de Montalivet	French Minister of the Interior; 1839–1839	Succeeded by Charles Marie Tanneguy Duchâtel
