= Laurent Cunin-Gridaine =

French politician

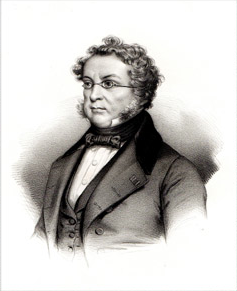
- Born: Laurent Cunin; 10 July 1778; Sedan, Ardennes, France
- Died: 19 April 1859 (aged 80); Sedan, Ardennes, France
- Occupation(s): Businessman, politician
- Known for: Minister of Agriculture and Commerce

Laurent Cunin-Gridaine (10 July 1778 – 19 April 1859) was a French businessman and politician. He was a deputy from 1827 to 1848, and Minister of Agriculture and Commerce from 1839 to 1848, with one short interruption.

== Early years ==
Laurent Cunin-Gridaine was born in Sedan, Ardennes, on 10 July 1778. He started work for M. Gridaine, a clothier in Sedan, as a workman. His employer recognized his intelligence and took him as his associate, and then as his son. He became wealthy, and was elected a municipal councilor in Sedan.

On 17 November 1827 Cunin-Gridaine ran successfully for election as deputy in the first electoral district of the Ardennes (Mézières). He joined the constitutionalist opposition, spoke in favor of press freedom and was a signatory of the Address of the 221. He was reelected on 12 July 1830.

== July monarchy ==
Cunin-Gridaine was a strong supporter of the government after the July Revolution of 1830. He was named to the general council of the Ardennes and was appointed president of the commercial court of Sedan. He was reelected as deputy on 5 July 1831, 21 June 1834, 4 November 1837 and 2 March 1839. In 1834 he transferred management of his company to his two sons.

On 12 May 1837 he was named Minister of Commerce in the ministry of Jean-de-Dieu Soult, holding office until the cabinet fell on 29 February 1840. He returned as Minister of Commerce on 29 October 1840 in the new Guizot cabinet, remaining in office until the February Revolution of 1848 overthrew the monarchy. During his ministry he organized the Industrial Exhibition of 1844.

== Last years ==
Cunin-Gridaine returned to private life after the February Revolution.

He was a member of the international jury of the Exposition Universelle (1855). He became a Knight of the Legion of Honor in 1828, an officer in 1833 and a Grand Officer on 29 October 1843.

Cunin-Gridaine died in Sedan on 19 April 1859.

== Sources ==
- Robert, Adolphe; Cougny, Gaston (1889). "CUNIN-GRIDAINE (Laurent)". Dictionnaire des parlementaires français de 1789 à 1889. National Assembly of France.
