= Tanneguy Duchâtel =

French politician (1803–1867)

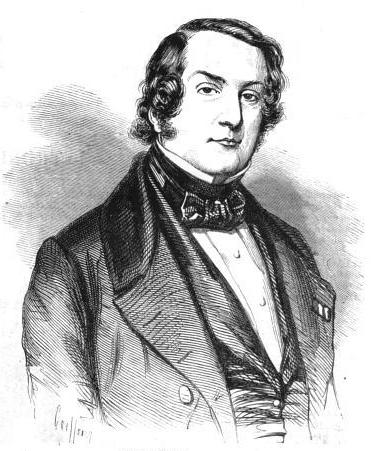
Tanneguy Duchâtel (1849)

Count Charles Marie Tanneguy Duchâtel (19 February 1803, Paris – 5 November 1867, Paris) was a French politician. He was Minister of the Interior in the Cabinet of François-Pierre Guizot (19 September 1847 to 24 February 1848), losing office in the February Revolution.

== Sources ==
- Alfred-Auguste Cuvillier-Fleury, Le Comte Tanneguy Duchatel. Notice Historique, Paris, J. Claye, 1868
- Georges Picot, Le comte Duchâtel : notice historique, lue en séance publique le 12 décembre 1908 à l'Institut de France, Librairie Hachette, Paris, 1909 (read online)
- Notice biographique de Tanneguy Duchâtel, extrait de l'ouvrage Les ministres des Finances de la Révolution française au Second Empire, Comité pour l'histoire économique et financière de la France, 2007, 624 p, (ISBN 978-2-11-094807-6).
- Notice biographique sur le site de l'Assemblée nationale
- "Tanneguy Duchâtel", in Adolphe Robert and Gaston Cougny, Dictionnaire des parlementaires français (1789–1891), Bourloton, Paris, 1889 Edition details Wikisource
