= Legislative elections in France =

Legislative elections in France (French: élections législatives en France), or general elections (French: élections générales) per the Constitution's wording, determine who becomes Members of Parliament, each with the right to sit in the National Assembly, which is the lower house of the French Parliament.

== Legislative elections under the Fifth Republic ==
=== Constituencies ===
The total number of constituencies has varied since 1958 but since the 1986 electoral reform re-establishing the two-round system for legislative elections, the total number of constituencies is 577. The last electoral boundaries readjustment dates back to 2010.

Out of the 577 existing constituencies, there are:

- 539 constituencies in metropolitan France;
- 27 constituencies in the Overseas;
- 11 constituencies for French people living abroad.

Moreover, the French Constitution sets the maximum number of MPs at 577.

=== Timing ===
MPs are elected for a five-year-term.

Following the reduction of the presidential term's length from 7 to 5 years after the 2000 referendum, a 2001 organic law has set the expiration of the outgoing National Assembly's powers on the third Tuesday of June of the fifth year following the last general election. The government sets the election dates by decree.

Legislative elections need to be held during the 60-day period preceding the expiration of the outgoing Assembly's powers. Therefore, legislative elections are usually held in June, some weeks after the presidential election. Until the electoral calendar reform of 2001, legislative elections, apart from early elections, were usually held in March.

Besides, per the French Constitution (article 12), the President has the power to dissolve the National Assembly after consulting with the Prime minister and the heads of the lower and upper houses of Parliament. The Constitution does not set limits on that power apart from prohibiting another dissolution from occurring less than a year after the last one. General elections have to be held necessarily from 20 to 40 days after the Assembly has been formally dissolved.

A snap legislative election, held on 30 June and 7 July 2024, was called on 9 June by President Emmanuel Macron in the aftermath of the European Parliament elections. It was the first snap election since 1997 when President Jacques Chirac dissolved the National Assembly a year early.

=== Electoral system ===
Along with the establishment of the Fifth Republic, the two-round system (TRS) was established as the country's voting system for legislative/general elections in 1958.

MPs are elected in single-member constituencies. A candidate who receives an absolute majority of valid votes and a vote total greater than 25% of the registered electorate is elected in the first round. If no candidate reaches this threshold, a runoff election is held between the top two candidates plus any other candidate who received a vote total greater than 12.5% of registered voters. The candidate who receives the most votes in the second round is elected.

Since then, every legislative election, apart from the 1986 list-PR election, used TRS.

== List of general elections in French history ==
=== Kingdom of France & First Republic ===
Extreme Left / Montagnards / Jacobin / The Plain / Girondins / Thermidorians / Independent / Feuillant / Clichy Club / Ultra Royalists
1791	136 / 345 / 264
1792	200 / 389 / 160
1795	63 / 54 / 33
1797	28 / 44 / 105
1798	106 / 44
1799	30 / 240 / 150 / 80

=== Bourbon Restoration & July Monarchy ===
Jacobin Republicans / Miscellaneous left / Republicans / Liberals / Movement Party / Third Party / Doctrinaires / Resistance Party / Orléanist / Bonapartists / Ultra Royalists / Legitimists
May 1815	40 / 510 / 80
August 1815	50 / 350
1816	20 / 10 / 136 / 92
1820	80 / 194 / 160
1824	17 / 413
1827	170 / 260
1830	274 / 282
1831	73 / 282 / 104
1834	75 / 50 / 320 / 15
1837	19 / 142 / 56 / 64 / 168 / 15
1839	240 / 199 / 20
1842	193 / 266
1846	168 / 290

=== 1848 Provisional Government & Second Republic ===
The Mountain / Republicans / Party of Order
1848	80 / 600 / 200
1849	180 / 75 / 450

=== Second Empire ===
Republicans / Bonapartists / Legitimists
1852	3 / 253 / 7
1857	7 / 276
1863	17 / 251 / 15
1869	30 / 212 / 41

=== Third Republic ===
PUP / PCF / SFIO / Far-Left / Radicals and Socialists / Radical Socialists / Republican Union / SI / PRS / Radical Left / Independent Radicals / Radical-Socialists / Centre-Left / Republican Left / Democratic Union / ARD / Miscellaneous / SE / PDP / Progressive Republicans / Constitutional monarchists / Centre-Right / Bonapartists / Orléanist / FR / Clericals / Legitimists / Monarchists / Right / Nationalists / Far-Right
1871	38 / 112 / 72 / 20 / 214 / 182
1876	27 / 98 / 193 / 48 / 15 / 22 / 76 / 40 / 15 / 24
1877	27 / 73 / 147 / 66 / 3 / 111 / 38 / 56
1881	48 / 1 / 47 / 170 / 157 / 44 / 8 / 44 / 38
1885	60 / 40 / 200 / 83 / 65 / 63 / 73
1889	57 / 13 / 69 / 214 / 14 / 3 / 169 / 37
1893	67 / 41 / 99 / 242 / 30 / 27 / 61 / 14
1898	97 / 55 / 86 / 232 / 5 / 53 / 39 / 14
1902	43 / 104 / 129 / 62 / 127 / 89 / 35
1906	54 / 20 / 132 / 115 / 90 / 66 / 78 / 30
1910	75 / 24 / 261 / 1 / 66 / 30 / 131 / 7
1914	5 / 102 / 22 / 192 / 66 / 77 / 50 / 88
1919	68 / 26 / 86 / 107 / 21 / 29 / 183
1924	26 / 104 / 44 / 139 / 123 / 29 / 116
1928	11 / 102 / 60 / 125 / 180 / 24 / 100
1932	9 / 10 / 132 / 43 / 160 / 121 / 49 / 83
1936	6 / 72 / 149 / 44 / 115 / 82 / 42 / 100

=== Provisional Government of the French Republic & Fourth Republic ===
PCF / SFIO / PRRRS / PR / Miscellaneous / RGR / MRP / CNIP / PRL / RPF / CNRS / UNR / UFF
1945	159 / 146 / 60 / 6 / 151 / 64
June 1946	151 / 127 / 31 / 9 / 166 / 61
November 1946	182 / 102 / 69 / 29 / 173 / 72
1951	103 / 107 / 90 / 95 / 96 / 121 / 13
1956	150 / 95 / 77 / 14 / 7 / 83 / 95 / 22 / 52

=== Fifth Republic ===
Election	President	Electoral system	Winning party/coalition	Government vote share (1st round)	Seat majority	Turnout
1958	René Coty (Note: Coty was the last President of the Fourth Republic. Nonetheless, thanks to transitory constitutional provisions, he remained in office until handing over to his successor in January 1959.) (1954–1959)	Two-round system	UNR-CNIP-MRP and allies	43.1%	402 / 576 (70%)	77.2% (1st round); 76.3% (2nd round)
1962 (Note: Snap election)	Charles de Gaulle (1959–1969)	Two-round system	UNR/UDT-RI	38.9%	268 / 482 (56%)	68.7% (1st round); 72% (2nd round)
1967	Charles de Gaulle (1959–1969)	Two-round system	UDR-FNRI-DVD	37.8%	259 / 487 (53%)	80.9% (1st round); 79.7% (2nd round)
1968	Charles de Gaulle (1959–1969)	Two-round system	UDR-FNRI-DVD	47.8%	367 / 487 (75%)	80% (1st round); 77.8% (2nd round)
1973	Georges Pompidou (1969–1974)	Two-round system	UDR-MR-FNRI-CDP-DVD	41.2%	302 / 490 (62%)	81.2% (1st round); 81.9% (2nd round)
1978	Valéry Giscard d'Estaing (1974–1981)	Two-round system	RPR-UDF	46.5%	277 / 491 (56%)	82.8% (1st round); 84.7% (2nd round)
1981	François Mitterrand (1981–1995)	Two-round system	PS-PCF-MRG-DVG	54.4%	329 / 491 (67%)	70.7% (1st round); 74.5% (2nd round)
1986	François Mitterrand (1981–1995)	List-PR	RPR-UDF-DVD (Note: Cohabitation)	44.8%	290 / 577 (50%)	78.5%
1988	François Mitterrand (1981–1995)	Two-round system	PS-MRG-DVG (minority government) (Note: Hung parliament)	37.5%	275 / 577 (48%)	65.7% (1st round); 69.9% (2nd round)
1993	François Mitterrand (1981–1995)	Two-round system	Union for France	42.9%	472 / 577 (82%)	68.9% (1st round); 67.6% (2nd round)
1997	Jacques Chirac (1995–2007)	Two-round system	Plural Left	43.1%	319 / 577 (55%)	67.9% (1st round); 71.1% (2nd round)
2002	Jacques Chirac (1995–2007)	Two-round system	Union for the Presidential Majority	43.4%	389 / 577 (67%)	64.4% (1st round); 60.3% (2nd round)
2007	Nicolas Sarkozy (2007–2012)	Two-round system	UMP-NC-MPF-DVD	45.6%	343 / 577 (59%)	60.4% (1st round); 60% (2nd round)
2012	François Hollande (2012–2017)	Two-round system	PS-PRG-EELV-DVG	39.9%	328 / 577 (57%)	57.2% (1st round); 55.4% (2nd round)
2017	Emmanuel Macron (2017–present)	Two-round system	LREM-MoDem-PRG	32.3%	351 / 577 (61%)	48.7% (1st round); 42.6% (2nd round)
2022	Emmanuel Macron (2017–present)	Two-round system	Ensemble (minority government)	25.8%	251 / 577 (44%)	47.5% (1st round); 46.2% (2nd round)
2024	Emmanuel Macron (2017–present)	Two-round system	Ensemble-LR (minority coalition government) (Note: Although neither Ensemble or LR won the election per se, since RN won the popular vote and the NFP won the most seats, Ensemble and LR subsequently formed a government thanks to a coalition deal giving them the largest combined number of seats in the Assembly.)	31.5% (Note: That figure reflects the combined share of the popular vote for Ensemble, LR, miscellaneous right and centre candidates who ran on separate platforms in the election before entering a coalition agreement to form the next government.)	212 / 577 (37%)	66.7% (1st round); 66.6% (2nd round)

PCF / LFI / PSU / G.s / FGDS / The Greens / EELV / PE / SFIO / PS / PRG / TDP / PRRRS / RP / Miscellaneous / Vacant / REN / CD / UDF / MoDem / Horizons / LC / UDI / UDR / RPR / RI / UMP / LR / UDX / RN
1958	10 / 40 / 37 / 1 / 57 / 132 / 189
1962	41 / 2 / 65 / 44 / 6 / 36 / 233 / 28 / 27
1967	73 / 4 / 117 / 9 / 41 / 243
1968	34 / 57 / 9 / 33 / 354
1973	73 / 1 / 102 / 12 / 30 / 272
1978	86 / 104 / 10 / 17 / 121 / 150
1981	44 / 283 / 17 / 62 / 85
1986	35 / 206 / 2 / 23 / 127 / 149 / 35
1988	27 / 260 / 9 / 23 / 2 / 129 / 126 / 1
1993	24 / 53 / 50 / 207 / 242 / 1
1997	35 / 7 / 255 / 12 / 16 / 112 / 139 / 1
2002	21 / 3 / 140 / 7 / 20 / 29 / 357
2007	15 / 4 / 186 / 7 / 27 / 3 / 22 / 313
2012	7 / 17 / 280 / 12 / 6 / 45 / 2 / 12 / 194 / 2
2017	10 / 17 / 1 / 30 / 3 / 28 / 308 / 42 / 18 / 112 / 8
2022	12 / 72 / 4 / 21 / 26 / 1 / 3 / 60 / 150 / 48 / 27 / 3 / 61 / 89
2024	9 / 74 / 6 / 28 / 59 / 2 / 51 / 102 / 33 / 26 / 5 / 39 / 17 / 126

== See also ==
- Elections in France
