= Jean-Baptiste Etcheverry =

French politician (1805–1874)

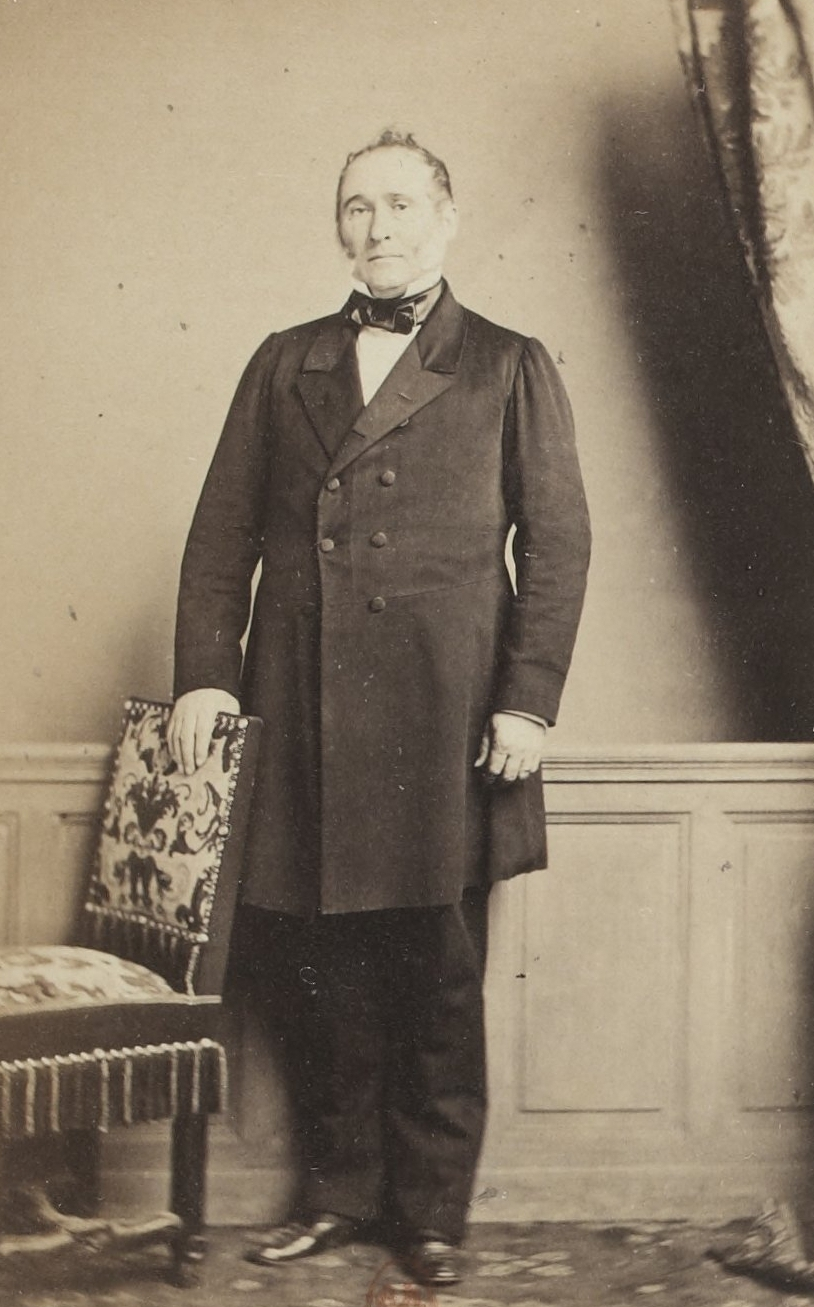

deputy to the Corps législatif
- In office 1852–1869

Personal details
- Born: 4 November 1805 Saint-Étienne-de-Baïgorry, Basses-Pyrénées
- Died: 4 March 1874 (aged 68) Paris

Jean-Baptiste Etcheverry (4 November 1805, Saint-Étienne-de-Baïgorry, Basses-Pyrénées – 4 March 1874, Paris), was a French politician.

The son of Thomas Etcheverry and a brother of Jean-Amédée Etcheverry, he was already the general councillor of Basses-Pyrénées when he was elected as a deputy to the 1st Corps législatif in Basses-Pyrénées's 3rd constituency on 29 February 1852, with 23,984 votes against 2,466 for Augustin Chaho.

In the house, he voted for the re-establishment of the Empire and agreed with all opinions of the majority.

He was successively reelected on 22 June 1857 and 1 June 1863, with large proportions of votes.

He retired from political life in 1869.

The cartoonist A-10 Etcheverry is his grandson.

== Bibliography ==
- "Jean-Baptiste Etcheverry", in Adolphe Robert and Gaston Cougny, Dictionnaire des parlementaires français (1789–1891), Bourloton, Paris, 1889 Edition details Wikisource
