= Solidarité républicaine =

French political society founded in 1848

The Solidarité républicaine, association pour le développement des droits et des intérêts de la démocratie, in English, the "Republican Solidarity, an Association for the Development of the Rights and the Interests of Democracy", was a political society that existed during the Second French Republic, particularly active following the Springtime of the peoples.

== History ==
In November 1848, the Solidarité républicaine was founded in Paris by, most notably, Alexandre Ledru-Rollin, Louis Charles Delescluze, Charels Ferdinand Gambon, and Germain Sarrut for electoral support for Ledru-Rollin in the French presidential election of 1848. Grouping future deputies of The Mountain party and the directors of republican journals and local organizations, it was administered by a general council of 70 members, along with a president Martin Bernard, vice-president Agricol Perdiguier, and secretary general Louis Charles Delescluze. Bernard Mulé was treasurer and engineer, with Léon Tremplier as his vice-treasurer. Charles Dain was also a prominent figure follower of Charles Fourier.

The association aimed to centralize the committee of Paris and the committees of the various departments, buroughs, and towns across France, it saw to consolidate supporters of democracy and assure republican propaganda in election campaigns rather than control campaigns like the Party of Order conservatives.

The association headquarters were at 50 Rue du Faubourg-Saint-Denis. Nearby to its main competitor, the Democratic Association of the Friends of the Constitution, founded in the same month by moderate republicans.

The Solidarité républicaine functioned as an earlier form of the Mountain, collecting various radical republican voices during the initial chaos of the Springtime of the peoples. The Court of Cassation declared the association to be illegal, as it was a secret society, by an order from the second republic on the 13th of June, 1848.

During the legislative elections of 1849, the democratic socialists, who were republican radicals and socialists in line with the Solidarité Républicaine, received 180 deputy seats, and Martin Bernard was reëlected. Ultimately it was replaced by the Mountain, itself disbanded in the Coup of 18 Brumaire.
