= Corps législatif =

Legislative body in Napoleonic France

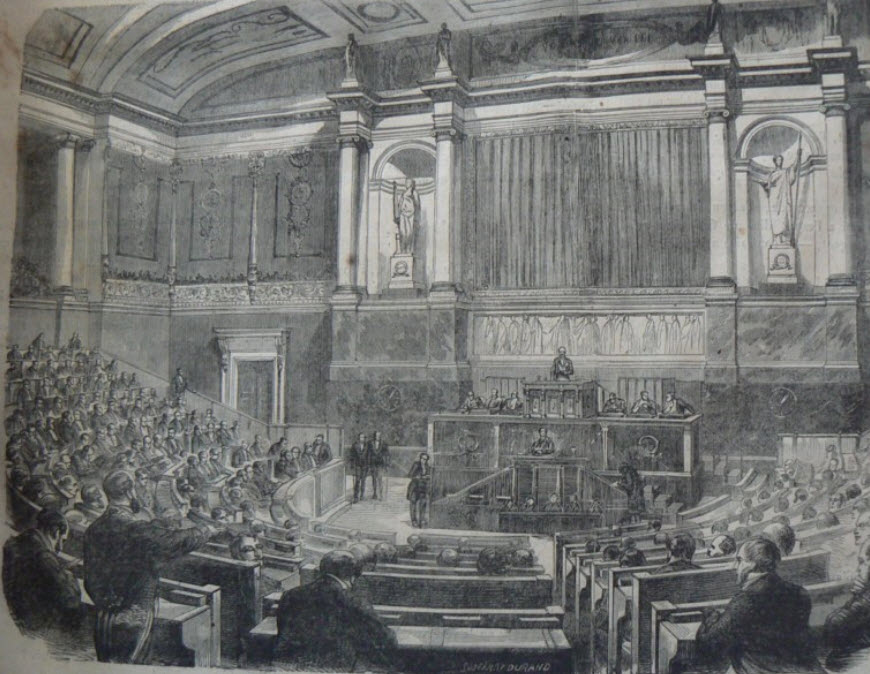
The meeting chamber of the corps législatif, published in Le Journal illustré, 1869.

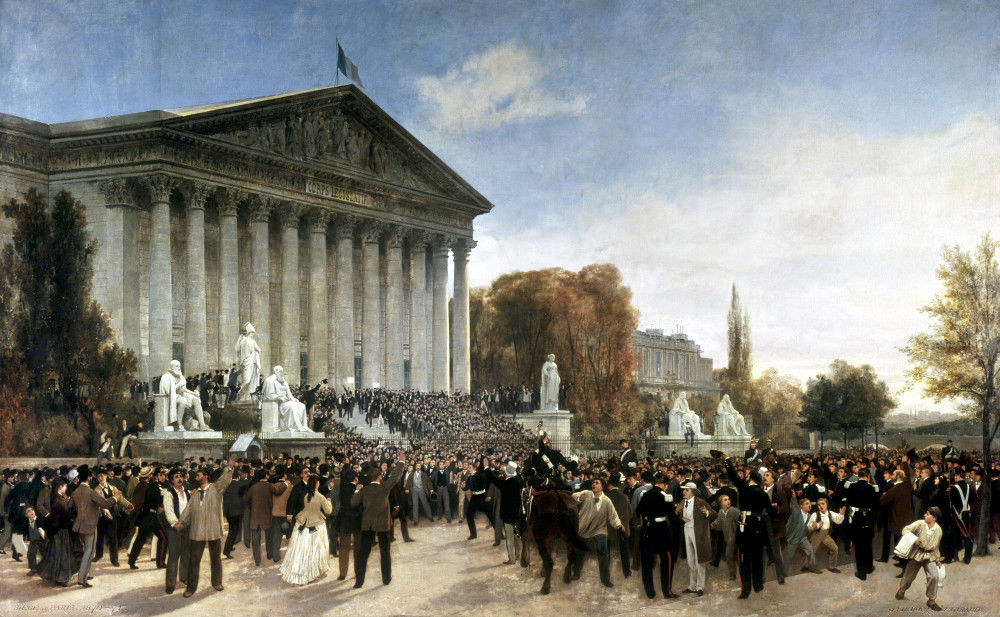
The scene outside the Palais du Corps Législatif after its final sitting, 1870, by Jacques Guiaud.

The Corps législatif was a part of the French legislature during the French Revolution and beyond. It is also the generic French term used to refer to any legislative body.

== History ==
Under Napoleon's Consulate, the Constitution of the Year VIII (1799) set up a Corps législatif as the law-making body of the three-part government apparatus (alongside the Tribunat and the Sénat conservateur). This body replaced the Council of Five Hundred, established by the Constitution of the Year III of the Directory period as the lower house of the French legislature, but its role consisted solely of voting on laws deliberated before the Tribunat. The Constitution of the Year X continued the corps' existence, but Napoleon grew more impatient with its slow deliberations and stripped it of much of its power in 1804. It was finally abolished by Louis XVIII on 4 June 1814, to be replaced by the Chambre des députés (though a Chambre des représentants was briefly set up during the Hundred Days).

When Napoleon III gained power, he re-constituted the Corps as France's lower chamber through the Constitution of 1852, with members elected by direct universal suffrage for terms of 6 years. The elections occurred in February 1852, June 1857, 31 May 1863 and May 1869. The elected corps législatif of the Second Empire shared its legislative powers with the executive Conseil d'État, made up of functionaries, and the Sénat, whose members were named for life.

It was replaced by the Chamber of Deputies in the Third Republic.

== Historical composition ==
=== Second French Empire (1852–1870) ===
Republicans / Bonapartists / Legitimists
1852	3 / 253 / 7
1857	7 / 276
1863	17 / 251 / 15
1869	30 / 212 / 41

== See also ==
- A corps législatif also existed in the Republic of Frankfurt.
