= 1848 elections =

1848 election may refer to:

- 1848 French presidential election
- 1848 French Constituent Assembly election
- 1848 United States presidential election
- 1848 United States House of Representatives elections
