= 1849 French legislative election in Réunion =

Elections to the French National Assembly were held in Réunion on 30 September 1849 as part of the wider French elections, with a second round on 21 October. The territory elected two seats, with voters able to cast two votes. The seats were won by Charles Ogé Barbaroux and Jean-Baptiste de Greslan.

== Results ==
Candidate	First round		Second round	
Candidate	Votes	%	Votes	%
Jean-Baptiste de Greslan	3,340	32.31	5,297	33.84
Charles Ogé Barbaroux	3,212	31.08	5,398	34.49
Sully Brunet	2,739	26.50	3,911	24.99
Charles Fery d'Esclands	1,045	10.11		
Timagène Houat			1,045	6.68
Total	10,336	100.00	15,651	100.00
Total votes	6,405	–	9,186	–
Registered voters/turnout	36,723	17.44	34,810	26.39
Source: Compte-rendu des séances de l'Assemblée nationale
