= Édouard de Thouvenel =

French politician (1818–1866)

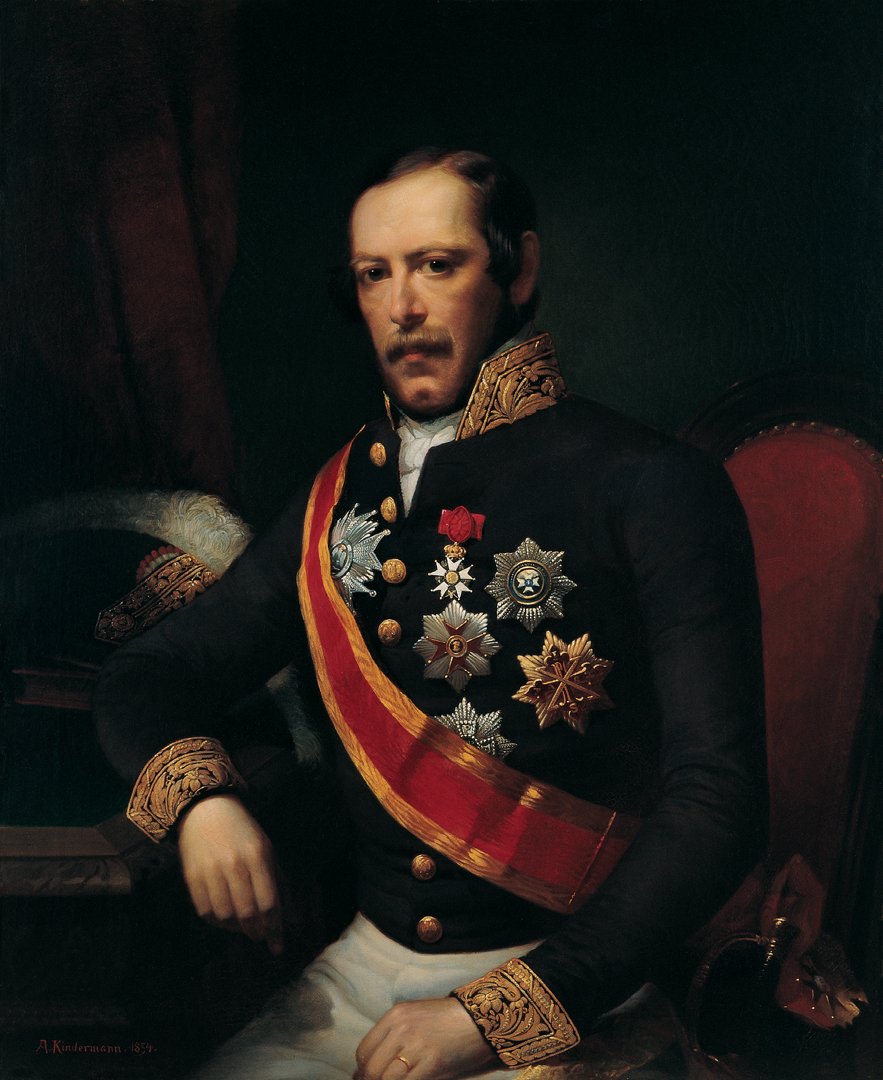
Édouard Thouvenel (1818-1866).

Édouard Antoine de Thouvenel (French pronunciation: [edwaʁ də tuvnɛl]; 11 November 1818, Verdun, Meuse – 18 October 1866) was ambassador to the Ottoman Empire from 1855 to 1860, and French Minister of Foreign Affairs from 1860 to 1862.

== Career ==
After studying law and travelling throughout Europe, in 1840 Thouvenel published an account of his travels which first appeared in the Revue des Deux Mondes (la Hongrie et la Valachie. Souvenirs de voyages et notices historiques). He entered the foreign service in 1841 with the help of his sister. She was married to Alfred-August Cuvillier-Fleury, the former preceptor of Henri d'Orléans, Duke of Aumale. Thouvenel was appointed attaché to the French embassy in Brussels in 1844, followed by Athens in 1845. He became Chargé d'affaires in Athens in 1848 and afterwards became Minister Plenipotentiary to the Kingdom of Bavaria. In July 1850 he was made a Commandeur of the Legion of Honour, followed by Grand Officier (January 10 1854), and finally Grand Cross (14 January 1860).

After the overthrow of the French Second Republic and the establishment of the French Second Empire under Louis-Napoléon, Thouvenel was recalled to Paris and put in charge of political affairs at the Ministry of Foreign Affairs. In 1855 he was appointed French ambassador to the Ottoman Empire in Constantinople, remaining in the post until 1860. He was elected to the French Senate in 1859.

=== Minister of Foreign Affairs ===
As Minister of Foreign Affairs during the French Second Empire, Thouvenel negotiated key treaties on behalf of France. In 1860, he negotiated the Treaty of Turin (1860), which annexed the Kingdom of Sardinia and the Duchy of Savoy to France, as well as a free-trade agreement between France and Britain. He was French plenipotentiary in the negotiations for a commercial treaty between France and Belgium, concluded on 1st May 1861. Thouvenel also arranged for a French intervention in Syria after a massacre of Christians took place there in 1860.

During the American Civil War, Thouvenel worked to impede Napoleon III's recognition of the Confederate States of America. He feared that such a move would antagonize the United States and cause a retaliatory US invasion of Mexico, where the French were conducting an expedition to install a monarchy.

His resignation in October 1862 was a result of clashes with the Emperor over the Roman Question. Thouvenel negotiated an agreement with the newly-formed Kingdom of Italy to withdraw French troops from Rome in exchange for a guarantee from the new Kingdom to respect the Pope's temporal hold of the city. This agreement had particularly displeased the Empress Eugénie.

=== Post-diplomacy ===
After resigning as Minister of Foreign Affairs, Thouvenel became president of the Compagnie des chemins de fer de l'Est. He was offered, but refused, the presidency of the Corps législatif after the death of the Duke of Morny left it vacant. In 1865 he was named "grand référendaire" of the Senate.

Political offices
Preceded by Jules Baroche	Minister of Foreign Affairs; 24 January 1860 – 15 October 1862	Succeeded by Édouard Drouyn de Lhuys
