= 1852 elections =

1852 election may refer to:

- 1852 French legislative election
- 1852 United Kingdom general election
- 1852 United States presidential election
- 1852 United States House of Representatives elections
