= 1857 French legislative election =

← 1852	28 February 1857 (first round); 5 March 1857 (second round)	1863 →
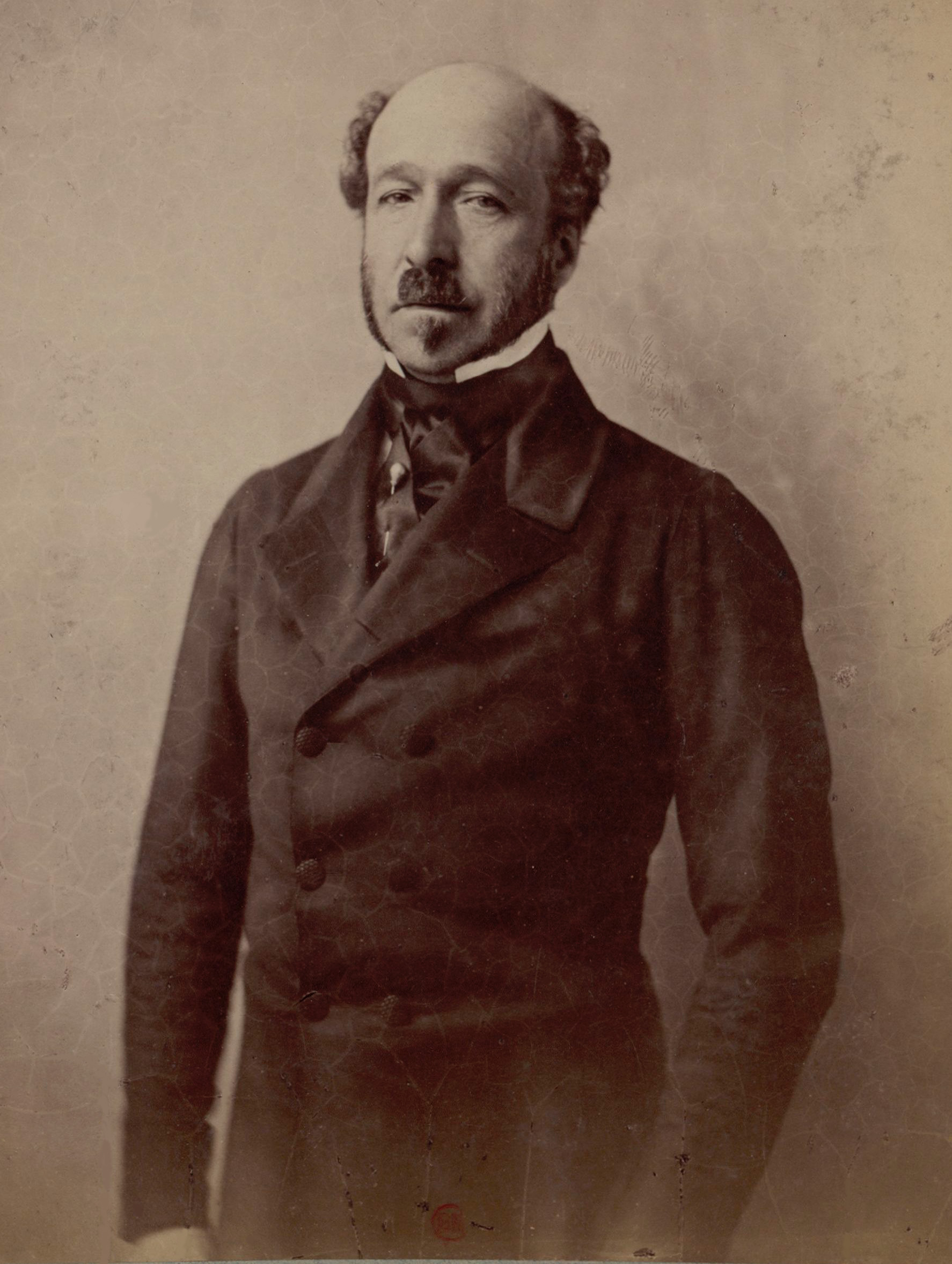

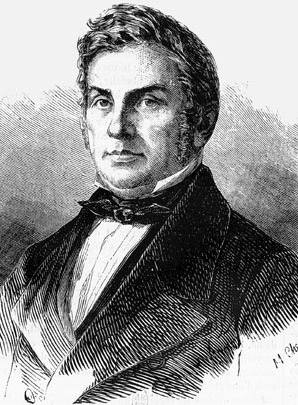
	First party	Second party
Leader	Charles de Morny	Michel Goudchaux
Party	Bonapartists	Republicans
Seats won	276	7
Popular vote	5,471,000	665,000
Percentage	89.16%	10.84%
Prime Minister before election
Jules Baroche
Bonapartist
Subsequent Prime Minister
Jules Baroche
Bonapartist

Parliamentary elections were held in France on 28 February 1857, with a second round on 5 March. According to the constitution of the empire, partisans of the regime ran as "official candidates" of the regime in often gerrymandered circonscriptions. As official candidates, their campaign expenditures were paid by the government and their campaigns were led by the local government.

== Results ==
Party	Votes	%	Seats
Bonapartists	5,471,000	89.16	276
Republicans	665,000	10.84	7
Total	6,136,000	100.00	283
Registered voters/turnout	9,490,206	–	
Source: Nohlen & Stöver, Kings and Presidents
