= 1799 French legislative election =

- 9–16 April 1799

One-third of the seats in the Council of Five Hundred and the Council of Elders
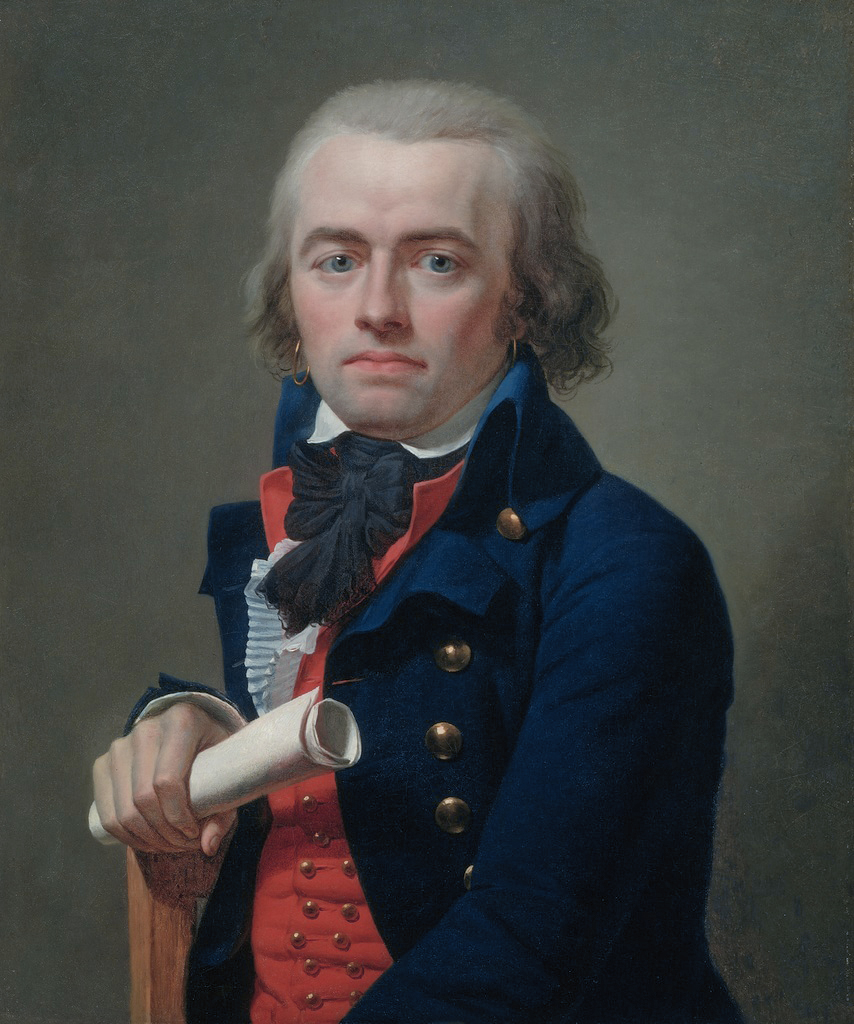

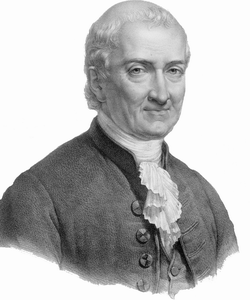

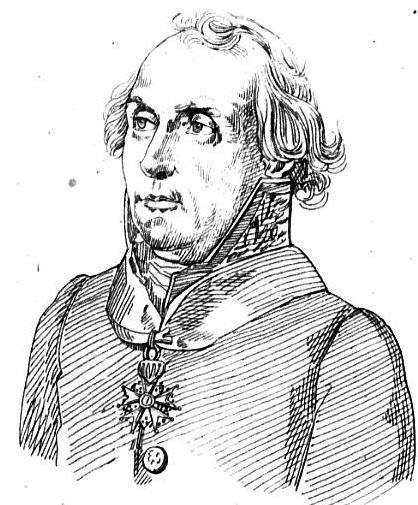
	First party	Second party
Leader	Jean Antoine Debry	François Barthélemy
Party	Montagnards	Directoriaux
Seats after	240	150
	Third party	Fourth party
Leader	Jean-Pierre Fabre
Party	Rightists	Far-left
Seats after	80	30
President of the Council of Five Hundred before election
Jean-Pierre Chazal
Clichy Club
Elected President of the Council of Five Hundred
Lucien Bonaparte

Legislative elections were held in France between 9 and 16 April 1799 to elect one-third of the members of the Council of Five Hundred and the Council of Ancients, the lower and upper houses of the legislature.

== Background ==
Following the Coup of 11 May 1798 (22 Floréal year VI in the Republican calendar), the small Jacobin minority led by Generals Jean-Antoine Marbot and Jean-Baptiste Jourdan harassed the Directory, with the occasional support of directorial deputies exasperated by the encroachments of the executive. The opposition to the Jacobins continued to grow with the deteriorating situation of the War of the Second Coalition. In Messidor they managed to form a small coalition government, forming a majority in the Council of the Five Hundred to refuse to allow the Directory to complete the court of cessation, even if the Council of Elders voted in their prerogative.

After the loss of Italy, the Minister of War, Barthélemy Louis Joseph Schérer, was accused of what would be considered corruption today and was brought before a commission of inquiry. It was on this occasion that Lucien Bonaparte asserted himself in the political scene as a leader of the opponents of the left, though not a devoted Jacobin.

In this context, the Directory did not dare to organize an election under the same pressure it had felt in the 1798 election. If the council was seen as promoting the election of candidates of the government, the policy of appeasement and peace could continue.

== Results ==
During the electoral processes, 27 departments experienced splits from the 25 in the 1798 election, and the assemblies were less troubled than the last election. Participation in the election however, fell to just 11.5% of the national vote, against 20% in 1798. For instance, in Alsace the turnout fell from 30% to just 15%. Of the 79 members supported by the government, 43 were beaten; this was also the case for the 39 of the 64 new official candidates for government. In addition, of the 44 candidates recommended by one or other directors, only six were elected.

Unlike in the 1798 elections, the Council validated majority assemblies in the departments that had experienced a split – except in Deux-Nèthes, where the elections were cancelled because the required turnout was not met. This "non-election" also occurred in Bouches-du-Rhône, where many irregularities were noted by the local assemblies.

The elections ended with a massive victory for the left-wing republican Montagnards. However, the Royalist parties, the Clichy Club (moderate constitutionalists) and Ultra-Royalists (absolute monarchists) won almost half of the seats within the council. The Extreme Left Group (Groupe de Extrême-Gauche) also won their first group of seats in the election.

The 1799 elections were the last parliamentary elections in France until May 1815.

Party	Seats
Party	Total
Montagnards	240
Directoriaux	150
Rightists	80
Far-left	30
Total	500
Source: Election-Politique
