= Jean-Pierre Chazal =

French politician

Jean-Pierre Chazal, (born 1 March 1766 at Pont-Saint-Esprit, died 23 April 1840 at Brussels) was a French politician of the revolutionary era.

Chazal was a lawyer at the parlement of Toulouse before the revolution, and was elected as a député to the National Convention for the département of Gard. He voted for the execution of Louis XVI, with a delay. After the Thermidorian Reaction he was a strong opponent of the Jacobins and was particularly hostile to Bertrand Barère. He served briefly on the Committee of Public Safety in 1795 and was a Représentant en mission to the départements of Aveyron, Cantal, Ardèche, Lozère, Haute-Loire and Puy de Dôme where his actions were noted for their moderation.

Elected to the Council of Five Hundred, he opposed the Clichy Union and supported the Directory during the Coup of 18 Fructidor. In 1797-8 he worked on a report about adoption and family law, and contributed further to the development of family law through the new Civil Code of 1803. He supported Napoleon during the Coup of 18 Brumaire and joined the commission which drafted the Constitution of the Year VIII. He also strongly opposed the proposal to reintroduce ground rents in 1800.

He was appointed to the Tribunat when it was set up, and on 14 September 1802, as préfet for the Hautes-Pyrénées where he remained until March 1813. Napoleon awarded him the Légion d'honneur on 23 July 1808 and made him Baron of the Empire on 13 August 1810.

He served as préfet for Hautes-Alpes from 12 March 1813 to 13 January 1814. During the Hundred Days he was also préfet of Finistère from 6 April to 14 July 1815. After the Bourbon restoration, his goods were seized and he was sent into exile. He went first to Vilvoorde and later set himself up in Brussels and went into business.

One of his children, Pierre Emmanuel Félix Chazal, took part in the Belgian Revolution, served as a general and became Belgian Minister of Defence.
