= Bonapartists (political party) =

Political party in France (1815–1889)

Bonapartists Bonapartistes
- Leader: Lucien Bonaparte; Napoléon-Jérôme Bonaparte
- Founder: Napoleon Bonaparte
- Founded: 1815; 211 years ago
- Dissolved: 1889; 137 years ago
- Ideology: Majority: • Anti-monarchism (1815); • Bonapartism (1852–1870); • Bonapartist Restoration (1870–1889); Factions: • Liberalism (1815, 1852–1870); • Jacobinism (1815); • Conservatism (1852–1870); • Imperial Restoration (1880–1889)
- Political position: Majority: • Big tent; • Centre-left (1815); • Centre (1852–1870); • Centre-right (1870–1889); Factions: • Left-wing (1815); • Right-wing (1852–1889); • Far-right (1880–1889)
- Colours: Violet

The Bonapartist Party, typically shortened to just the Bonapartists, was the name given to a political party that took part to the May 1815 French legislative election but was disbanded following the Second Bourbon Restoration. Following the 1851 French coup d'état led by soon to be Napoleon III, the party was reformed and participated in four elections until being reduced to a minor party after the fall of Napoleon III in 1870. The party became once again a major contender during the 1876 election, and remained a major contender until the 1885 election. Following the 1885 election, the party was merged into the Conservative Rally alliance in 1889 when it was finally disbanded.

== Origins ==
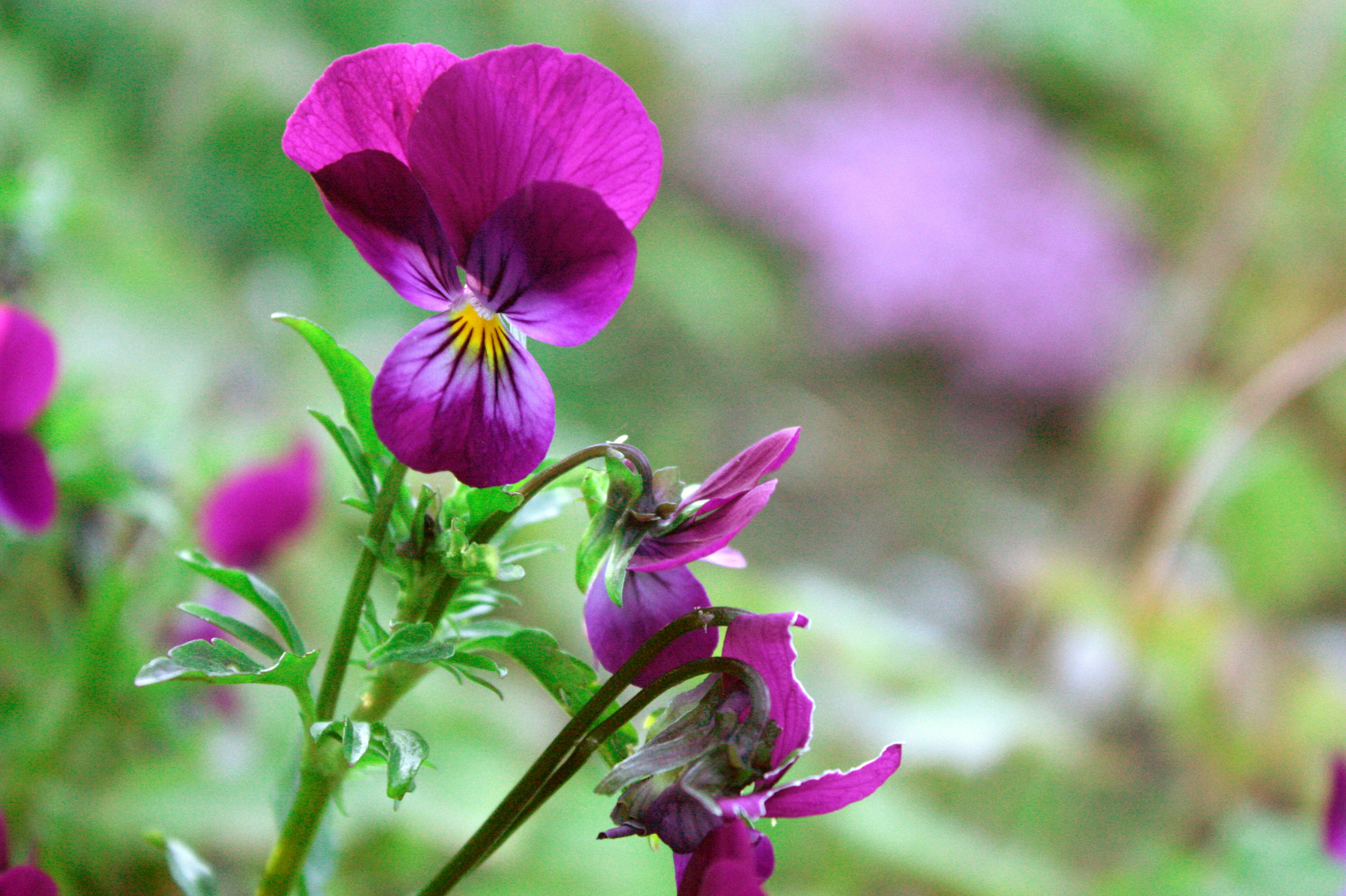
During his exile to Elba from 1814 to 1815, Napoleon Bonaparte announced he would return in the spring. The violet became a symbol of this and of Bonapartism.

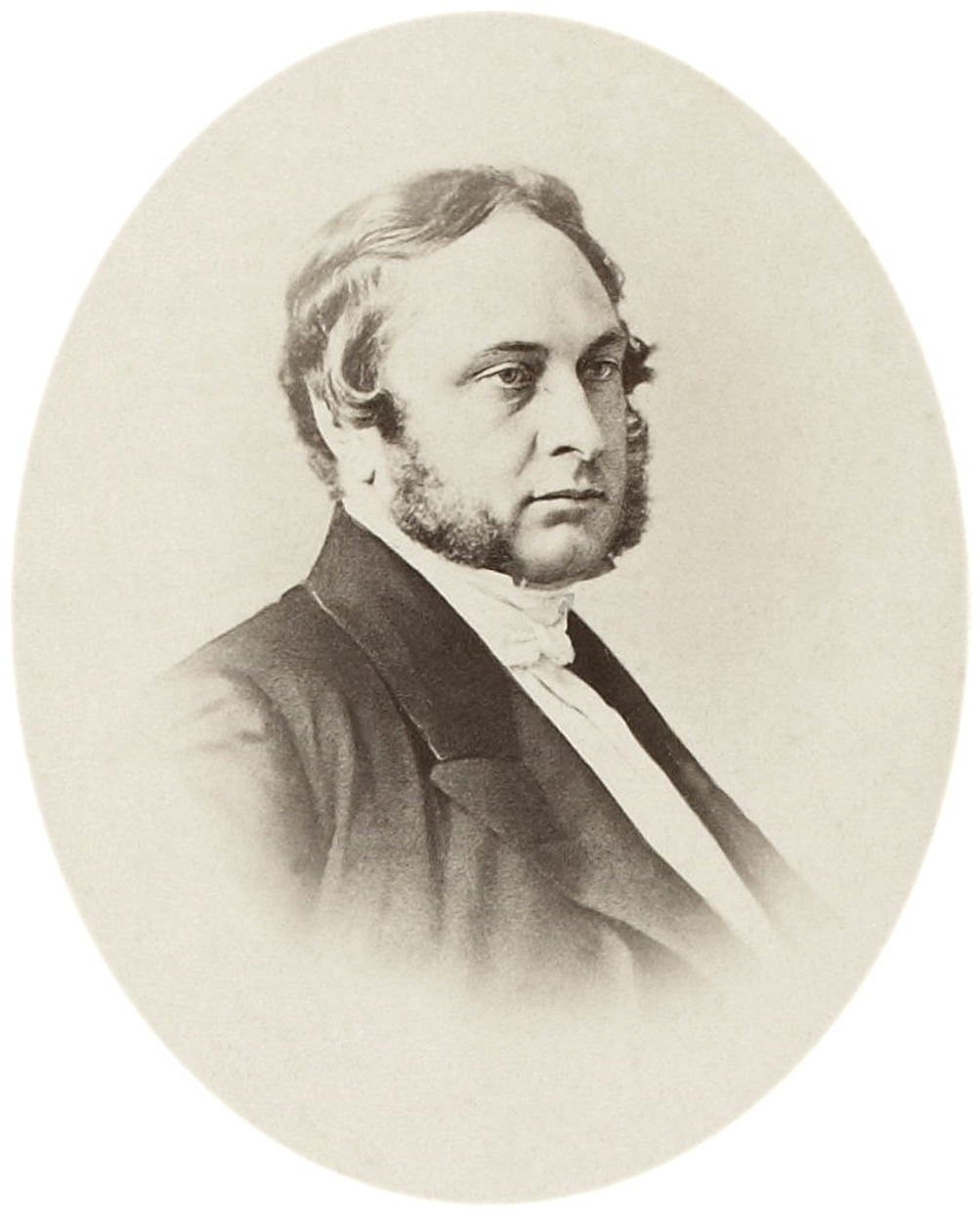
Eugène Rouher (1814–1884), French politician and president of the Senate during the Second Empire, was the leader of the Bonapartiste faction after 1871.

Bonapartism developed after Napoleon I was exiled to the island of Elba. The Bonapartists helped him regain power, leading to a period known as the Hundred Days. Some of his acolytes could not accept his defeat in 1815 at Waterloo or the Congress of Vienna, and continued to promote the Bonaparte ideology. After Napoleon I's death in exile on Saint Helena in 1821, many of these people transferred their allegiance to other members of his family. After the death of Napoleon's son, the Duke of Reichstadt (known to Bonapartists as Napoleon II), Bonapartist hopes rested on several different members of the family.

The revolutions of 1848 gave hope to the nascent political undercurrent. Bonapartism, as an ideology of politically neutral French peasants and workers (EJ Hobsbawm), was essential in the election of Napoleon I's nephew Louis-Napoleon Bonaparte as President of the French Second Republic, and gave him the political support necessary for his 1852 discarding of the constitution and proclaiming the Second French Empire. Louis-Napoleon assumed the title Napoleon III to acknowledge the brief reign of Napoleon II at the end of the Hundred Days in 1815 which resulted in the abdication of Napoleon I.

In 1870, the National Assembly forced Napoleon III to sign a declaration of war against Prussia; France suffered a disastrous defeat in the Franco-Prussian War. The emperor surrendered to the Prussians and their German allies to avoid further bloodshed at the Battle of Sedan. He went into exile after a parliamentary coup created the French Third Republic.

Bonapartists continued to agitate for another member of the family to be placed on the throne. From 1871 forward, they competed with monarchist groups that favoured the restoration of the family of Louis-Philippe I (the Orléanists), who was King of the French from 1830 to 1848, and also with those who favoured the restoration of the House of Bourbon, the traditional French royal family (the Legitimists). The strength of these three factions combined was powerful, but they did not unite on the choice of the new French monarch. Monarchist fervor eventually waned, and the French Republic became more or less a permanent facet of French life. Bonapartism was slowly relegated to being the civic faith of a few romantics as more of a hobby than a practical political philosophy. The death knell for Bonapartism was probably sounded when Eugène Bonaparte, the only son of Napoleon III, was killed in action while serving as a British Army officer in Zululand in 1879. Thereafter, Bonapartism ceased to be a significant political force.

The current head of the Bonaparte family is the great-great-great-grandson of Napoleon I's brother Jérôme, Jean-Christophe Napoléon (born 1986). There are no remaining descendants in the male line from any other of Napoleon's brothers and there is no serious political movement that aims to restore any of these men to the imperial throne of France.

== Ideology ==
Philosophically, Bonapartism was Napoleon's adaptation of the principles of the French Revolution to suit his imperial form of rule. Desires for public order, national glory, and emulation of the Roman Empire had combined to create a Caesarist coup d'etat for General Bonaparte on 18 Brumaire. Although he espoused adherence to revolutionary precedents, he "styled his direct and personal rule on the Old Regime monarchs".

For Bonapartists, the most significant lesson of the Revolution was that unity of government and the governed was paramount. The honey bee was a prominent political emblem for both the First and Second Empires; it represented the Bonapartist ideal of devoted service, self-sacrifice and social loyalty. The defining characteristics of political Bonapartism were flexibility and adaptability. Napoleon III once commented on the diversity of opinions in his cabinet, united under the banner of Bonapartism. Referring to the leading figures in the government of the Second Empire, he remarked: "The Empress is a Legitimist, Morny is an Orléanist, Prince Napoleon is a Republican, and I myself am a Socialist. There is only one Bonapartist, Persigny – and he is mad!"

== Election results ==
Election	Votes	%	Seats	+/–	Leader
Chamber of Representatives
May 1815	4,230 (2nd)	12.7	80 / 630	New	Lucien Bonaparte, Prince Français, Prince of Canino
Chamber of Deputies
1852	5,218,602 (1st)	86.5	253 / 263	▲253	Adolphe Billault
1857	5,471,000 (1st)	89.1	276 / 283	▲23	Charles de Morny
1863	5,355,000 (1st)	74.2	251 / 283	▼25	Charles de Morny
1869	4,455,000 (1st)	55.0	212 / 283	▼39	Émile Ollivier/Adolphe Vuitry
National Assembly
1871	Unknown (5th)	3.1	20 / 630	▼192	
1876	1,056,517 (3rd)	14.3	76 / 533	▲76	Napoléon-Jérôme Bonaparte
Chamber of Deputies
1877	1,617,464 (2nd)	20.0	104 / 521	▲28	Georges-Eugène Haussmann
1881	610,422 (3rd)	8.7	46 / 545	▼58	Georges-Eugène Haussmann
1885	888,104 (4th)	11.2	65 / 584	▲19	
1889	715,804 (5th)	9.0	52 / 578	▼13	

== In the French political spectrum ==
According to historian René Rémond's famous 1954 book Les Droites en France, Bonapartism constitutes one of the three French right-wing families; the latest one after far-right Legitimism and center-right Orléanism. According to him, both Boulangisme and Gaullism are considered to be forms of Bonapartism; however, this has been consistently disputed by Bonapartists and by many other historians. Notable examples of the latter include Vincent Cronin, who referred to Napoleonic government as "middle-of-the-road", as well as André Castelot in his Bonaparte, for whom being above and outside of party struggles was the founding principle of Bonapartism, and Louis Madelin, who describes Napoleon's role in French history as being the great reconciler after the divides and wounds of the French Revolution (conclusion to Histoire du Consulat et de l'Empire). In their own time, both Napoleon I and Napoleon III refused to be classed as either leftist or rightist, arguing that to claim to govern a country in the name of a faction meant acting against the national interest and one day succumbing to its influence. In Des Idées Napoléoniennes (On Napoleonic Ideas), published in 1839, the future Napoleon III quoted his uncle's words to the Council of State on this subject, ending with the following explanation:

"You see, this is why I have composed my Council of State of constituents who were called Moderates or Feuillants, like Defermon, Roederer, Regnier, Regnault; of royalists like Devaines and Dufresnes; lastly of jacobins like Brune, Réal and Berlier. I like honest people of all parties". Prompt to reward recent services, as to shed luster all the great memories, Napoleon has placed in the Hôtel des Invalides, next to the statues of Hoche, of Joubert, of Marceau, of Dugommier, of Dampierre, the statue of Condé, the ashes of Turenne, and the heart of Vauban. He revives, in Orleans, the memory of Joan of Arc, in Beauvais that of Jeanne Hachette ... Always faithful to principles of conciliation, the Emperor, during the course of his reign, gives a pension to the sister of Robespierre, as he does to the mother of the Duke of Orleans.

— Chapter III, p. 31

Bonapartists have consistently disagreed with this classification, as one of the fundamentals of Bonapartism as an ideology is the refusal to adhere to the left-right divide, which they see as an obstacle to the welfare and unity of the nation. Martin S Alexander, in his book French History since Napoleon (London, Arnold, New York, Oxford University Press, 1999) notes that Bonapartism as an idea would not have made a significant impact if it had been classifiable as either left-wing or right-wing. The historian Jean Sagnes in The Roots of Louis-Napoléon Bonaparte's Socialism notes that the future Emperor of the French edited his political works through far-left publishers. Today, the Bonapartist philosophy would fit into the space occupied by the Parti Socialiste, the Mouvement Démocrate, the Nouveau Centre, and the left wing of the conservative Union pour un Mouvement Populaire, as these parties occupy the ideological space between parties advocating class struggle and race-based politics, both of which are anathema to Bonapartists, as contrary to the ideal of national unity and religious and ethnic tolerance. This is demonstrated by Napoleonic policy towards industrial disputes, one expression of which – as Frank McLynn writes – is that strikes were forbidden by Napoleon I but in exchange the police sometimes prevented wages from being lowered, while another is the assimilation and protection of the Jews.

The Marxist theory of Left and Right Bonapartism can be considered an illustration of what McLynn refers to as Napoleon I's appeal in equal measure "to both the Right and the Left", and what Vincent Cronin describes as "middle of the way" or "moderate" government. Napoleon III situated Bonapartism (or the "Napoleonic Idea") between the radicals and conservatives (respectively the Left and the Right) in Des Idées Napoléoniennes, published in 1839. He expounded on this point to explain that Bonapartism, as practiced by his uncle Napoleon the Great and represented by himself was in the middle of "two hostile parties, one of which looks only to the past, and the other only to the future" and combined "the old forms" of the one and the "new principles" of the other. While some French political parties are shaded by Bonapartism's political stance of national unity, since World War II no major parties have advocated for Bonapartism in the sense of a return to the rule of a descendant of the Bonaparte dynasty.

== Modern Bonapartism ==
In contemporary times, the term Bonapartism has been used in a general sense to describe autocratic, highly centralized regimes dominated by the military. In Corsica, where Napoleone di Buonaparte was born, the Bonapartist Central Committee is a political party founded in 1908 in Ajaccio. It remains active in local and regional politics and is often allied with centre-right republican parties.

== Bibliography ==
- Bluche, Frédéric (1980). Le bonapartisme: aux origines de la droite autoritaire (1800-1850). Nouvelles Editions Latines. ISBN 978-2-7233-0104-6.
- Alexander, Robert S. Bonapartism and revolutionary Tradition in France: the Fédérés of 1815 (Cambridge University Press, 2002)
- Baehr, Peter R., and Melvin Richter, eds. Dictatorship in history and theory: Bonapartism, Caesarism, and totalitarianism (Cambridge University Press, 2004)
- Dulffer, Jost. "Bonapartism, Fascism and National Socialism." Journal of Contemporary History (1976): 109–128. In JSTOR
- McLynn, Frank (1998). Napoleon. Pimlico.
- Mitchell, Allan. "Bonapartism as a model for Bismarckian politics." Journal of Modern History (1977): 181–199. In JSTOR
- Bluche, Frédéric, Le Bonapartisme, collection Que sais-je ?, Paris, Presses universitaires de France, 1981.
- Choisel, Francis, Bonapartisme et gaullisme, Paris, Albatros, 1987.
