= The Mountain (1849) =

The Mountain La Montagne
- Leader: Alexandre Auguste Ledru-Rollin
- Founded: 1848; 178 years ago
- Dissolved: 1852; 174 years ago
- Headquarters: Paris, France
- Ideology: Christian socialism Democratic socialism Republicanism; Utopian socialism
- Political position: Left-wing
- Colours: Red

The Mountain (French: La Montagne), with its members collectively called Democratic Socialists (French: Démocrate-socialistes), was a political group of the French Second Republic.

The group drew its name from The Mountain, a group active in the early period of the French Revolution. Standing on a republican platform, its main opposition was the conservative Party of Order.

The Mountain achieved 25% of the vote, compared to 53% for the Party of Order. It was led by Alexandre Auguste Ledru-Rollin, one of the members of the Second Republic's early provisional government.

== History ==
Performance by department of the Democratic Socialists on the May 1849 legislative election

After 1848, the Odilon Barrot's Party of Order-backed government sought to repress protests against alcohol excises and the 45 centime land tax as well as demand for cheap credit and other grievances. The Democratic Socialists clandestinely organized this dissent in the face of press censorship, restrictions on political meetings and harassment. Prior to the founding of The Mountain, the Solidarité républicaine organized early dissent among radical republicans. The Mountain's broader strategy was to prepare for the 1852 legislative and presidential elections by continuing to espouse its 'utopian' Christian socialist message alongside attempts to politicize the three million voters who had been disenfranchised in 1850 despite the Republic's constitution proclaiming universal manhood suffrage. Karl Marx again found cause for criticism, accusing The Mountain of impotently "prophesying future victories". On the 1849 legislative election, there were more votes cast for The Mountain candidates than for Ledru-Rollin (Democratic Socialist) and Raspail (Socialist) combined in the 1848 presidential election.

The causes behind The Mountain's success amongst particular demographics are disputed. Ted Margadant, Peter McPhee and John M. Merriman have argued that the peasant vote signalled an acceptance of modernization whilst Max Weber, Peter M. Jones and Alain Corbin have argued that peasant support was typical, even if the provincial rivalries and support for negative demands such as low taxation present were cloaked in urban political lexicon. Robert Tombs has pointed out that the demands of voters were expressed in a number of different ways and that support was fleeting (wine growers were also prepared to back Louis-Napoléon Bonaparte or the Bourbons to get excise duties cut) and that peasants in the south-west and Massif Central who backed The Mountain also accepted Bonaparte after his coup d'état of 1851 and the end of the Second Republic.

For the remainder of the Second Empire, Bonaparte found the core of his support lay in the peasantry. Resistance to the coup d'état was most strongly present in the normally republican regions, again suggesting continuity. When in the most widespread popular uprising of the 19th century they organized protests against the coup d'état that numbered 100,000 strong, it was in mainly Protestant areas that The Mountain derived its most cohesive support.

== Ideology ==
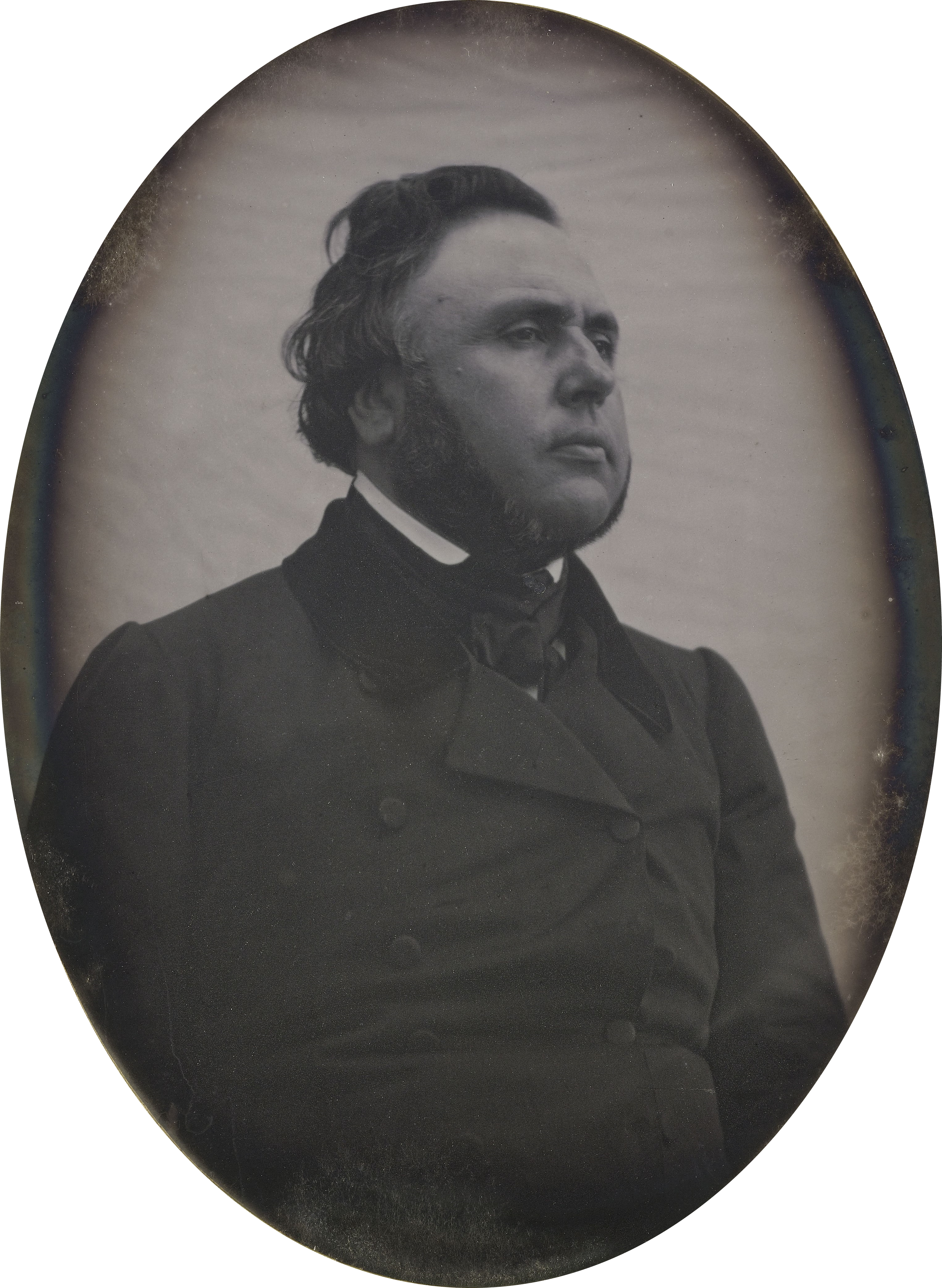
Alexandre Auguste Ledru-Rollin led The Mountain of 1849

The Mountain stood on a platform of low taxation, which made it popular with peasants, especially in industries that were suffering, such as agriculture and forestry. France sustained steady economic growth during the latter part of the Restoration and the July Monarchy, although the late 1840s witnessed a downturn, which was one of the factors behind the 1848 Revolution.

The National Workshops proved unpopular with the peasantry and despite being formed by urban left-wing politicians The Mountain was particularly successful in rural areas such as central France and the western and central départments in and around the Massif Central. The Mountain promised to end the land tax of 45 centimes used to finance the National Workshops, reform military service and develop education.

Traditionally pro-revolutionary, left-wing and Protestant areas of the south, affected by a slump in the wine trade, also backed The Mountain in 1849. Friedrich Engels and later Marx attributed the relative lack of support for The Mountain in the urban proletariat to distrust engendered by Alexandre Auguste Ledru-Rollin's involvement in and refusal to condemn the suppression of the June Days uprising.

Later in The Eighteenth Brumaire of Louis Napoleon, Marx cited The Mountain's formation in the Second Republic as one of the many instances in this regime of history repeating itself "as farce".

== Notable members ==
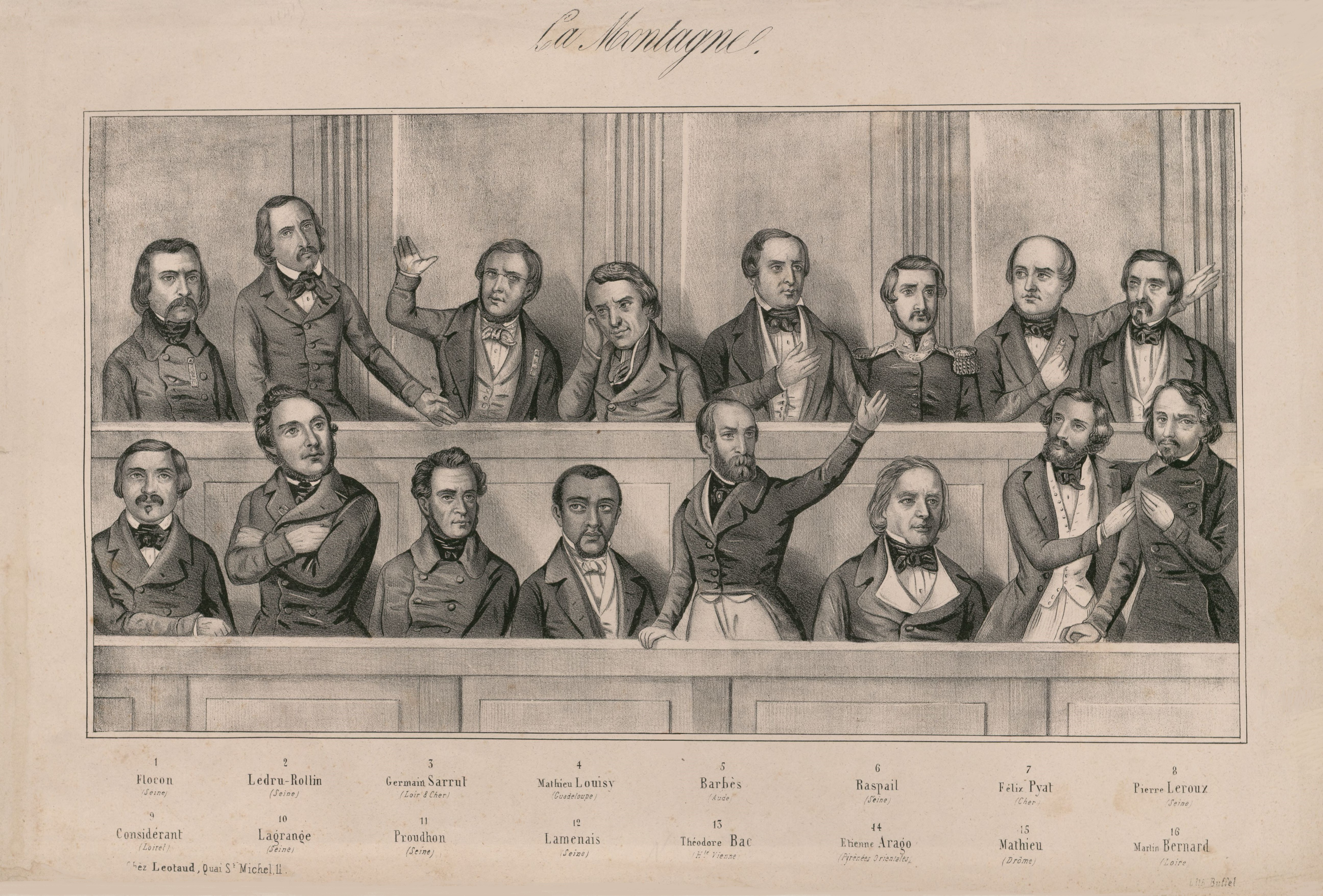
Members of The Mountain at the National constituent assembly in 1848

- Émile de Girardin
- Louis Blanc
- Alexandre Auguste Ledru-Rollin
- Jonas Ennery
- Henri-François-Alphonse Esquiros
- Louis Auguste Blanqui
- Alexandre Martin
- Ferdinand Flocon
- Armand Marrast
- Victor Schoelcher

== Electoral results ==
National Assembly
Election year	No. of overall votes	% of overall vote	No. of overall seats won	+/–	Leader
1848	705,180 (3rd)	9.1	80 / 880	–	Louis Auguste Blanqui
1849	1,955,000 (2nd)	29.6	180 / 705	▲100	Alexandre Ledru-Rollin
