= Moderate Republicans (France, 1848–1870) =

Parliamentary group in the French Second Republic

Moderate Republicans Républicains modérés
- Leaders: Alphonse de Lamartine; Émile Ollivier; François Arago; Louis-Eugène Cavaignac
- Founded: 1848; 178 years ago
- Dissolved: 1870; 156 years ago
- Succeeded by: Moderate Republicans (1871); Republican Union
- Headquarters: Paris, France
- Newspaper: Le National; L'Avenir national
- Ideology: Liberalism (French); Republicanism (French); Parliamentarism
- Political position: Centre-left
- Colours: Orange

The Moderate Republicans were a large political group active from the birth of the French Second Republic (1848) to the collapse of the Second French Empire (1870).

== History ==
=== During the Second Republic ===
Originally, the Moderate Republicans was a group of politicians, writers and journalists close to the newspaper Le National. After the February Revolution of 1848, they became the official majority group in the Provisional Government led by Louis-Eugène Cavaignac, François Arago and Dupont de l'Eure that became the official head of the government. Reputed to be the winners of the 1848 Constituent Assembly election, the Moderate Republicans were strategically allied to The Mountain, the left-wing group, against the monarchists.

During this time, the Moderate Republicans were also divided in two groups, namely the Sleeping Republicans (active until the February Revolution) and the Morning-after Republicans that opportunistically endorsed the new regime. The latter were the Legitimists who hated the Orléanist July Monarchy and the Catholics who suffered until the Louis Philippe I's restrictions. After the 1848 election, the Moderate Republicans became the majority in the National Assembly, but this group was composed mainly of Morning-after Republicans with a temporary union.

The formation of the Executive Commission was de facto dominated by the Moderate Republicans, with few concessions to the socialists. However, after the June Days uprising the opportunist group led by Adolphe Thiers started a hard politics against the socialists. The problems convinced the General Louis-Eugène Cavaignac, strong republican, to take over the Moderate Republicans, who was also the favourite candidate for the incumbent presidential election.

The internal conflict in the Moderate Republicans caused a division regarding the official candidate between Cavaignac and Louis-Napoléon Bonaparte, but at the end chose to support Cavaignac. Bonaparte's victory in the presidential election of 1848 signalled the end of the Moderate Republicans government. The legislative elections of 1849 brought the Moderate Republicans' isolation as they obtained only 75 seats, down from 600 the previous year, losing to the conservative Party of Order. The disown was massive.

=== Under the Second Empire ===
After 1849, the main opponents of the now commonly named Republicans were the Catholic Church, for its counter-revolutionary and reactionary ideas. However, Louis-Napoléon Bonaparte was a strong supporter of clericalism and the Concordat of 1801. In this time, the Republicans and the Bonapartists started a bitter rivalry. After the coup d'état of 1851 and the proclamation of the Second French Empire, Napoleon III (the official title of Louis-Napoléon Bonaparte) repressed the Republicans, with 239 being imprisoned to Cayenne and 6,000 of 10,000 people interned in military camps in Algeria while some were guillotined or sentenced to house arrest in France. At the end, around 1,500 Republicans like Victor Hugo were exiled from France. Despite the amnesty of 15 August 1859, some exiled Republicans did not return to France until after the end of the Second Empire (like Hugo, former Montagnard Ledru-Rollin, Louis Blanc and Armand Barbès). Hugo coined the expression "When liberty returns, I will return".

With the weakening of the French Empire, the Republicans returned to the political scene and took advantage of the liberal laws of 1868 and some diplomatic difficulties. They became the official opposition group with the Léon Gambetta's Belleville Agenda of 1869 based on radical, progressive, laicist and reformist goals. In the final years of the French Empire, the Republicans were divided in three factions:

- The Moderates like Émile Ollivier that accepted Napoleon III's rule and the French Empire's ideas.
- The Pragmatics, de jure aligned with the Empire, but de facto its enemies.
- The Close Left, whom refused to vow loyalty to the French Empire and checked out of the political scene.

The Republicans officially ended with the Paris Commune of 1871 and the consolidation of the French Third Republic when its leaders started two different groups, namely the Moderate Republicans (also known as the Opportunist Republicans) and the Republican Union.

== Electoral results ==
=== Presidential elections ===
Election year	Candidate	Votes	%	Won/Loss
1848	Louis-Eugène Cavaignac	1,448,107	19.6%	Loss

=== Legislative elections ===
National Assembly
Election year	No. of overall votes	% of overall vote	No. of overall seats won	+/–	Leader
1848	5,328,022 (1st)	68.2%	600 / 880	New	Alphonse de Lamartine
1849	834,000 (3rd)	12.6%	75 / 705	▼525	Louis-Eugène Cavaignac
Legislative Body
1852	810 962 (3rd)	13.4%	3 / 263	N/A	Unorganized
1857	665,000 (2nd)	10.9%	7 / 283	▲4	Michel Goudchaux
1863	794,640 (2nd)	10.7%	17 / 283	▲10	Émile Ollivier
1869	893,860 (4th)	10.6%	30 / 283	▲13	Léon Gambetta
a: Presented as common opposition with Royalists to Bonapartist ministerials.

== See also ==
- France during the 19th century
- 1849 French legislative election
- History of the Left in France
- Politics of France
