= May 1815 French legislative election =

- 8–22 May 1815

All 629 seats in the Chamber of Representatives 315 seats needed for a majority
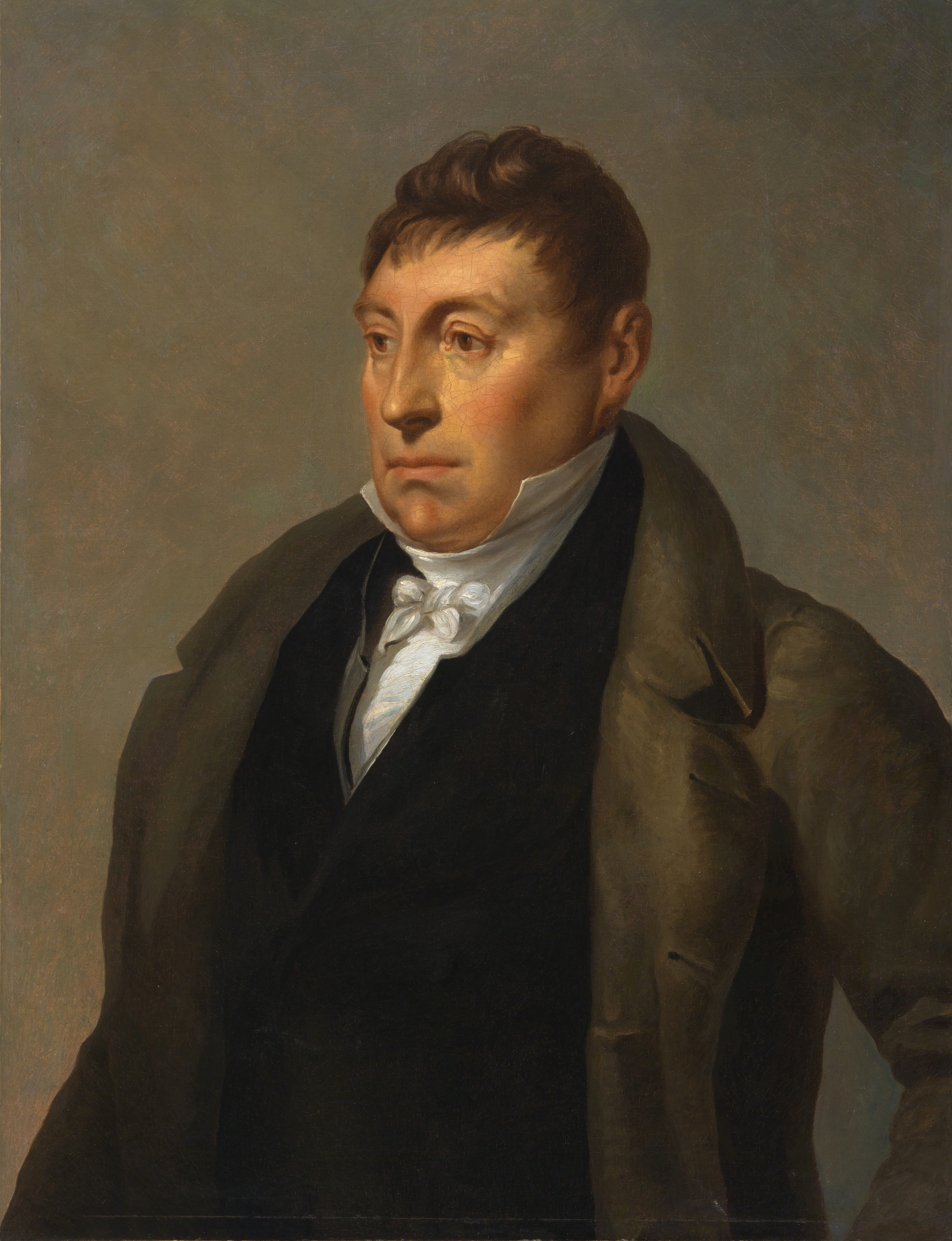

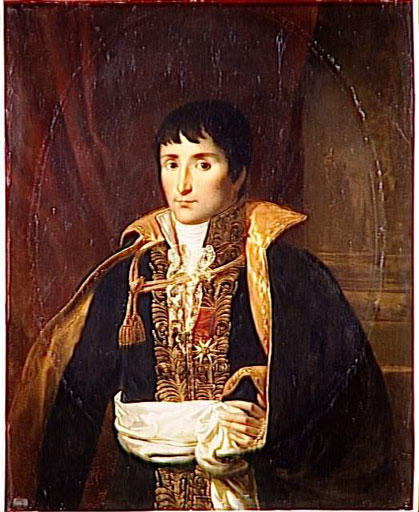

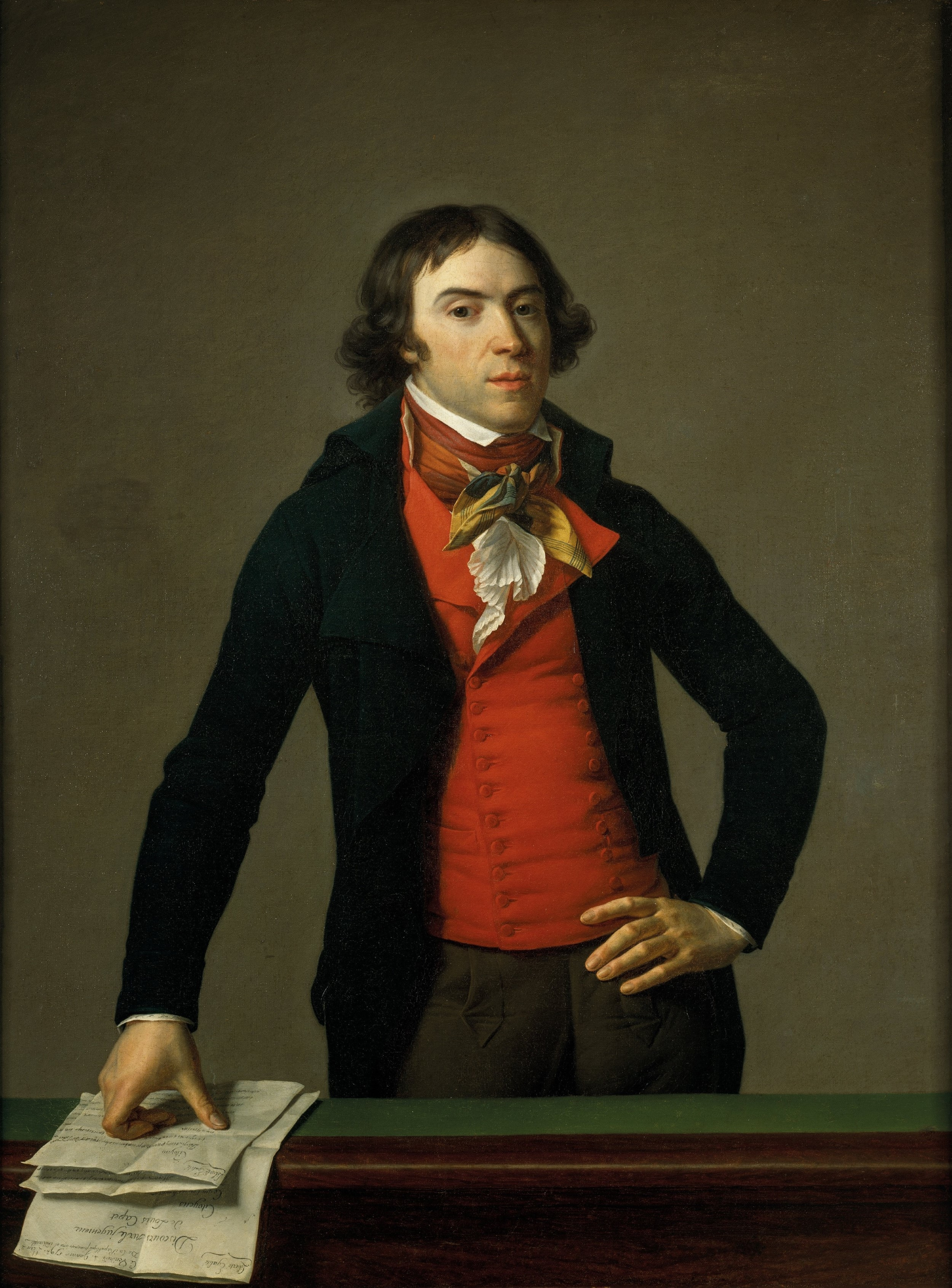
	First party	Second party	Third party
Leader	Gilbert du Motier	Lucien Bonaparte	Bertrand Barère
Party	Liberals	Bonapartists	Jacobins
Seats won	~500	~80	30–40
Elected President of the Executive Commission
Joseph Fouché

Legislative elections were held in France between 8 and 22 May 1815 for the period of the Hundred Days. The elections were held to appoint deputies to the Chamber of Representatives established by the Additional Charter of 22 April 1815. The elections were the first since April 1799 and last of the 'republican system' until the Charter of 1830.

== Background ==
After his return from the Isle of Elba and his entry into Paris on 20 March 1815, Napoleon Bonaparte returned to the throne. Aware that most of the French no longer wanted the authoritarian regime established in Year VIII and desirous of making the Bourbons completely forgotten, the Emperor resolved to liberalise the regime. For this, he had a new constitution drafted by Benjamin Constant, the Act additional to the constitutions of the Empire, which took up a good part of the liberal elements of the Charter of 1814.

This act overhauled the Parliament, which was divided into two chambers: the Chamber of Peers, made up of hereditary peers appointed by the Emperor, and the Chamber of Representatives, which was elected by census suffrage.

In the system established by the Charter of 1815, each district or department formed an electoral college. The college would provide the framework of the elections in France for the next 100 years and continues in a similar fashion today. Each college would table the votes cast by those eligible (any man of 25 years or older who paid taxes).

There were 13 further 'special districts' established also known as arrondissements, between which the votes are equally divided according to a second table. These special districts represented certain areas of high concentrations of essential workers, like merchants, shipowners, bankers, etc. The electoral system therefore left 629 representatives from the departments, and 23 of which were from these special districts.

The Additional Act was ratified by plebiscite on 1 June, but with a very large abstention. In fact, this new constitution did not satisfy many. While royalists were obviously hostile to it, the Liberals and republicans found it too conservative. The liberal bourgeoisie criticized the text in particular for not leaving enough initiative to the representatives in legislative matters.

== Results ==
In order to elect the Chamber of Representatives, the electoral colleges were convened for 8 May 1815, when Napoleon could very well have postponed the election in view of the international situation. Thus the constitution comes into force even before the people have spoken about it. Under these conditions, voter turnout was very low: in 67 departments out of 87, the colleges were unable to achieve the 50%+1 turnout that the law required. Overall turnout was 37% in the departments (7,538 of 20,431 electors) and 45% in the arrondissements (32,538 of 72,199 electors). In Marseille, a city where the bourgeoisie was royalist, just thirteen electors choose four deputies.

Party	Votes	%	Seats
Liberals			~500
Bonapartists			~80
Jacobin Republicans			30–40
Total			629
Total votes	40,076	–	
Registered voters/turnout	92,630	43.26	
Source: Boudon, Hussey
