= Jules Baroche =

French statesman (1802–1870)

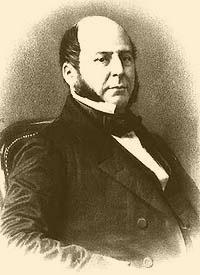

Minister of Foreign Affairs
- In office 10 April 1851 – 26 October 1851
- Preceded by: Alexandre Colonna-Walewski
- Succeeded by: Édouard Thouvenel

Personal details
- Born: 18 November 1802
- Died: 29 October 1870 (aged 67)

Pierre Jules Baroche (French pronunciation: [pjɛʁ ʒyl baʁɔʃ]; 18 November 1802, Paris – 29 October 1870, Jersey) was a French statesman, who served as minister in several of Napoleon III's governments. He was Minister of the Interior from 15 March 1850 to 24 January 1851, Minister of Foreign Affairs from 10 April 1851 to 26 October 1851, President of the Conseil d'État from 30 December 1852, briefly Minister of Foreign Affairs again from 4 January 1860 to 24 January 1860, Minister without portfolio from 3 December 1860, and Minister of Justice (and of Public Worship) from 23 June 1863 to 17 July 1869.

Born to a family of shopkeepers, Baroche received his baccalauréat in 1820 and pursued a legal education, becoming a lawyer in 1823. He became moderately well-known and somewhat notorious as a lawyer, particularly in his pleadings before the Cours des pairs (Court of Peers). He defended former Defense Minister Amédée Louis Despans-Cubières from corruption charges before the peers in 1847.

Baroche ran for office unsuccessfully in Seine-et-Oise in 1840, 1842 and 1846, finally winning a National Assembly seat in Charente-Inférieure in 1847. He strongly opposed the government of François Guizot and took part in its overthrow. A sincere republican during the 1848 revolution, he represented Charente-Inférieure at the constituent assembly of the Second Republic. After 1848, however, he became associated with right wing politics and particularly with the purge of leftist and royalist judges from the French courts and with the defense of the many press censorship laws passed as the republic became increasingly authoritarian. He resigned his ministry in 1851 in a disagreement with French president Louis Napoleon, and he refused to participate in the coup d'état of 14 January 1852 that established the Second Empire, but became president of the Conseil d'État in December of the same year, remaining in that powerful post for most of the next decade. He was appointed a Grand Cross of the Legion of Honor on 3 February 1855.

Following liberal reforms in 1860, Napoleon III appointed Baroche to a ministry without portfolio, while he was still president of the Conseil d'État, in order to shore up his support in parliament. Baroch's appointment to the Ministry of Justice was his principal role in the 1860s, but in the end, as the political tide turned against the Empire, he declined in popularity and was dismissed by the Emperor in 1869, although he appointed Baroche to the French Senate. Nonetheless, Baroche was so closely linked to the Empire and its repressive policies that, like many other high-ranking officials in the imperial government, he fled to Great Britain as the Second Empire crumbled, dying shortly afterwards on the island of Jersey.

Political offices
Preceded by Alexandre Colonna-Walewski	Minister of Foreign Affairs; 10 April 1851 – 26 October 1851	Succeeded by Édouard Thouvenel
