= 1869 French legislative election =

- 24 May and 1 June 1869 (first round); 6–7 June 1869 (second round)
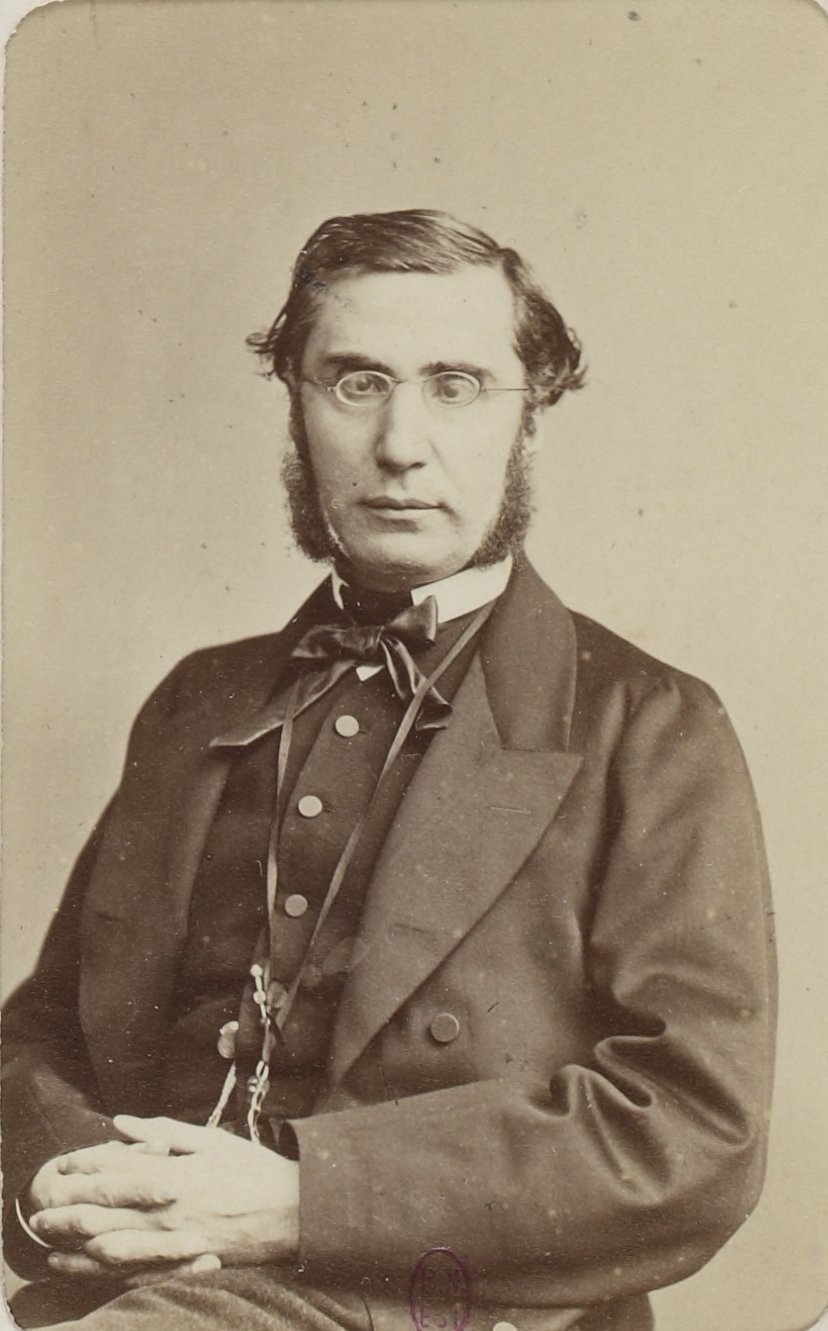

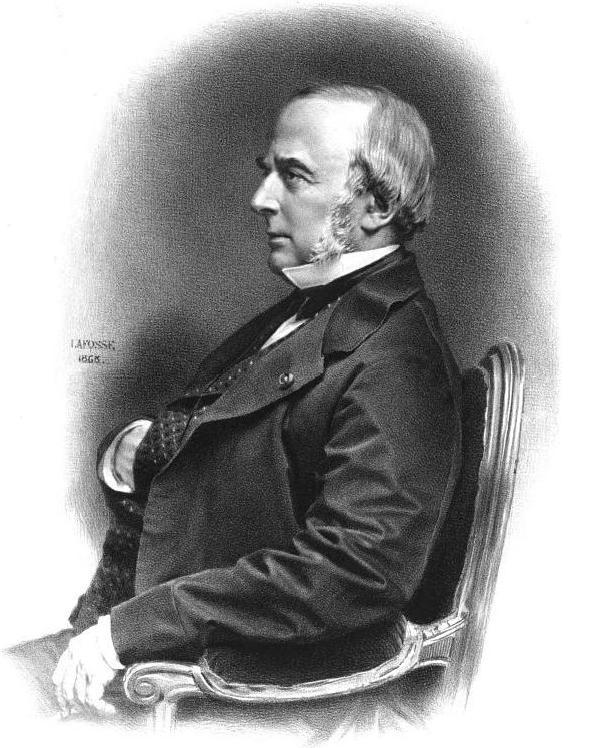

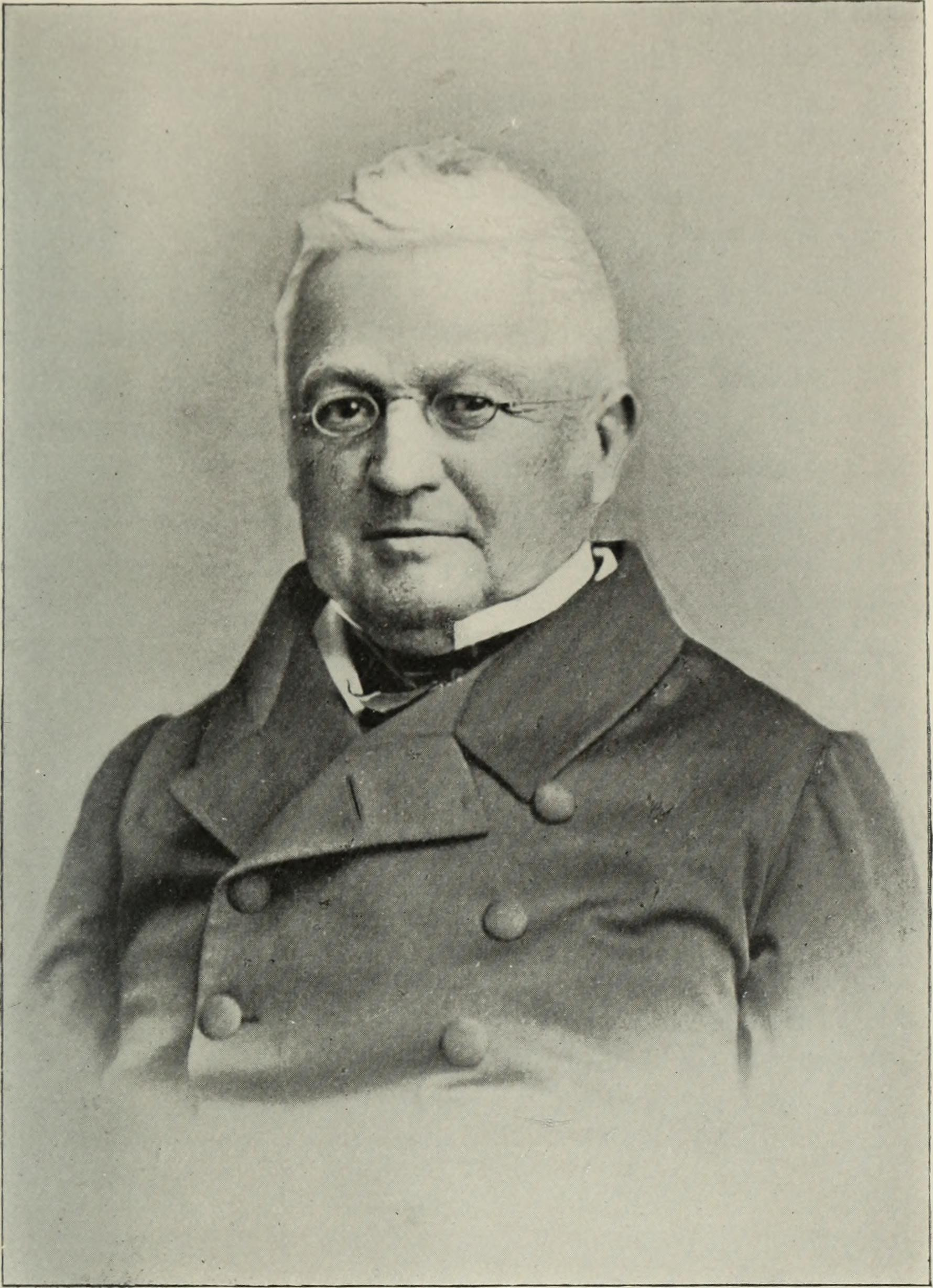

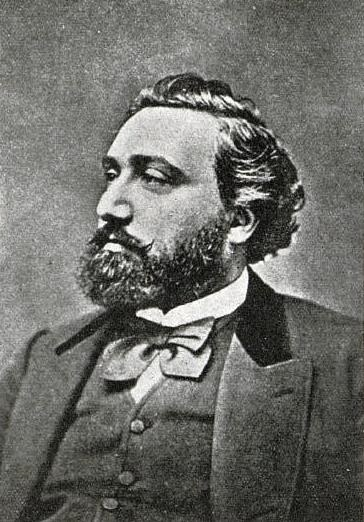
	First party	Second party
Leader	Émile Ollivier	Adolphe Vuitry
Party	Liberal Bonapartists	Conservative Bonapartists
Seats won	120	92
	Third party	Fourth party
Leader	Adolphe Thiers	Léon Gambetta
Party	Legitimists	Republicans
Seats won	41	30
Prime Minister before election
Adolphe Vuitry
Conservative Bonapartist
Elected Prime Minister
Prosper de Chasseloup-Laubat
Liberal Bonapartist

Parliamentary elections were held in France on 24 May and 1 June 1869, with a second round on 6 and 7 June. These elections resulted in a victory for the regime of the Second Empire, but the opposition strengthened its presence in the legislature. Nationwide, the regime won 55% of the vote. In Paris, the opposition parties (mostly Republicans) won 75% of the vote; however, the regime won large majorities in the countryside.

== Results ==
Party	Votes	%	Seats
Liberal Bonapartists	4,455,000	55.70	120
Conservative Bonapartists	4,455,000	55.70	92
Legitimists	3,543,000	44.30	41
Republicans	3,543,000	44.30	30
Total	7,998,000	100.00	283
Valid votes	7,998,000	98.44	
Invalid/blank votes	127,000	1.56	
Total votes	8,125,000	100.00	
Registered voters/turnout	10,416,666	78.00	
Source: Nohlen & Stöver, Kings and Presidents

== Aftermath ==
On the nights of 8–9 June 1869, the worst rioting in fifteen years, "the 'white overalls' riots", erupted in several cities throughout France. In Paris, on 8 June, demonstrators assembled on the Boulevard Montmartre and sang the "Marseillaise" (banned under the Second Empire until the Franco-Prussian War); but that was over in an hour. In Belleville the crowd destroyed gas street lamps and shop fronts before marching down the Boulevard du Temple, where they attacked a police van, on their way to the Place de la Bastille, where thirteen people were arrested before order was restored at 2 a.m. by the sergents-de-ville (uniformed police). Many said that the police overreacted to the natural exuberance of the crowd at the favorable showing of liberal candidates in the election, and that the further disturbances on the 9th were in consequence. The crowds reached as far as the Place du Carrousel on at least one night, disrupting a gala soirée at the Tuileries Palace, although the emperor remained impassive in the face of a stream of telegrams and Émile Waldteufel's baton was steady. On the 10th, the Prefect of Police issued a proclamation saying that such disturbances would no longer be tolerated. Cavalry and infantry units were brought in to patrol the streets. A total of 1,100 people were arrested and confined for a time in Bicêtre fortress.

Similar disturbances took place on 8 June in Bordeaux and Arles, and on 9 June in Nantes.
