= 1848 French Constituent Assembly election =

- 23 and 24 April 1848

All 880 seats in the National Assembly 441 seats needed for a majority
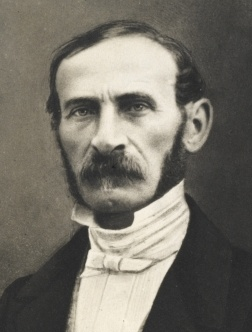

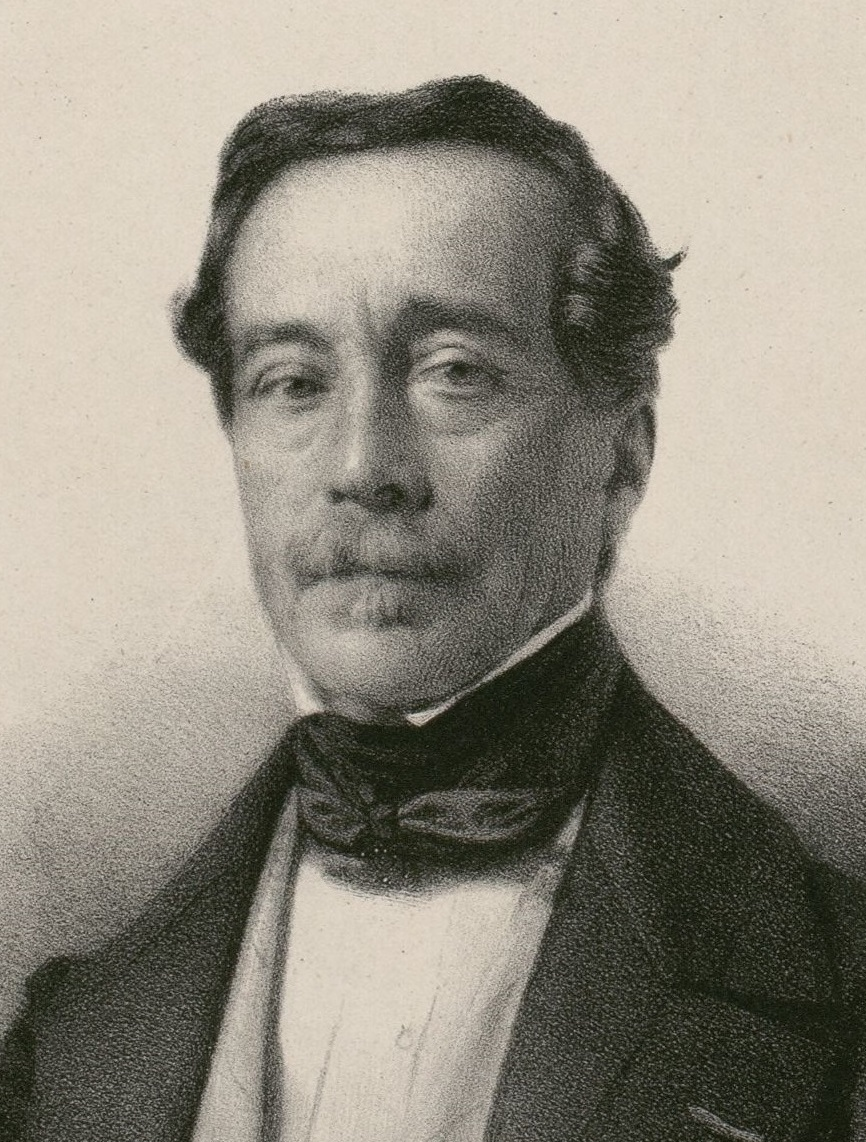

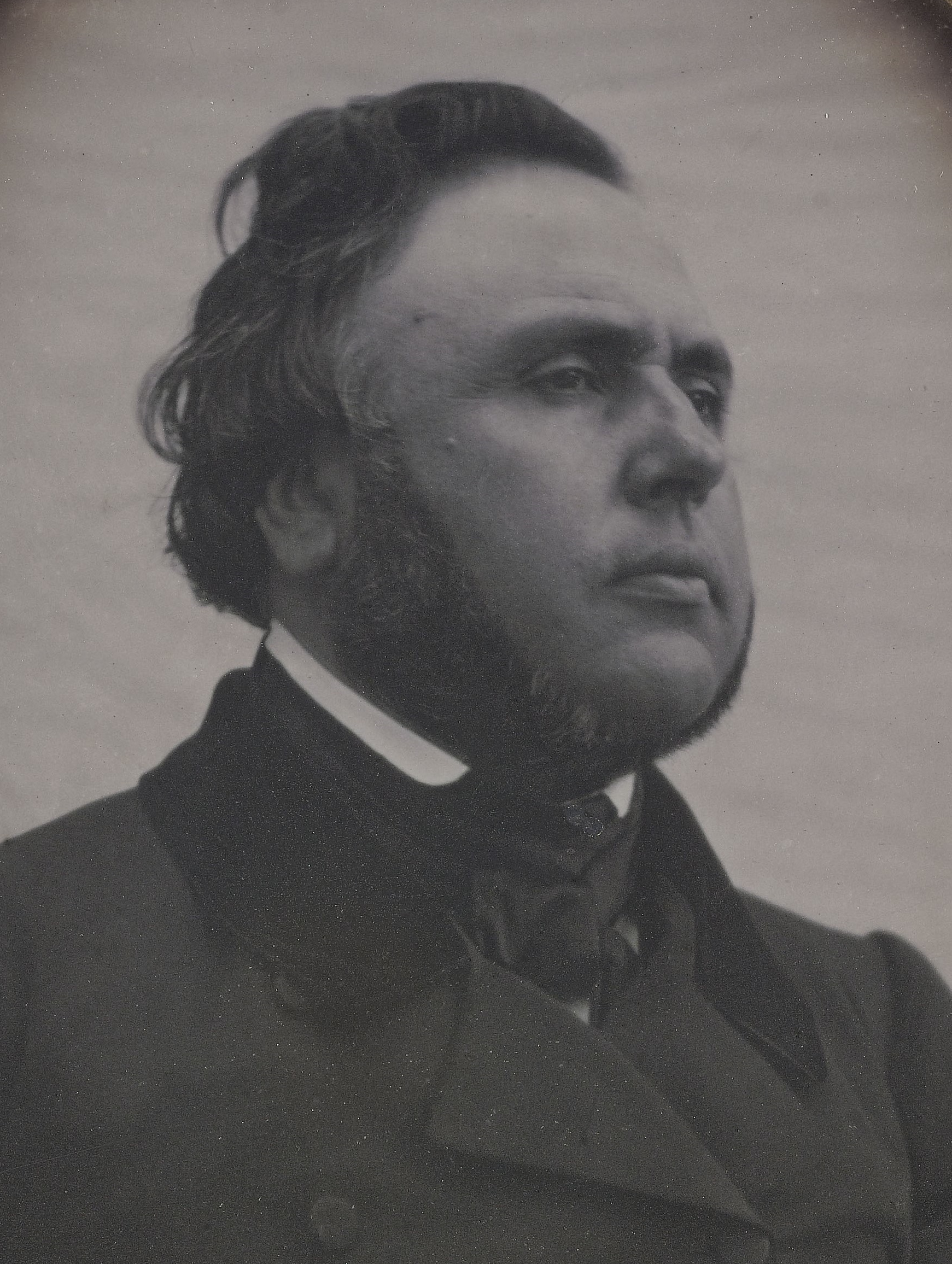
	First party	Second party	Third party
Leader	Louis Eugène Cavaignac	Nicolas Changarnier	Alexandre Ledru-Rollin
Party	Moderate Republicans	Party of Order	Montagnard
Seats won	600	200	80
Prime Minister before election
Jacques-Charles Dupont
Moderate Republicans
Elected Prime Minister
Jacques-Charles Dupont
Moderate Republicans

Constituent Assembly elections were held in France on 23 and 24 April 1848 to elect the Constituent Assembly of the new Second Republic. Over nine million citizens were eligible to vote in the first French election since 1792 held under male universal suffrage.

== Results ==
Due to the lack of party organisation, seat counts by faction are not definitive, with several authors drawing up different counts. One of the counts is listed below.

Party	Votes	%	Seats
Moderate Republicans			600
Party of Order			200
Montagnard			80
Total			880
Total votes	7,835,327	–	
Registered voters/turnout	9,395,035	83.40	
Source: Rois et Presidents
