= 1863 French legislative election =

- 21–June 1863 (first round); 5–6 July 1863 (second round)
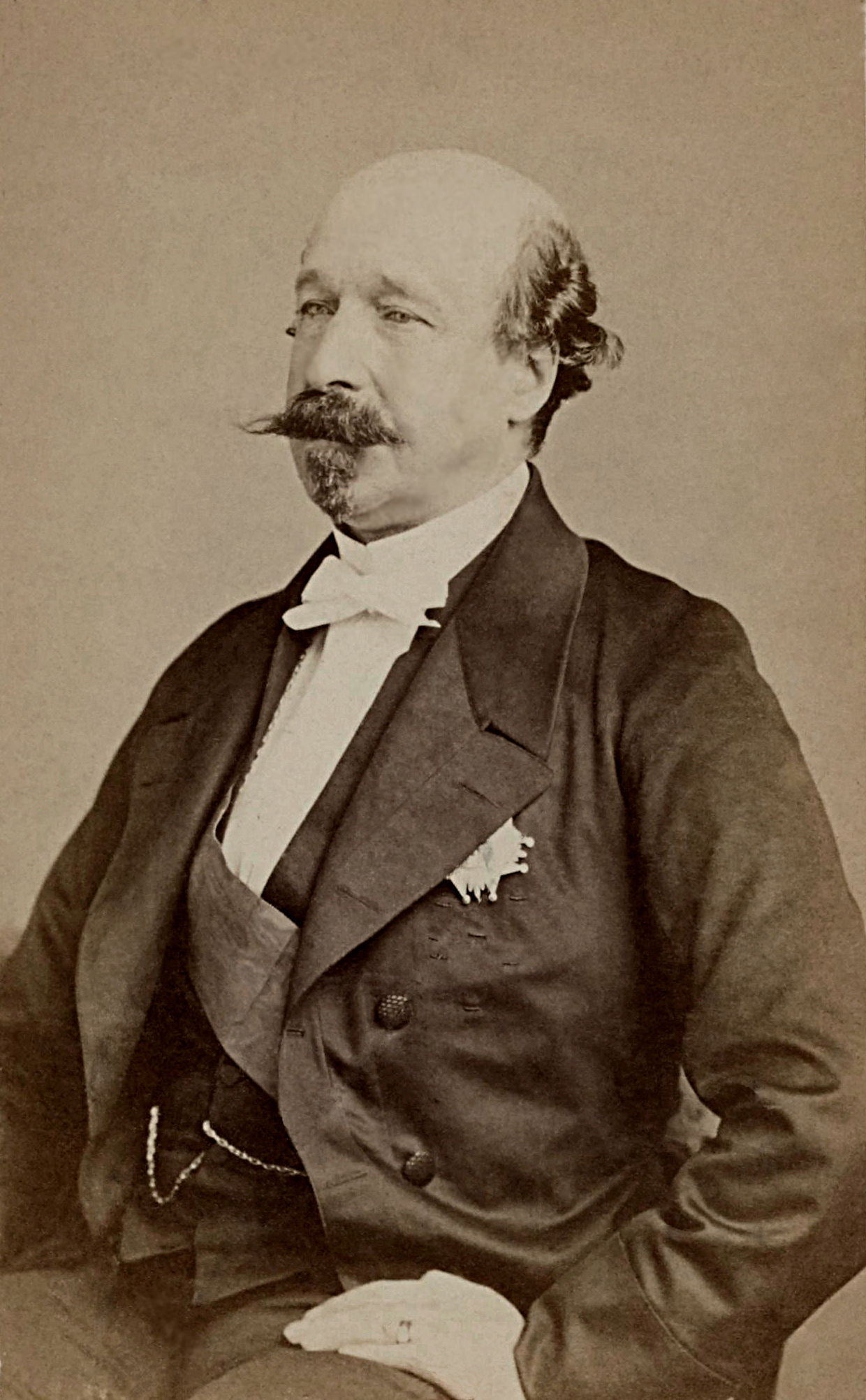

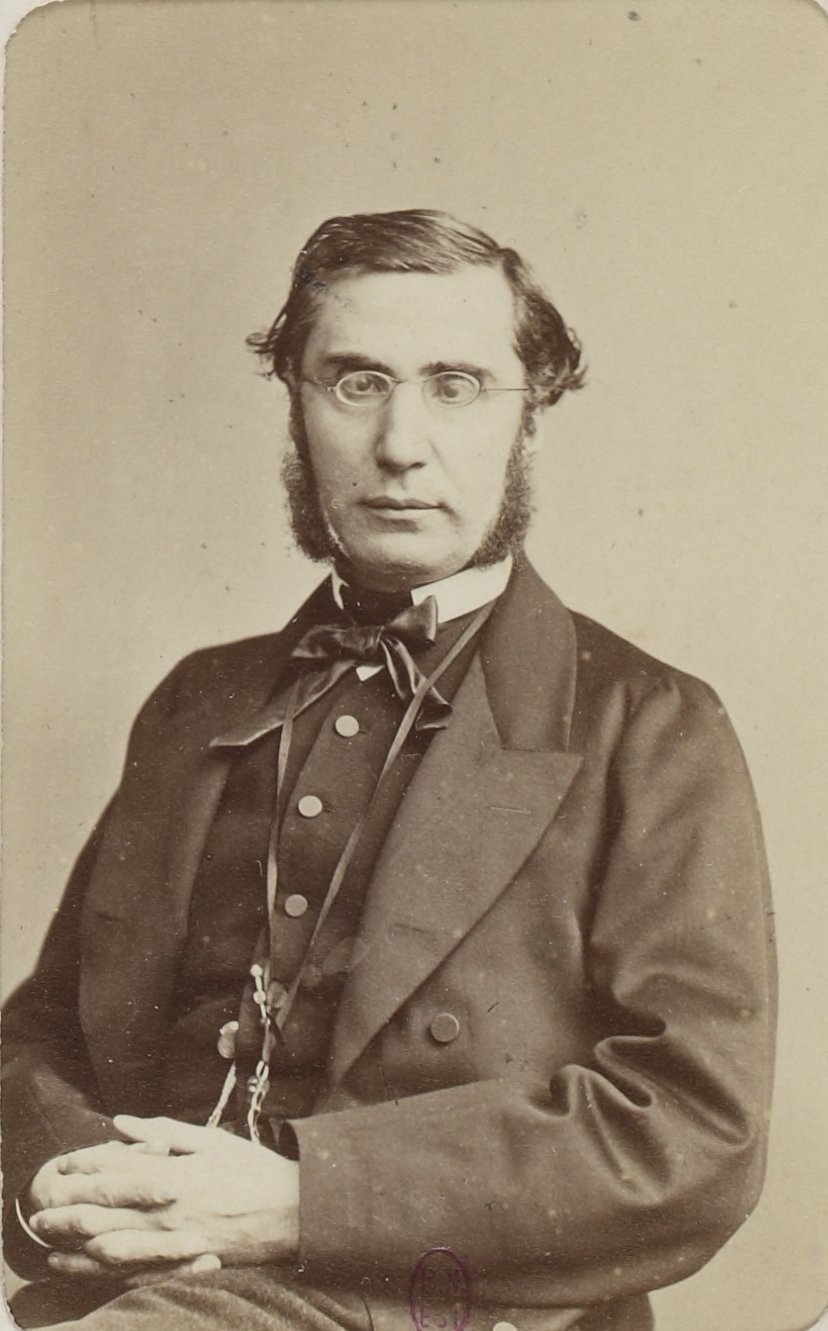

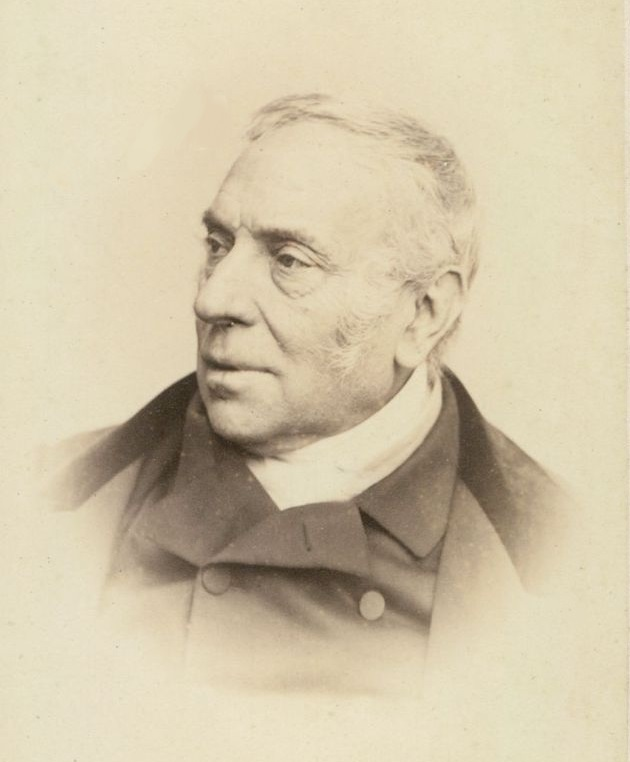
	First party	Second party	Third party
Leader	Charles de Morny	Émile Ollivier	Pierre-Antoine Berryer
Party	Bonapartists	Republicans	Legitimists
Seats won	251	17	15
Prime Minister before election
Jules Baroche
Bonapartist
Elected Prime Minister
Eugène Rouher
Bonapartist

Parliamentary elections were held in France on 21 and 22 June 1863, with a second round on 5 and 6 July. Pro-government candidates won a majority of seats.

== Results ==
Party	Votes	%	Seats
Bonapartists	5,355,000	74.22	251
Republicans	1,860,000	25.78	17
Legitimists	1,860,000	25.78	15
Total	7,215,000	100.00	283
Valid votes	7,215,000	98.97	
Invalid/blank votes	75,000	1.03	
Total votes	7,290,000	100.00	
Registered voters/turnout	10,004,028	72.87	
Source: Nohlen & Stöver, Kings and Presidents
