= 1849 French legislative election =

- 13 and 14 May 1849

All 705 seats in the National Assembly 353 seats needed for a majority
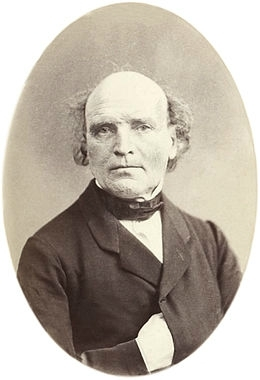

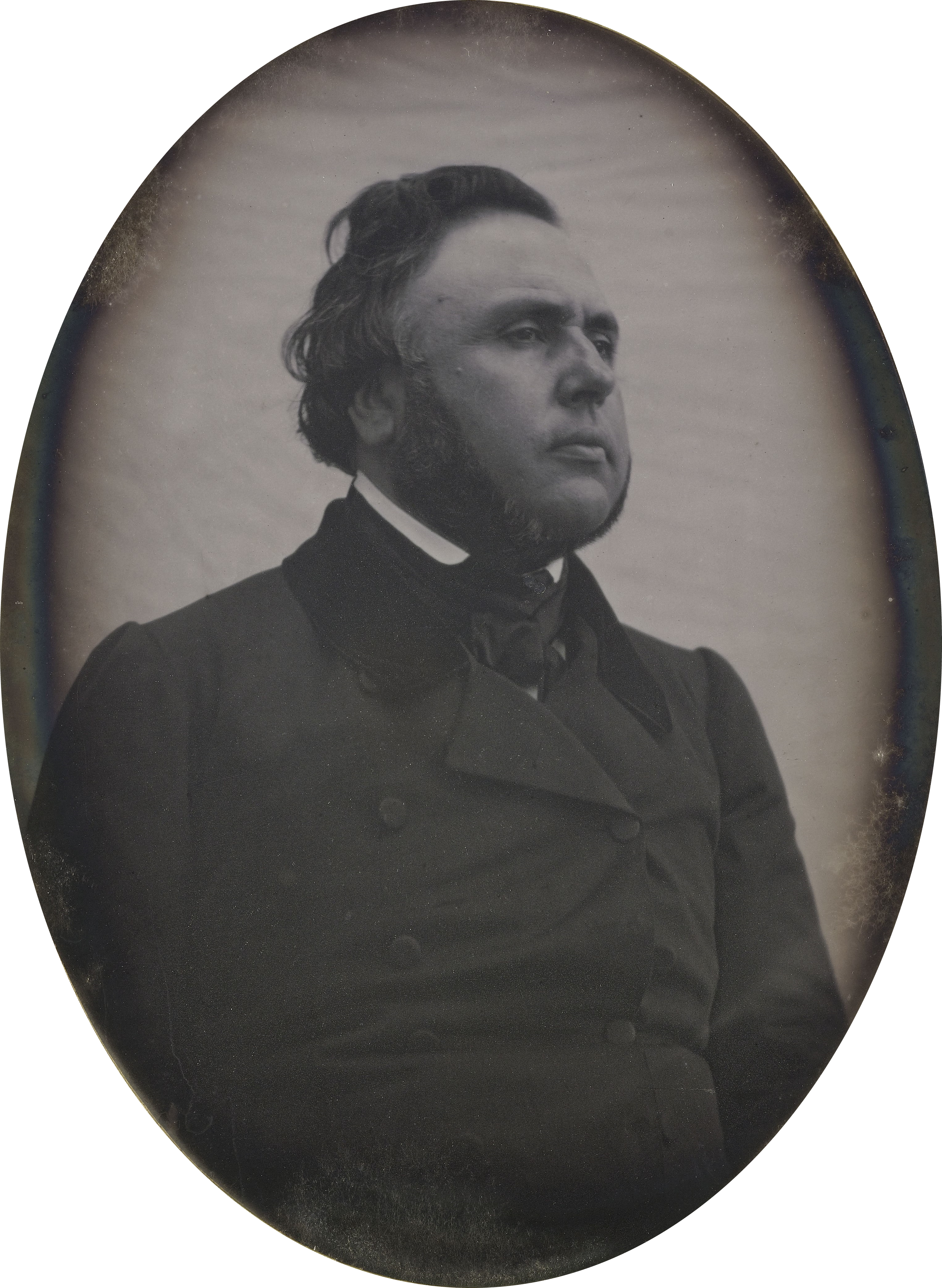

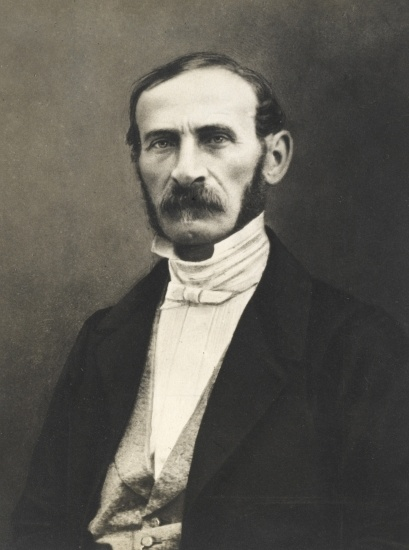
	First party	Second party	Third party
Leader	Odilon Barrot	Alexandre Auguste Ledru-Rollin	Louis-Eugène Cavaignac
Party	Party of Order	Montagnard	Republican
Seats won	450	180	75
Popular vote	3,310,000	1,955,000	834,000
Percentage	50.20%	29.65%	12.65%
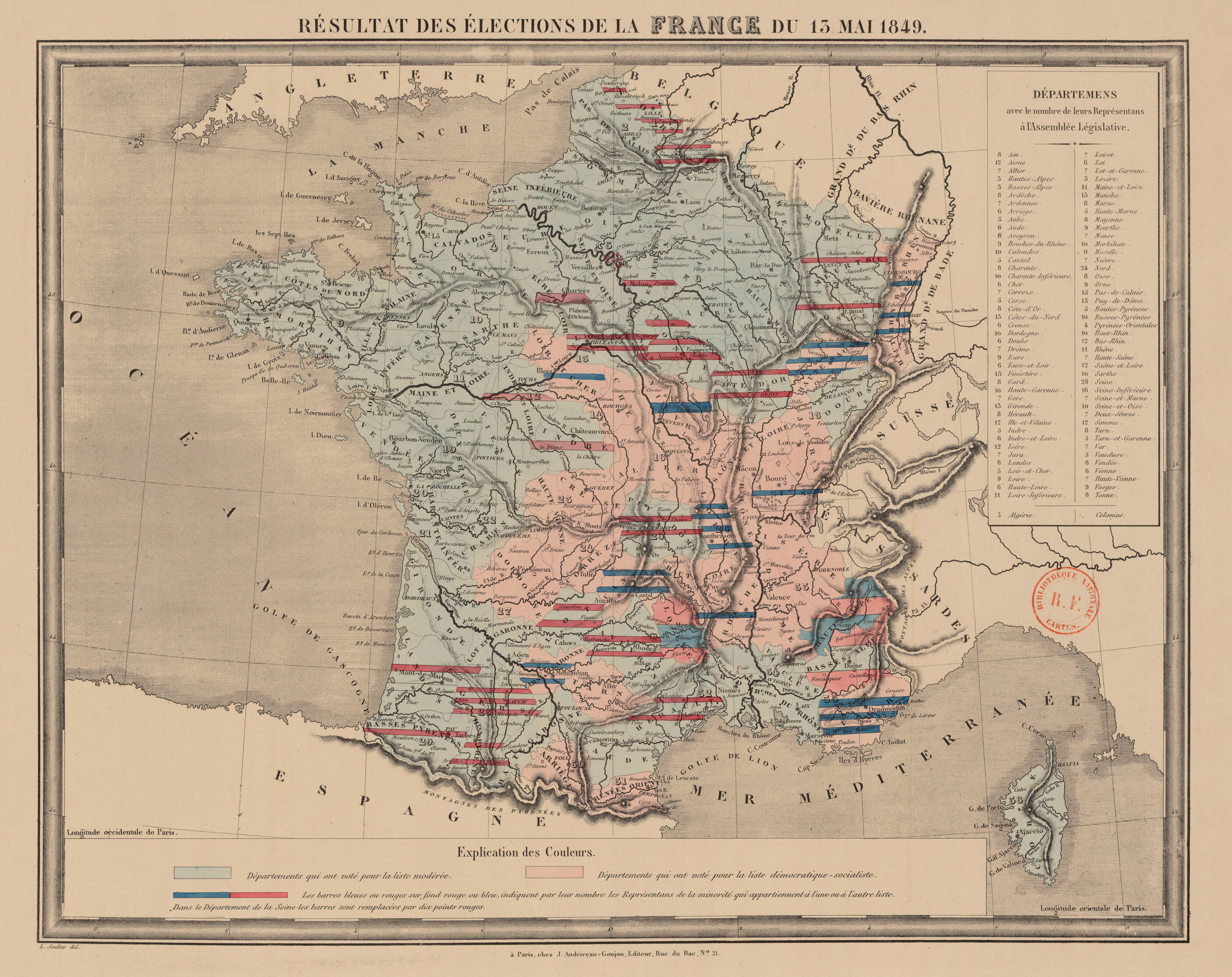
- Results by department (monarchists in blue, democratic socialists in red)
Prime Minister before election
Odilon Barrot
Party of Order
Elected Prime Minister
Alphonse Henri, comte d'Hautpoul
Party of Order

Parliamentary elections were held in France on 13 and 14 May 1849. Voters elected the first National Assembly of the Second Republic. The conservative Party of Order won an overall majority of 450 seats. The Party of Order was a bourgeois, traditionalist, and conservative party opposed to the presidency of Louis Napoleon Bonaparte and the subsequent 1851 coup.

== Results ==
Vote counts and registered voters listed below are approximate.

Party	Votes	%	Seats
Party of Order	3,310,000	50.20	450
Democratic Socialists	1,955,000	29.65	180
Constitutionalist Republicans	834,000	12.65	75
Independents and others	495,000	7.51	0
Total	6,594,000	100.00	705
Valid votes	6,594,000	97.47	
Invalid/blank votes	171,000	2.53	
Total votes	6,765,000	100.00	
Registered voters/turnout	9,936,000	68.09	
Source: Nohlen & Stöver, Rois et Presidents

=== Senegal ===
The single Senegalese seat in the National Assembly was created by decree on 5 March 1848. Following an order of 5 November 1830 and a law of 24 April 1833, all free-born people and freed slaves in Senegal had full civic and political rights, the only French African colony to give such rights until the end of World War II. The right to vote was given to all men over the age of 25 and who could prove they had lived in their municipality for the previous five years. In total 4,991 men registered to vote, up from 4,706 in the 1848 elections. Result:

Candidate	Votes	%
Barthélémy Durand Valantin	1,319	64.94
Masson	472	23.24
Petiton	240	11.82
Total	2,031	100.00
Valid votes	2,031	99.90
Invalid/blank votes	2	0.10
Total votes	2,033	100.00
Registered voters/turnout	4,991	40.73
Source: Sternberger et al., National Assembly

Incumbent MP Barthélémy Durand Valantin was re-elected with 65% of the vote. Valantin retired from politics in 1851, but before a by-election could be held, a decree of 2 February 1852 abolished Senegalese representation in the National Assembly.
