= 1852 French legislative election =

- 29 February 1852 (first round); 14 March 1852 (second round)
- Registered: 9,836,043
- Turnout: 61.30%
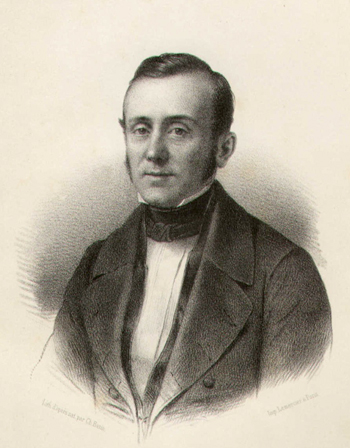

	First party	Second party	Third party
Leader	Adolphe Billault	–	–
Party	Bonapartists	Monarchists	Republican
Seats won	253	7	3
Prime Minister before election
Léon Faucher
Party of Order
Subsequent Prime Minister
François-Xavier de Casabianca
Bonapartists

Legislative elections were held in France on 29 February and 14 March 1852, electing the first legislature of the French Second Empire.

Emperor Napoleon III's Bonapartists won a huge majority consisting of 258 of the 261 seats (five Royalists allied with the Bonapartists). The Party of Order that had won a majority in the 1849 election was banned following their opposition to the 1851 coup by President Louis Napoleon Bonaparte.

== Electoral system ==
The 263 members of the Corps législatif were elected for six-year terms in single-member constituencies via the two-round system.

== Results ==
Party	Votes	%	Seats
Bonapartists			253
Monarchists			7
Republicans			3
Total			263
Total votes	6,029,564	–	
Registered voters/turnout	9,836,043	61.30	
Source: Rois et Presidents
