= Ferdinand Flocon =

French politician and journalist (1800–1866)

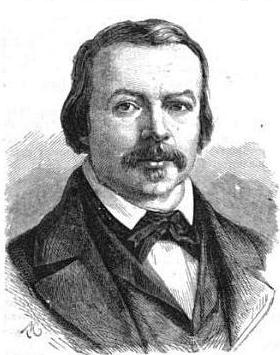
- Portrait from the Histoire populaire contemporaine de la France (1865)
- Born: 1 November 1800; Paris, France
- Died: 15 March 1866 (aged 65); Lausanne, Switzerland
- Occupations: Journalist and politician
- Known for: Member of the French Provisional Government of 1848

Ferdinand Flocon (1 November 1800 – 15 March 1866) was a French journalist and politician who was one of the founding members of the Provisional Government at the start of the French Second Republic in 1848. He was Minister of Agriculture and Commerce for the Executive Commission of 1848. He opposed Louis Napoleon and was forced into exile in the Second French Empire (1852–1870).

== Early years ==
Ferdinand Flocon was born in Paris on 1 November 1800. His father worked for the Chappe telegraph service. Flocon was committed to democracy and the republican movement in France. In the 1820s he was a member of the Carbonari. Under the July Monarchy (1830–1848) he belonged to republican secret societies. Flocon became a stenographer and parliamentary reporter for liberal newspapers. He was also a translator and novelist. He was an editor for le Courrier français. Flocon later worked for le Constitutionnel and then for La Tribune.

Flocon joined a group of republicans who prepared to overthrow the monarchy when the king died. La Réforme, founded in 1843, became the organ of this group. It promoted a more assertive line than the moderate republican Le National. The first chief editor was Éléonore-Louis Godefroi Cavaignac. Flocon took over when Cavaignac died in 1845. He published the main articles of the abolitionist Victor Schœlcher in 1846–47. He was not a socialist, but believed in organized labor and the right to work. While he was editor La Réforme published articles from Pierre-Joseph Proudhon, Mikhail Bakunin, Constantin Pecqueur, Friedrich Engels and Karl Marx.

== Second Republic ==
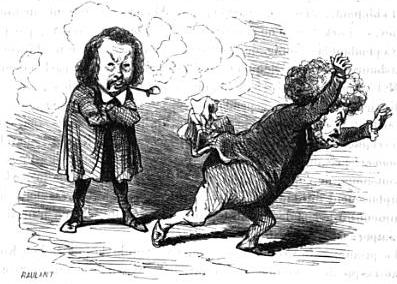
Flocon frightening Armand Marrast in 1848, by Cham

Flocon spoke on Robespierre's 1793 Declaration of the Rights of Man and of the Citizen at the banquets held before the February Revolution of 1848. From his base at La Réforme, Flocon was active during the days of the revolution, organizing and speaking. He became a member of the provisional government after the revolution had succeeded. The positions of power in the Provisional Government were mainly given to moderate republicans, although Étienne Arago was made Minister of Posts and Marc Caussidière became Prefect of Police. Alexandre Martin ("Albert"), Louis Blanc and Flocon did not get ministerial portfolios, and so had little power. Flocon was able to assist Bakunin with funds for an attempt to stir up a Polish rebellion against the Russians.

In April 1848 Flocon was elected a representative for the Seine department in the Constituent Assembly. In this election, only 285 out of 851 of the new deputies had been republicans before the February Revolution, and only six candidates of the radical republicans were elected. They were Flocon, Martin, Blanc, Caussidière, Ledru-Rollin and Agricol Perdiguier. Flocon was chosen by the Executive Committee as Minister of Commerce and Agriculture from 11 May to 28 June 1848.

Flocon was hostile to the demonstrators in the June Days Uprising (23–26 June 1848). He thought that if the uprising had succeeded it would have paved the way for an autocrat to take charge. (Note: Karl Marx and later Marxists have viewed Flocon's support of Cavaignac as a betrayal of the workers. Earlier Marx had called him "cordial and sincere . . . one of the most honest men I have known.") He supported the assignment of dictatorial power to General Louis-Eugène Cavaignac. However, he was not included in the cabinet formed by Cavaignac at the end of June 1848. After he left government, Flocon consistently voted with the left, including voting for an amnesty for the June insurgents. He failed to be reelected to the Legislative Assembly in May 1849. He moved to Strasbourg, where he edited le Démocrate du Rhin, a bi-lingual newspaper. In July 1849 Flocon ran as candidate for Representative for Montpellier, a seat that had been vacated by Ledru-Rollin. He did not campaign actively and was not elected.

== Last years ==
Flocon spoke out against 2 December 1851 coup d'état in which Louis Napoleon came to power, and was banished from France. He moved to Switzerland, where he continued to agitate for democracy and worked as a bookseller in Geneva and Lausanne. Under pressure from the French government, he was placed under house arrest in Zurich, where he lived in poverty. He died on 15 March 1866 in Lausanne.

== Works ==
- Flocon, Ferdinand; Beckhaus, A. (1824). Dictionnaire de morale jésuitique. les marchands de nouveautés.
- Aycard, Marie; Flocon, Ferdinand (1824). Salon de 1824.
- Ballades allemandes. Translation of the works of Gottfried August Bürger (1827)
- Flocon, Ferdinand (1827). Ned Wilmore, roman de moeurs. A. Udron.
- Flocon, Ferdinand (1833). Révélations sur le coup de pistolet du 19 novembre 1832, par un des accusés du complot ! ! !. Levavasseur.
- Flocon, Ferdinand (1833). Distraction. Lecointe et Pougin.
- Moleschott, Jacobus Albertus Willebrordus (1858). De l'alimentation et du régime (Lehre der Nahrungsmittel für das Volk). Translated by Flocon. V. Masson.
