= French Second Republic =

Government of France from 1848 to 1852

Coordinates: 48°49′N 2°29′E

French Republic République française
- 1848–1852
- Flag
- Motto: Liberté, Égalité, Fraternité "Liberty, Equality, Fraternity"
- Anthem: Le Chant des Girondins "The Song of Girondists"
- The French Republic in 1848
- Capital: Paris
- Official languages: French
- Religion: Roman Catholicism (Concordat of 1801); Calvinism; Lutheranism; Judaism
- Demonym: French
- Government: Unitary semi-presidential republic (1848–1851): (under a provisional government (24–26 February 1848)); Unitary presidential republic under a dictatorship (1851–1852)
- Head of state
  - February–May 1848: Jacques-Charles Dupont de l'Eure
  - May–June 1848: François Arago
  - June–December 1848: Louis-Eugène Cavaignac
  - 1848–1852: Louis-Napoleon Bonaparte
- Vice President
  - 1849–1852: Henri Georges Boulay de la Meurthe
- Prime Minister
  - 1848 (first): Jacques-Charles Dupont de l'Eure
  - 1851 (last): Léon Faucher
- Legislature: National Assembly
- History
  - February Revolution: 24 February 1848
  - Abolition of slavery: 27 April 1848
  - Constitution adopted: 4 November 1848
  - Coup d'état: 2 December 1851
  - Establishment of the Second Empire: 2 December 1852
- Currency: French franc
Preceded by	Succeeded by
Kingdom of France; Colony of Algeria	Second French Empire
- Today part of: France; Algeria

The French Second Republic (French: Deuxième république française or La II^{e} République), officially the French Republic (République française), was the second republican formation of the government of France. The republic existed from 1848, when the monarchy fell, until its dissolution only four years later in 1852 upon the proclamation of the Second French Empire.

Following the final defeat of Napoleon Bonaparte at the Battle of Waterloo in June 1815, France had been reconstituted into a monarchy known as the Bourbon Restoration. After a brief period of revolutionary turmoil in 1830, royal power was again secured in the "July Monarchy", governed under principles of moderate conservatism and improved relations with the United Kingdom.

In 1848, Europe erupted into a mass revolutionary wave in which many citizens challenged their royal leaders. Much of it was led by France in the February Revolution, overthrowing King Louis-Philippe. Radical and liberal factions of the population convened the French Second Republic in 1848. Attempting to restore the French First Republic's values on human rights and constitutional government, they adopted the motto of the First Republic; Liberté, Égalité, Fraternité. The republic was plagued with tribalist tendencies of its leading factions: royalists, proto-socialists, liberals, and conservatives. In this environment, Napoleon's nephew, Louis-Napoléon Bonaparte, established himself as a popular anti-establishment figure and was elected president in 1848.

Under the Second Republic's constitution, the president was restricted to a single term of four years. To avoid this restriction and remain in power, President Louis-Napoléon overthrew the second Republic in a process beginning with the 1851 self-coup d'état; he became known as Emperor Napoleon III of the Second French Empire from 1852.

== Revolution of 1848 ==
The variant of the French tricolor adopted in error by the provisional government between 24 February and 5 March 1848

France's "February Revolution" of 1848 was the first of the Revolutions of 1848. The events of the revolution led to the end of the 1830–1848 Orleans Monarchy and led to the creation of the Second Republic.

The July Revolution of 1830, part of a wave of similar regime changes across Europe, had put an end to the monarchy of the Bourbon Restoration and installed a more liberal constitutional monarchy under the Orleans dynasty governed predominantly by Guizot's conservative-liberal center-right and Thiers' progressive-liberal center-left.

But to the left of the dynastic parties, the monarchy was criticized by Republicans (a mixture of Radicals and socialists) for being insufficiently democratic: its electoral system was based on a narrow, privileged electorate of property owners and therefore excluded workers. During the 1840s several petitions requesting electoral reform (universal manhood suffrage) had been issued by the National Guard but had been rejected by both of the main dynastic parties. Political meetings dedicated to this issue were banned by the government, and electoral reformers therefore bypassed the ban by holding a series of 'banquets' (1847–1848), events where the political debate was disguised as dinner speeches. This movement began overseen by Odilon Barrot's moderate center-left liberal critics of Guizot's conservative government but took on a life of its own after 1846 when the economic crisis encouraged ordinary workers to demand a say over the government.

On 14 February 1848, Guizot's government decided to put an end to the banquets, on the grounds of constituting illegal political assembly. On 22 February, striking workers and Republican students took to the streets, demanding an end to Guizot's government, and erected barricades. Odilon Barrot called a motion of no confidence in Guizot, hoping that this might satisfy the rioters, but the Chamber of Deputies sided with the premier. The government called a state of emergency, thinking it could rely on the troops of the National Guard, but instead on the morning of 23 February, the Guardsmen sided with the revolutionaries, protecting them from the regular soldiers who by now had been called in.

The industrial population of the faubourgs was welcomed by the National Guard on their way toward the center of Paris. Barricades were raised after the shooting of protestors outside the Guizot manor by soldiers.

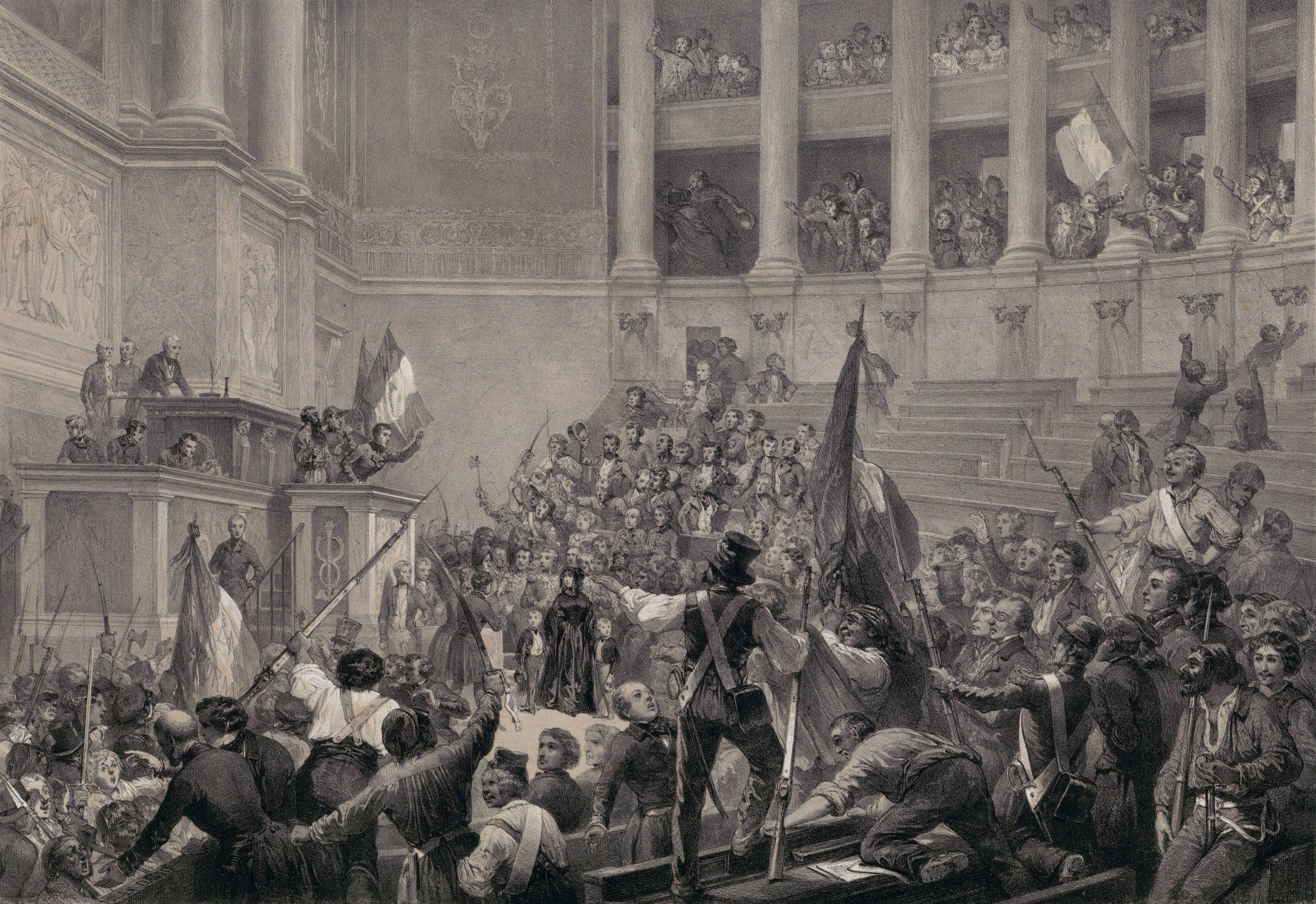
Revolutionaries storming the Chamber of Deputies on 24 February

On 23 February 1848 Premier François Guizot's cabinet resigned, abandoned by the petite bourgeoisie, on whose support they thought they could depend. The heads of the more left-leaning conservative-liberal monarchist parties, Louis-Mathieu Molé and Adolphe Thiers, declined to form a government. Odilon Barrot accepted, and Thomas Robert Bugeaud, commander-in-chief of the first military division, who had begun to attack the barricades, was recalled. In the face of the insurrection that had now taken possession of the whole capital, King Louis-Philippe abdicated in favor of his nine-year-old grandson, Prince Philippe, Count of Paris, but under pressure from insurgents who invaded the chamber of the Chamber of Deputies, leaders leaned in favor of the insurrection and prepared a provisional government; a (second) republic was then proclaimed by Alphonse de Lamartine.

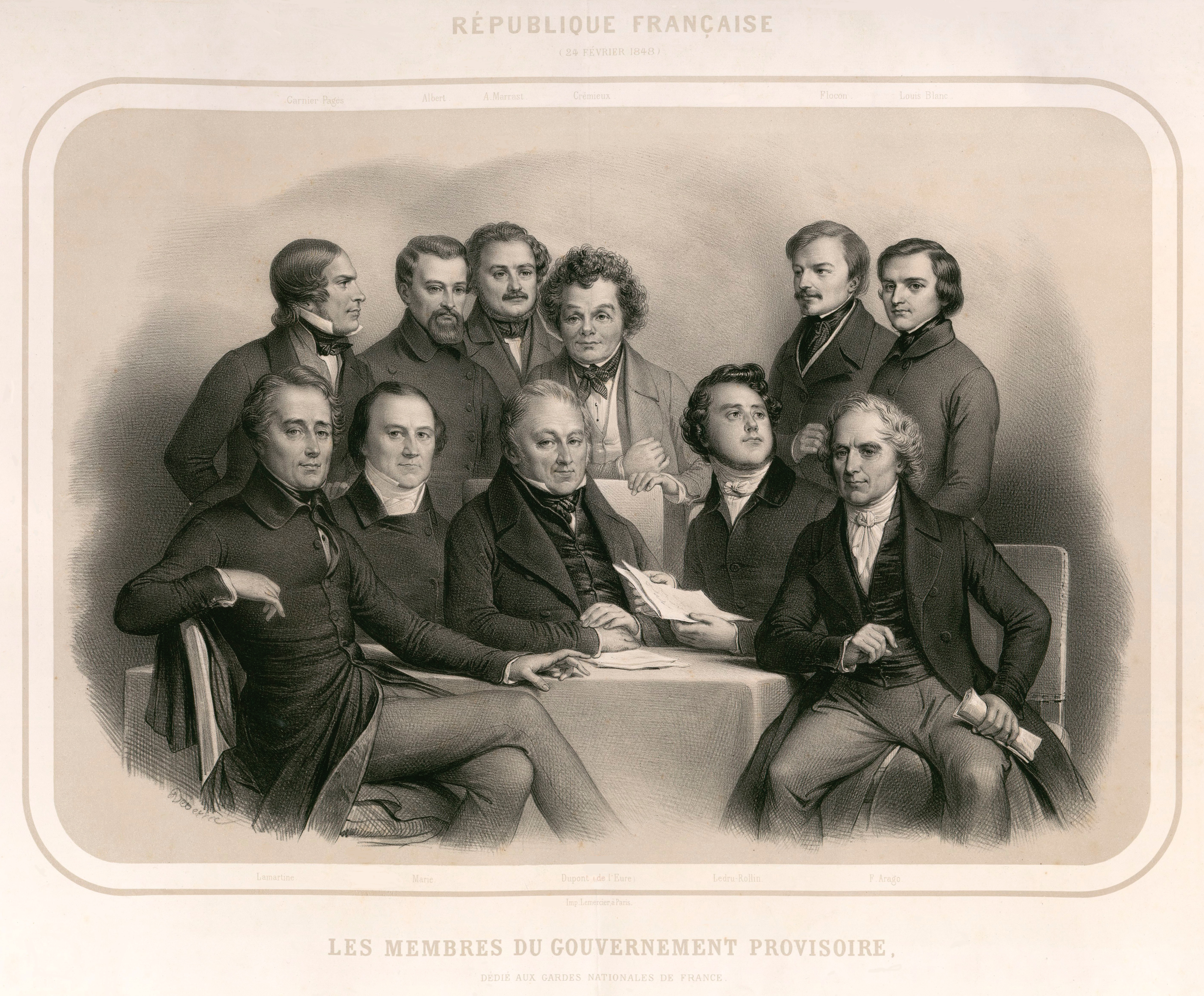
The members of the Provisional Government of 1848

The provisional government, with Dupont de l'Eure as its president, consisted of Lamartine for foreign affairs, Crémieux for justice, Ledru-Rollin for the interior, Carnot for public instruction, Goudchaux for finance, Arago for the navy, and Burdeau for war. Garnier-Pagès was made mayor of Paris.

But, in 1830, the republican-socialist party set up a rival government at the Hôtel de Ville (city hall), including Louis Blanc, Armand Marrast, Ferdinand Flocon, and Alexandre Martin, known as Albert L'Ouvrier ("Albert the Worker"), which bid fair to involve discord and civil war. But this time the Palais Bourbon was not victorious over the Hôtel de Ville. It had to consent to a fusion of the two bodies, in which, however, the predominating elements were the moderate Republicans. It was uncertain what the policy of the new government would be.

One party seeing that despite the changes in the last sixty years of all political institutions, the position of the people had not been improved, demanded a reform of society itself, the abolition of the privileged position of property, which they viewed as the only obstacle to equality, and as an emblem hoisted the red flag (the 1791 red flag was, however, the symbol not merely of the French Revolution, but rather of martial law and of order). The other party wished to maintain society on the basis of its traditional institutions, and rallied around the tricolore. As a concession made by Lamartine to popular aspirations, and in exchange for the maintaining of the tricolor flag, he conceded the Republican triptych of Liberté, Égalité, Fraternité, written on the flag, on which a red rosette was also to be added.

The first collision took place as to the form which the 1848 Revolution was to take. Lamartine wished for them to maintain their original principles, with the whole country as supreme, whereas the revolutionaries under Ledru-Rollin wished for the Republic of Paris to hold a monopoly on political power. On 5 March the government, under the pressure of the Parisian clubs, decided in favor of an immediate reference to the people, and direct universal suffrage, and adjourned it until 26 April. This added the uneducated masses to the electorate and led to the election of the Constituent Assembly on 4 May 1848. The provisional government having resigned, the republican and anti-socialist majority on 9 May entrusted the supreme power to an Executive Commission consisting of five members: Arago, Pierre Marie de Saint-Georges, Garnier-Pagès, Lamartine, and Ledru-Rollin.

The result of the general election, the return of a predominantly moderate, if not monarchical, constituent assembly dashed the hopes of those who had looked for the establishment, by a peaceful revolution, of their ideal socialist state. but they were not prepared to yield without a struggle, and in Paris itself they commanded a formidable force. In spite of the preponderance of the "tricolor" party in the provisional government, so long as the voice of France had not spoken, the socialists, supported by the Parisian proletariat, had exercised an influence on policy disproportionate to their relative numbers. By the decree of 24 February, the provisional government had solemnly accepted the principle of the "right to work", and decided to establish "National Workshops" for the unemployed; at the same time, a sort of industrial parliament was established at the Luxembourg Palace, under the presidency of Louis Blanc, with the object of preparing a scheme for the organization of labor; and, lastly, by the decree of 8 March, the property qualification for enrolment in the National Guard had been abolished and the workmen were supplied with arms. The socialists thus formed a sort of state-within-a-state, complete with a government and an armed force.

== 1848 uprisings ==
On 15 May, an armed mob, headed by François-Vincent Raspail, Auguste Blanqui, and Armand Barbès, and assisted by the proletariat-aligned Guard, attempted to overwhelm the Assembly, but were defeated by the bourgeois-aligned battalions of the National Guard. Meanwhile, the national workshops were unable to provide remunerative work for the genuine unemployed, and of the thousands who applied, the greater number were employed in aimless digging and refilling of trenches; soon even this expedient failed, and those for whom work could not be invented were given a half wage of 1 franc a day.

On 21 June, Alfred de Falloux decided in the name of the parliamentary commission on labour that the workmen should be discharged within three days and those who were able-bodied should be forced to enlist in the armed forces.

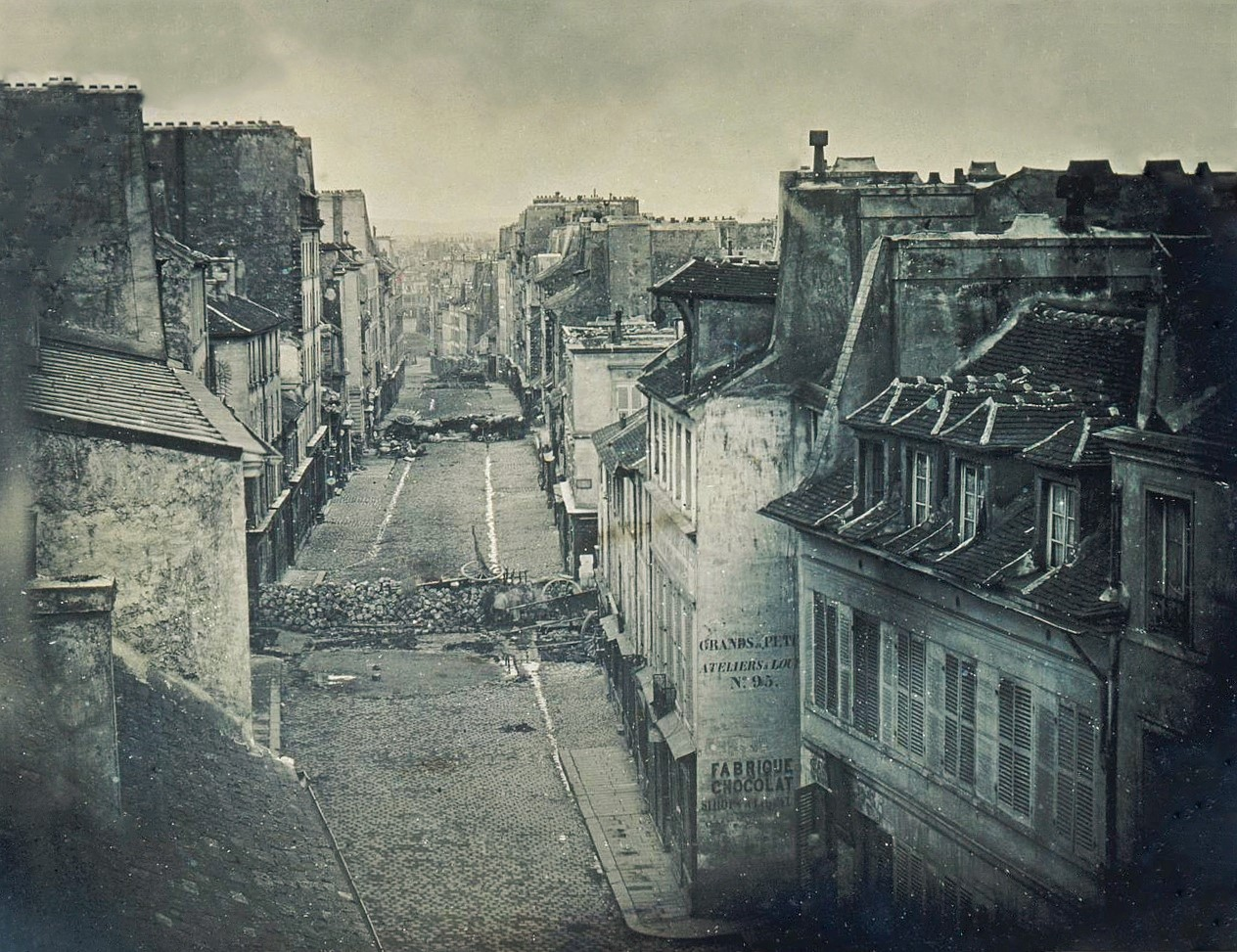
Barricades on rue Faubourg-du-Temple, 25 June 1848. These are the first barricades ever photographed

After this, the June Days uprising broke out, over the course of 24–26 June, when the eastern industrial quarter of Paris, led by the worker Louis Pujol, fought the western quarter, led by general Louis-Eugène Cavaignac, who had been appointed military dictator. The socialist party was defeated and afterwards its members were deported. But the republic had been discredited and had already become unpopular with both the peasants, who were exasperated by the new land tax of 45 centimes imposed in order to fill the empty treasury, and with the bourgeoisie, who were intimidated by the power of the revolutionary clubs and disadvantaged by the economic stagnation. By the "riots" of the June Days, the working classes were also alienated from it. The Duke of Wellington wrote at this time, "France needs a Napoleon! I cannot yet see him..." The granting of universal suffrage to a society with Imperialist sympathies would benefit reactionaries, which culminated in the election of Louis-Napoléon Bonaparte as president of the republic.

== Constitution ==
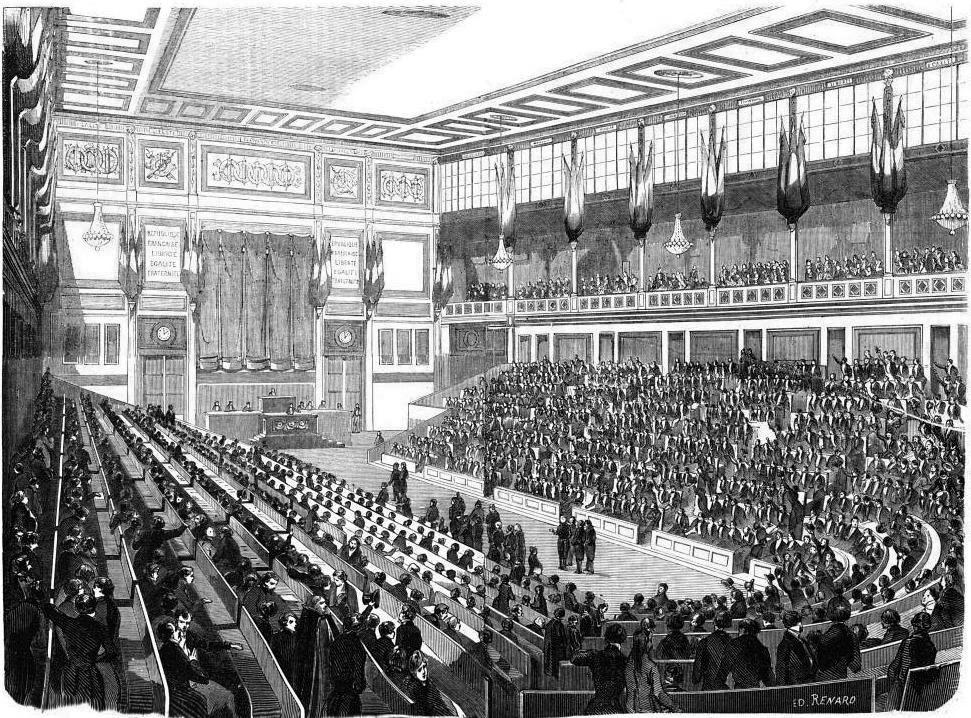
The chamber of the National Assembly of the Second Republic, in 1848

The new constitution, proclaiming a democratic republic, direct universal suffrage, and the separation of powers, was promulgated on 4 November 1848. Under the new constitution, there was to be a single permanent Assembly of 750 members elected for a term of three years by the scrutin de liste. The Assembly would elect members of a Council of State to serve for six years. Laws would be proposed by the Council of State, to be voted on by the Assembly.

The executive power was delegated to the president, who was elected for four years by direct universal suffrage, i.e. on a broader basis than that of the Assembly, and was not eligible for re-election. He was to choose his ministers, who, like him, would be responsible to the Assembly.

Revision of this constitution was made practically impossible: it involved obtaining three times in succession a majority of three-quarters of the deputies in a special assembly. It was in vain that Jules Grévy—on behalf of those who perceived the obvious and inevitable risk of creating, under the name of a president, a monarch and indeed one who was more than a king at that—proposed that the head of the state should be no more than a removable president of the ministerial council. Lamartine, thinking that he was sure to be the choice of the electors under universal suffrage, won over the support of the Chamber, which did not even take the precaution of rendering ineligible the members of families which had reigned over France. It made the presidency an office dependent upon popular acclamation.

== Presidential election of 1848 ==
The election was keenly contested; the democratic republicans adopted as their candidate Ledru-Rollin, the "pure republicans" Cavaignac, and the recently reorganized Imperialist party Prince Louis-Napoléon Bonaparte. Unknown in 1835, and forgotten or despised since 1840, Louis Napoleon had in the last eight years advanced sufficiently in the public estimation to be elected to the Constituent Assembly in 1848 by five departments. He owed this rapid increase of popularity partly to blunders of the government of July, which had unwisely aroused the memory of the country, filled as it was with recollections of the Empire, and partly to Louis Napoléon's campaign carried on by means of pamphlets of socialistic tendencies. Moreover, the monarchists, led by Thiers and the committee of the Rue de Poitiers, were no longer content even with the safe dictatorship of the upright Cavaignac, and joined forces with the Bonapartists. On 10 December the peasants gave over 5,000,000 votes to a name: Napoléon, which stood for order at all costs, against 1,400,000 for Cavaignac. Henri Georges Boulay de la Meurthe was elected vice president, a unique position in French history.

== Presidency of Louis Napoléon ==
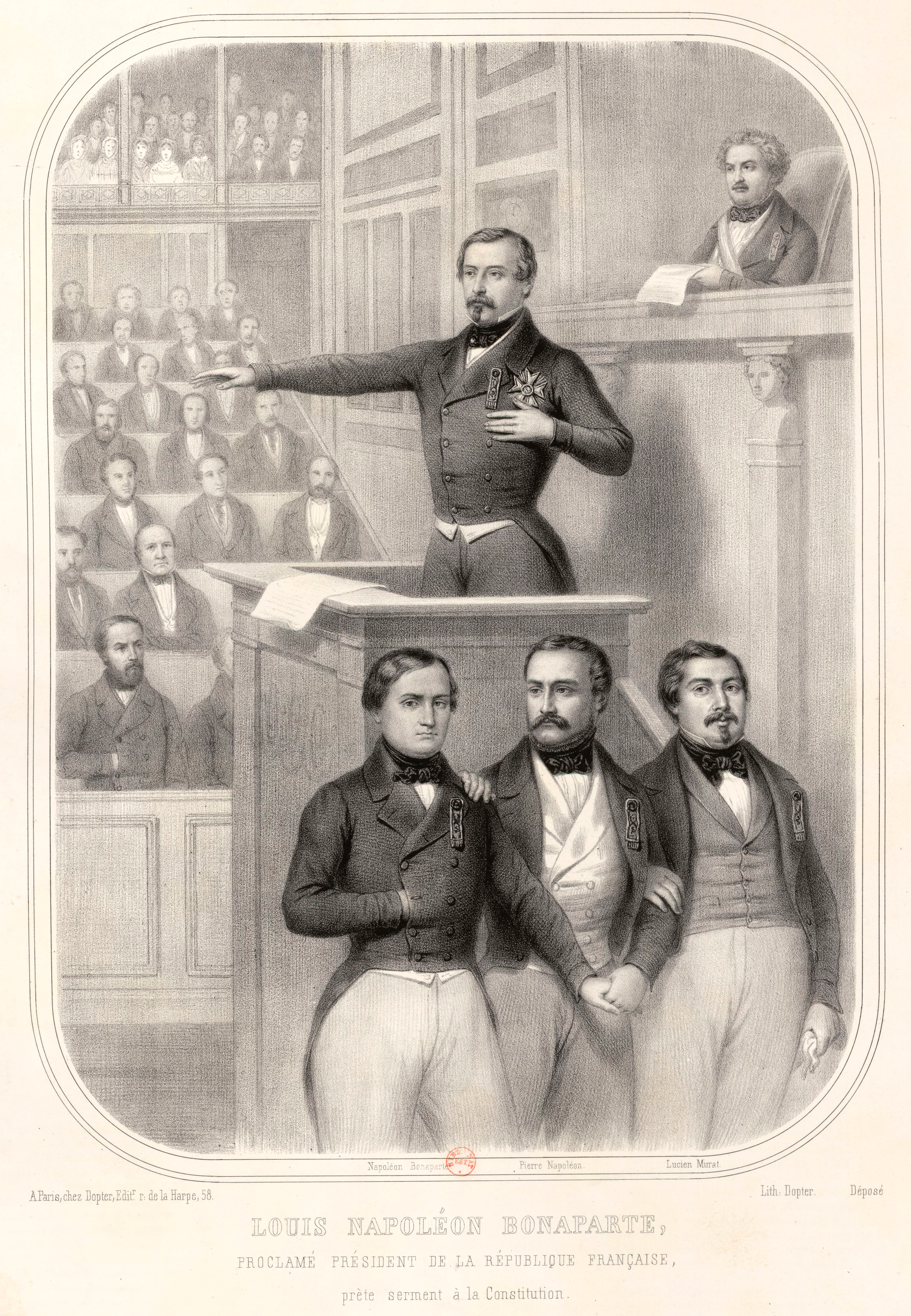
Louis Napoléon Bonaparte taking the oath of office upon being elected president

For three years, there was an indecisive struggle between the heterogeneous Assembly and the president, who was silently awaiting his opportunity. He chose as his ministers men with little inclination towards republicanism, with a preference for Orléanists, the chief of whom was Odilon Barrot. In order to strengthen his position, he endeavoured to conciliate the reactionary parties, without committing himself to any of them. The chief instance of this was the expedition to Rome voted by the Catholics, to restore the temporal authority of Pope Pius IX, who had fled Rome in fear of the nationalists and republicans. (Garibaldi and Mazzini had been elected to a Constitutional Assembly.) The pope called for international intervention to restore him in his temporal power. The French president moved to establish the power and prestige of France against that of Austria, as beginning the work of European renovation and reconstruction which he already looked upon as his mission. French troops under Oudinot marched into Rome. This provoked an insurrection in Paris in favour of the Roman Republic, that of the Château d'Eau, which was crushed on 13 June 1849. On the other hand, when the pope, though only just restored, began to yield to the general movement of reaction, the president demanded that he should set up a Liberal government. The pope's dilatory reply having been accepted by the French ministry, the president replaced it on 1 November, by the Fould-Rocher cabinet.

This looked like a declaration of war against the Catholic and monarchist majority in the Legislative Assembly, which had been elected on 28 May in a moment of panic. But the president again pretended to be playing the game of the Orléanists, as he had done in the case of the Constituent Assembly. The complementary elections of March and April 1850 resulted in an unexpected victory for the republicans which alarmed the conservative leaders, Thiers, Berryer and Montalembert. The president and the Assembly co-operated in the passage of the Loi Falloux of 15 March 1850, which again placed university instruction under the direction of the Church.

A conservative electoral law was passed on 31 May. It required each voter to prove three years' residence at his current address by way of entries in the record of direct taxes. This effectively repealed universal suffrage: factory workers, who moved fairly often, were thus disenfranchised. The law of 16 July aggravated the severity of the press restrictions by re-establishing the "caution money" (cautionnement) deposited by proprietors and editors of papers with the government as a guarantee of good behaviour. Finally, an interpretation of the law on clubs and political societies suppressed about this time all the republican societies.

== Coup d'état and end of the Second Republic ==
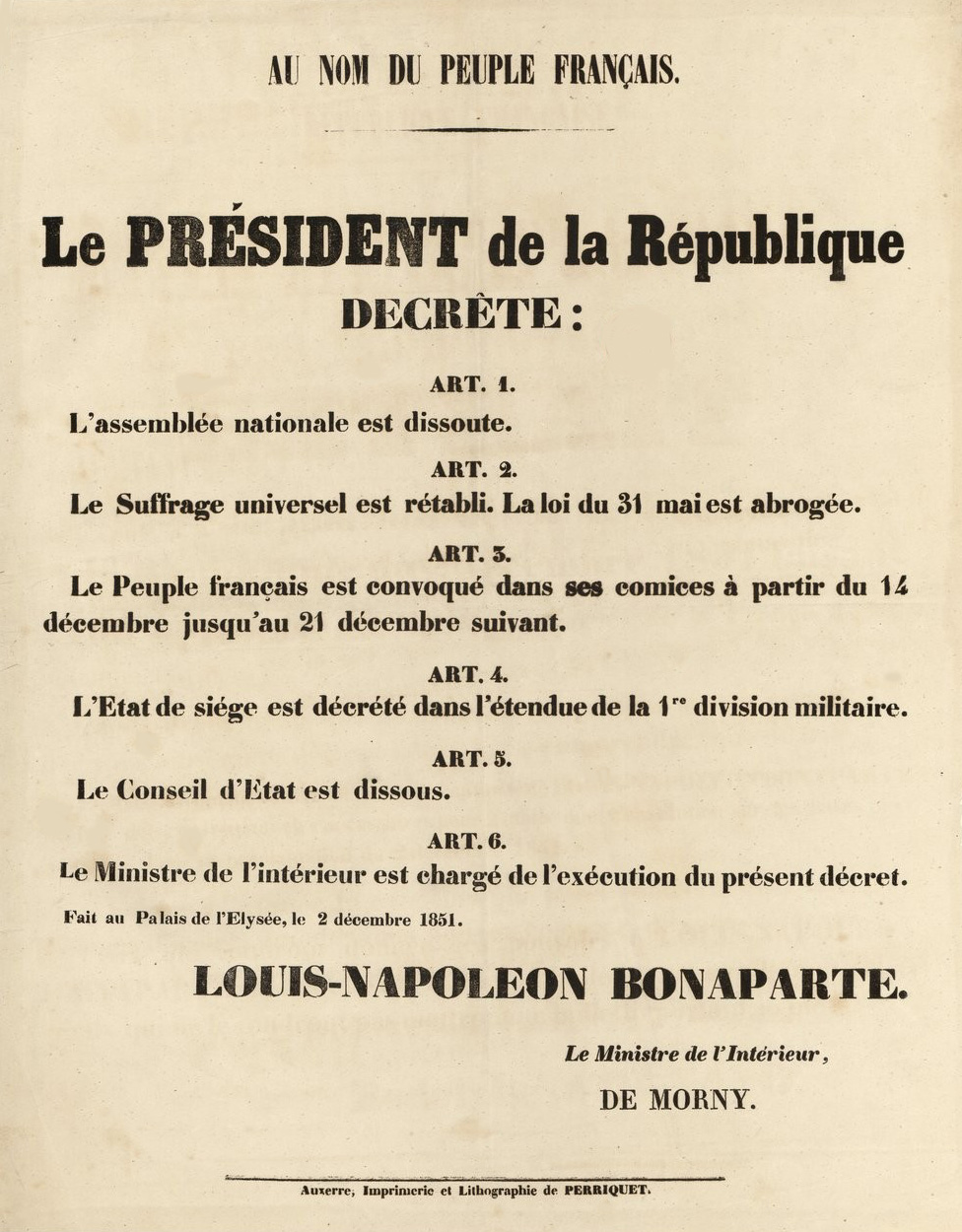
The presidential decree announcing the 1851 coup d'etat

The president had only joined the cry of "Down with the Republicans!" in Montalembert in the hope of effecting a revision of the constitution without having recourse to a coup d'état. His concessions only increased the boldness of the monarchists, who had only accepted Louis-Napoléon as president in opposition to the Republic and as a step in the direction of the monarchy. A conflict was now inevitable between his personal policy and the majority of the Chamber, who were divided into legitimists and Orléanists in spite of the death of Louis-Philippe in August 1850.

Louis-Napoléon exploited their projects for a restoration of the monarchy, which he knew to be unpopular in the country, and which gave him the opportunity of furthering his own personal ambitions. From 8 August to 12 November 1850 he went about France stating the case for a revision of the constitution in speeches which he varied according to each place; he held reviews, at which cries of "Vive Napoléon!" showed that the army was with him; he superseded General Changarnier, on whose arms the parliament relied for the projected monarchical coup d'état; he replaced his Orléanist ministry with obscure men devoted to his own cause, such as Morny, Fleury and Persigny, and gathered round him officers of the African army, broken men like General Saint-Arnaud; in fact he practically declared open war.

His reply to the votes of censure passed by the Assembly, and their refusal to increase his civil list was to hint at a vast communistic plot in order to scare the bourgeoisie, and to denounce the electoral law of 31 May 1850, in order to gain the support of the mass of the people. The Assembly retaliated by throwing out the proposal for a partial reform of that article of the constitution which prohibited the re-election of the president and the re-establishment of universal suffrage (July). All hope of a peaceful issue was at an end. When the questors called upon the Chamber to have posted in all barracks the decree of 6 May 1848 concerning the right of the Assembly to demand the support of the troops if attacked, the Mountain, dreading a restoration of the monarchy, voted with the Bonapartists against the measure, thus disarming the legislative power.

Louis-Napoléon saw his opportunity, and organised the French coup of 1851. On the night of 1/2 December 1851, the anniversary of his uncle Napoleon's coronation in 1804 and his victory at Austerlitz in 1805, he dissolved the Chamber, re-established universal suffrage, had all the party leaders arrested, and summoned a new assembly to prolong his term of office for ten years. The deputies who had met under Berryer at the Mairie of the 10th arrondissement to defend the constitution and proclaim the deposition of Louis Napoleon were scattered by the troops at Mazas and Mont Valérien. The resistance organized by the republicans within Paris under Victor Hugo was soon subdued by the intoxicated soldiers. The more serious resistance in the départements was crushed by declaring a state of siege and by the "mixed commissions". The plebiscite of 20 December ratified by a huge majority the coup d'état in favour of the prince-president, who alone reaped the benefit of the excesses of the Republicans and the reactionary passions of the monarchists.

== See also ==
- French Africa
- Revolutions of 1848
- French Freemasonry under the Second Republic
