= French Provisional Government of 1848 =

Interim government of the French Second Republic in 1848

Provisional government of 1848
- France; Cabinet of France
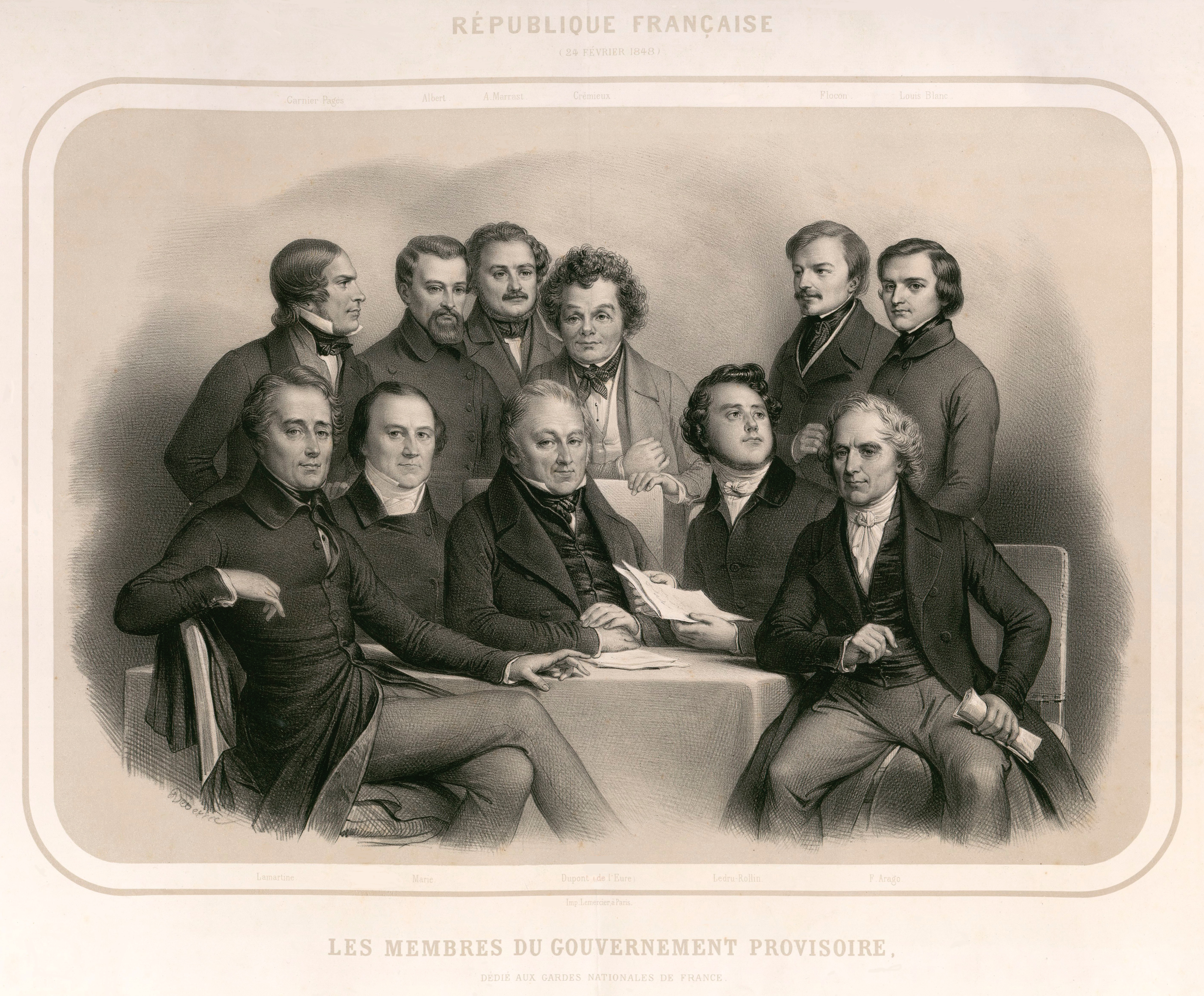
- The members of the Provisional Government, by Achille Devéria
- Date formed: 24 February 1848
- Date dissolved: 9 May 1848

People and organisations
- Head of state: Louis Philippe II (claimant); Jacques-Charles Dupont de l'Eure
- Head of government: Jacques-Charles Dupont de l'Eure

History
- Predecessor: Cabinet of François-Pierre Guizot
- Successor: Executive Commission of 1848

The Provisional government was the first government of the French Second Republic, formed on 24 February 1848 following the abolition of the July Monarchy by the February Revolution. The provisional government was succeeded on 9 May 1848 by the Executive Commission.

== Formation ==
The Provisional Government was formed after three days of street fighting in Paris that ended in the abdication of King Louis Philippe I at noon on February 24. The leaders of the government were selected by acclamation in two different meetings later that day, one at the Chamber of Deputies and the other at the Hôtel de Ville. The first set of seven names, chosen at the Chamber of Deputies, came from the list of deputies made by the moderate republican paper Le National. The second set of names, chosen at the Hôtel de Ville, came from a list made by the more radical republican paper La Réforme. In addition to the first set of deputies it included three journalists and a representative of the workers. Later that evening the combined list was acclaimed at the Hôtel de Ville.

The members of the new Provisional Government collectively acted as head of state. They included the former deputies Jacques-Charles Dupont de l'Eure, Alphonse de Lamartine, Adolphe Crémieux, François Arago, Alexandre Auguste Ledru-Rollin, Louis-Antoine Garnier-Pagès and Pierre Marie de Saint-Georges. The three journalists were Armand Marrast, Louis Blanc (a socialist) and Ferdinand Flocon. The representative of the workers was Alexandre Martin, known as "Albert".

== Policies ==
Various reforms were carried out during the Provisional Government's time in office. The old trade guilds were replaced (for purposes of conciliation) by organisations of employers and workers, while the undercutting of wages by various institutions like prisons was forbidden. In addition, as noted by one study, “the community accepted responsibility for industrial accidents, the Tuileries being set aside as a hospital for this purpose.” Imprisonment for debt was also abolished. A decree of March 1848 abolished “marchandage;” a subcontracting process that (as noted by one study) “encouraged competitive bidding between small entrepreneurs and forced down wages.” Another decree limited the working hours of adult males, while under another, as noted by one study, “the taxes on salt and other articles of consumption were remitted.”

== Ministers ==
Like its successor, the Executive Commission, the provisional government had a collective leadership, that exercised the power of head of state (French: Chief d'état) for all its duration.

The positions of power in the Provisional Government were mainly given to moderate republicans, although Étienne Arago was made Minister of Posts and Marc Caussidière became Prefect of Police. Alexandre Martin ("Albert"), Louis Blanc and Ferdinand Flocon did not get ministerial portfolios, and so had little power. The ministers were:

Portfolio	Holder	Party
President of the Council of Ministers	Jacques Charles Dupont	Moderate Republican
Minister of Foreign Affairs	Alphonse de Lamartine	Moderate Republican
Minister of the Interior	Alexandre Ledru-Rollin	Radical Republican
Minister of Justice	Adolphe Crémieux	Moderate Republican
Minister of Finance	Michel Goudchaux	Moderate Republican
Minister of Public Works	Pierre Marie de Saint-Georges	Moderate Republican
Minister of Trade and Agriculture	Eugène Bethmont	Moderate Republican
Minister of Education	Hippolyte Carnot	Moderate Republican
Minister of War	Jacques Gerbais de Subervie	Military
Minister of the Navy and Colonies	François Arago	Moderate Republican
Ministers of State	Louis-Antoine Garnier-Pagès	Moderate Republican
Ministers of State	Armand Marrast	Radical Republican
Ministers of State	Ferdinand Flocon	Radical Republican
Ministers of State	Louis Blanc	Socialist Republican
Ministers of State	Alexandre Martin	Socialist Republican

Changes

- On 5 March 1848, Louis-Antoine Garnier-Pagès succeeded Michel Goudchaux as Finance Minister.
- On 20 March 1848, General Eugène Cavaignac succeeded Jacques Gerbais de Subervie was War Minister.
- On 5 April 1848, François Arago succeeded General Cavaignac as War Minister.

== Key events ==
February 24:	Revolution in Paris; Abdication of Louis Philippe I; Formation of the Provisional Government
25:	Alphonse de Lamartine opposes the adoption of the red flag; Mobile National Guard created; Decrees concerning the right to work and the creation of workers' associations
26:	Creation of the National Workshops; Abolition of the death penalty for political offenses
28:	Demonstration of public works and buildings workers in the place de l'Hôtel-de-Ville, Paris, to demand a Ministry of Labor and the 10-hour day; Creation of the Government Commission for workers headed by Louis Blanc, which implements the national workshops
29:	Suppression of the Octroi and salt taxes
March 2:	Abolition of the system of bargaining for hiring; Reduction of hours in the working day
4:	Creation of the commission to implement abolition of slavery in the French colonies; Decision not to intervene on behalf of other European peoples revolting against their governments
5:	Universal suffrage decreed for males; Convocation of a constituent assembly decided, with elections set for 9 April; Forced used of banknotes to prevent disappearance of the gold holdings of the Bank of France
7:	Reopening of the Paris Stock Exchange (closed from 22 February)
8:	National Guard opened to all citizens; Creation of a school of administration to train officials
9:	Abolition of imprisonment for debt
12:	Abolition of corporal punishment in criminal matters
13-18:	Revolution in Berlin
14:	Elite units of the National Guard abolished
16:	Establishment by Louis-Antoine Garnier-Pagès of a 45 centimes tax, unpopular in rural areas
17:	Workers demonstration in Paris for postponement of the election of the Constituent Assembly. Elections postponed to April 23.
21:	Revolt in Bordeaux against envoys of the provisional government
23:	Creation of the Central Workers Committee of the department of Seine
30:	Failure of the expedition of the Belgian Legion in Belgium
April 3:	Revolt in Valence against envoys of the Provisional Government; Failure of the Voraces Legion of Lyon to raise Savoy
5:	Revolt in Besançon against envoys of the provisional government
16:	Failure of the Paris demonstration for a further postponement of the election of the Constituent Assembly
23:	Moderate success in elections to the National Assembly
27-28:	Street fighting in Rouen between supporters of the defeated Democratic Republicans and those elected from the bourgeois list
27:	Abolition of slavery in French colonies
29:	Louis-Eugène Cavaignac appointed governor of Algeria
May 4:	First meeting of the National Assembly; Assembly unanimously proclamats the Republic
6:	Election by the Assembly of a new government: the Executive Commission

== Sources ==
- Agulhon, Maurice (1 September 1983). The Republican Experiment, 1848-1852. Cambridge University Press. ISBN 978-0-521-28988-7.
- Augello, Massimo M.; Guidi, Marco Enrico Luigi (1 January 2005). Economists in Parliament in the Liberal Age (1848-1920). Ashgate. ISBN 978-0-7546-3965-7.
- Hayat, Samuel (2014). Quand la République était révolutionnaire. Citoyenneté et représentation en 1848 (in French). Paris: Seuil. pp. 71–82, 119–130. ISBN 978-2-02-113639-5.
- Fortescue, William (2 August 2004). France and 1848: The End of Monarchy. Routledge. ISBN 978-1-134-37923-1.
- Lamartine, Alphonse de (1890). Lamartine's works ... G. Bell & sons.
- Luna, Frederick de (17 October 2004). "Provisional Government of the Second French Republic".
