= Pierre Marie de Saint-Georges =

French politician (1795–1870)

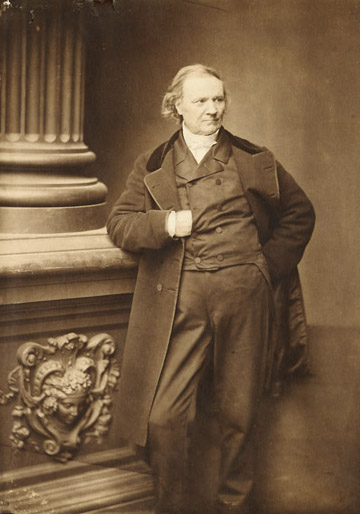
Pierre Marie de Saint-Georges by Antoine Samuel Adam-Salomon circa 1850

Alexandre-Pierre-Thomas-Amable Marie de Saint Georges (15 February 1795 – 28 April 1870), better known as Pierre Marie de Saint-Georges, was a French politician who served as French Head of State from 6 May until 28 June 1848.

Marie was born in Yonne on 15 February 1795 and entered public life as a lawyer under the Restoration. He was elected to the Chamber of Deputies in 1842 and held the seat until the February Revolution.

He became Minister of Public Works in the Provisional Government in 1848, but was forced out in May of that year. Marie was elected to the Executive Commission and became President of the National Assembly during June 1848. He was then made Minister of Justice in July 1848 and held the post till December 1848. Marie retired in May 1849 and retired to private life for over a decade. He returned briefly to politics between 1863 and 1869 as a left-wing member of the Legislative Corps (Second French Empire).

Political offices
Preceded by Jacques-Charles Dupont de l'Eure; Chairman of the Provisional Government of the French Republic	Head of State of France; 6 May 1848 – 28 June 1848; Member of the Executive Commission along with: François Arago; Louis-Antoine Garnier-Pagès; Alphonse de Lamartine; Alexandre Ledru-Rollin	Succeeded by Louis-Eugène Cavaignac; President of the Council of Ministers
