= Louis-Eugène Cavaignac =

French general and politician (1802–1857)

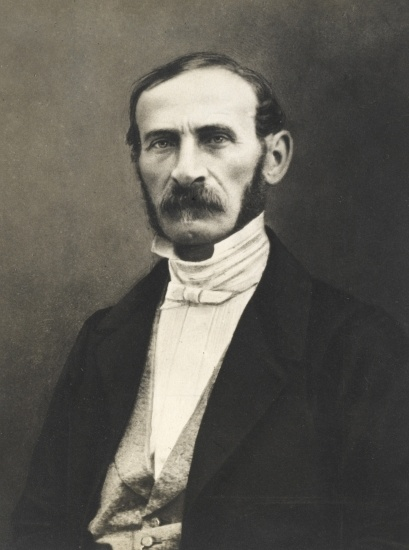
- Portrait by Pierre Petit, c. 1850s

Chief of the Executive Power
- In office 28 June 1848 – 20 December 1848
- Preceded by: François Arago (as President of the Executive Commission)
- Succeeded by: Louis-Napoléon Bonaparte (as President of France)

Minister of War
- In office 17 May 1848 – 29 June 1848
- President: François Arago
- Preceded by: Jean-Baptiste-Adolphe Charras
- Succeeded by: Louis Juchault de Lamoricière
- In office 20 March 1848 – 5 April 1848
- President: Jacques-Charles Dupont de l'Eure
- Preceded by: Jacques Gervais Subervie
- Succeeded by: François Arago

Governor of Algeria
- In office 24 February 1848 – 29 April 1848
- President: Jacques-Charles Dupont de l'Eure
- Preceded by: Henri d'Orléans
- Succeeded by: Nicolas Changarnier

Personal details
- Born: 15 October 1802 Paris, French Republic
- Died: 28 October 1857 (aged 55) Flée, French Empire
- Resting place: Montmartre Cemetery
- Party: Moderate Republicans
- Relations: Jean-Baptiste Cavaignac (father); Jacques-Marie Cavaignac (uncle); Godefroi Cavaignac (brother); Jacques Marie Eugène Godefroy Cavaignac (son)
- Awards: Commander of the Legion of Honour

Military service
- Allegiance: Kingdom of France; July Monarchy; French Second Republic
- Branch/service: Army
- Years of service: 1822–1852
- Rank: General of division
- Battles/wars: Greek War of Independence; Morea expedition; French conquest of Algeria; June Days uprising

Louis-Eugène Cavaignac (French: [lwi øʒɛn kavɛɲak]; 15 October 1802 – 28 October 1857) was a French general and politician who served as head of the executive power of France from June to December 1848, during the French Second Republic.

Born in Paris to a prominent family, Cavaignac was educated for a military career. Shortly after returning from service in the Morea expedition he took part in the July Revolution, and in 1832 was sent to Algeria, at the start of the French invasion, where he served with distinction for the next 16 years. He started his political career following the French Revolution of 1848 and the establishment of the Second Republic, being elected member of the National Assembly, and soon became one of the leaders of the Moderate Republicans.

As Minister of War in the French provisional government, Cavaignac was tasked with putting down the June Days uprising, a revolt by Parisian workers against the National Assembly, and for this was temporarily given emergency powers. After suppressing the insurrection he renounced his dictatorial powers, and was subsequently confirmed by the National Assembly as the provisional "Chief of the Executive Power" of France, governing for nearly six months until the 1848 presidential election, in which he ran but lost to Louis-Napoléon Bonaparte. He continued to serve as a representative in the National Assembly until its dissolution by the president during the 1851 coup d'état, and afterwards retired into private life.

== Family and early life ==
Cavaignac was born in Paris on 15 October 1802, the second and last child of Jean-Baptiste Cavaignac (1762–1829) and Julie-Marie de Corancez (1780–1849), who were married in 1797. His elder brother was the republican activist and journalist Éléonore-Louis Godefroi Cavaignac. At the time of his birth, his father was the mayor of Saint-Sauveur, and previously during the French Revolution had been a Jacobin member of the National Convention, where he voted for the execution of Louis XVI. His mother was the member of a wealthy family, prominent in the liberal intellectual circles of Paris, being the daughter of Guillaume Olivier de Corancez, founder of the Journal de Paris and a friend of Jean-Jacques Rousseau. Through his mother, Cavaignac was a great-grandson of the Genevan encyclopédiste Jean Romilly. He and his brother were raised in accordance with the principles established in Rousseau's Emile, or On Education.

Cavaignac entered the École Polytechnique in 1820, then two years left to continue his studies in Metz. Having finished his military education, he joined the Royal Army as a sub-lieutenant of the 2nd regiment of military engineers. Promoted to lieutenant in 1826, he served between 1828 and 1829 in the Morea expedition, the French intervention in the Greek War of Independence. In 1830, upon the outbreak of the July Revolution, Cavaignac, who was stationed in Arras, became one of the first officers to join the revolt against the Bourbon monarchy. He was then promoted to captain in October 1830, under the new July Monarchy.

== Military career ==
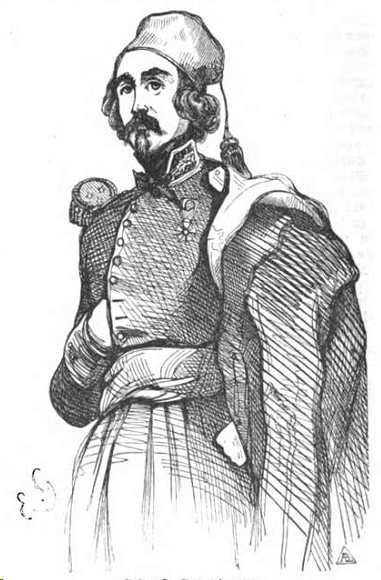
"Colonel Cavaignac", portrait published in the Illustrirte Zeitung in 1843; Cavaignac wears a fez, at the time commonly worn by French troops in North Africa

In 1831, Cavaignac was removed from active duty in consequence of his declared republicanism, after he responded negatively to his colonel when questioned if he would obey orders to fight an eventual republican insurrection. He was recalled in 1832 and deployed with the Army of Africa, to serve in the invasion of Algeria. In the first years of the campaign he saw action at Oran (1833), Mascara (1834) and Tlemcen (1836), which earned him praise from his commanding officer, Thomas Bugeaud, who described Cavaignac as "an instructed officer", whose "high capabilities" made him "ready for great things". In April 1837 he was given command of a battalion of zouaves, and later won special distinction in his fifteen months' command of the exposed garrison of Tlemcen, a command for which he was selected by Marshal Clauzel, and in the defence of Cherchell in 1840.

In his biography of Cavaignac, Hippolyte Castille remarked that "those who had known general Cavaignac in the battlefield knew what intelligence and energy he deployed in action". Almost every step of his promotion was gained on the field of battle. He was promoted to lieutenant-colonel in June 1840, to colonel in August 1841, and to maréchal de camp in 1844, the latter on the request of Henri d'Orléans, Duke of Aumale himself, son of King Louis Philippe. As he rose through the ranks in Algeria, Cavaignac's correspondence with the republicans in France became increasingly rare. In the last years of the July Monarchy, Cavaignac was appointed governor of the province of Oran, replacing general Lamoricière.

== Early political career ==
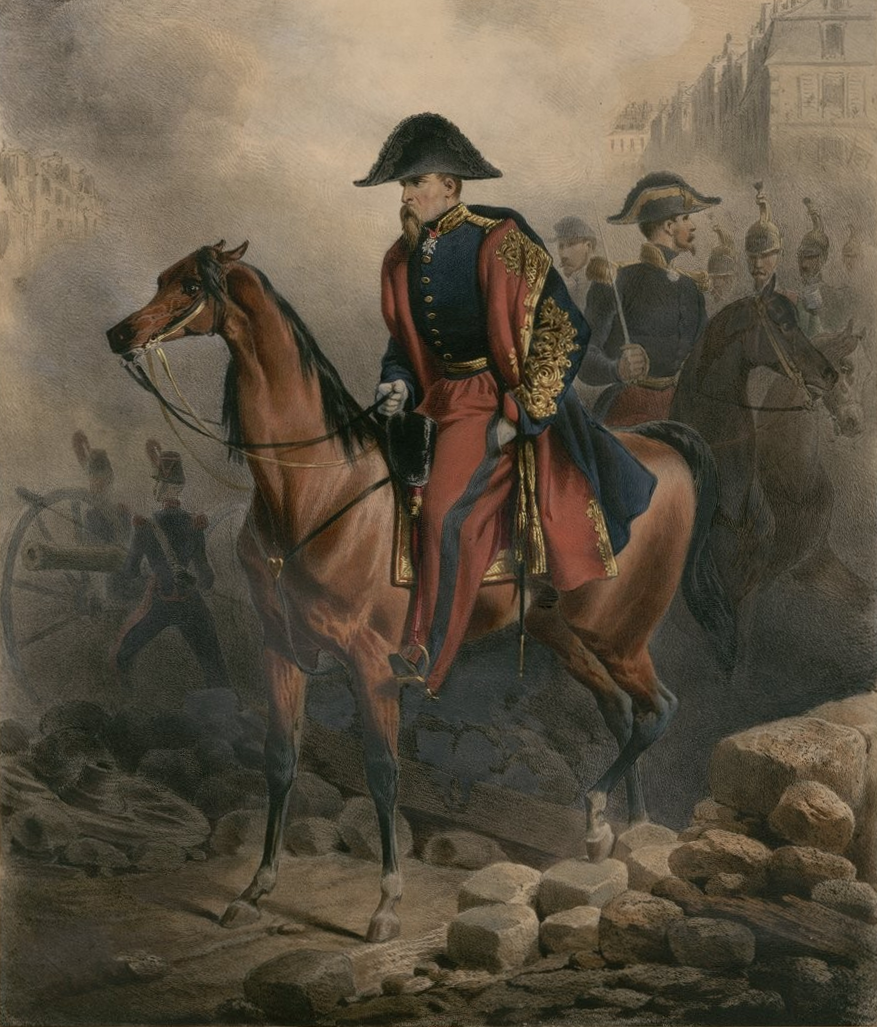
Equestrian portrait by Ange-Louis Janet

Following the February 1848 Revolution and the creation of the Republic, Cavaignac was promoted to general of division and was appointed Governor General of Algeria by the French provisional government, succeeding the Duke of Aumale. On 20 March he was offered the office of Minister of War, but refused it in a letter addressed to the provisional government from Algiers, on 27 March. About a month later, Cavaignac returned to France to take his seat as a representative of Lot to the constituent National Assembly, after being the most voted in that department on the 1848 legislative election.

Cavaignac arrived in Paris on 17 May 1848, and on the same day accepted from the Executive Commission the Ministry of War he had previously refused. At the National Assembly he sat among the Moderate Republicans, and there, at the 10 June session, he engaged in a debate with the Bonapartist deputy Georges-Charles de Heeckeren d'Anthès, which started a lasting antagonism between the general and Louis-Napoléon Bonaparte.

== June Days uprising ==
On 23 June, the Executive Commission put Cavaignac in charge of suppressing an armed workers' insurrection in eastern Paris, which would become known as the June Days. By 24 June, the insurgents posed such a threat that the National Assembly gave Cavaignac dictatorial powers, and disbanded the Executive Committee. Cavaignac viewed the insurrection as a military issue above all else, and thus relied on the regular army with assistance from the National Guard, and did not hesitate to use cannons to break through barricades. When his troops advanced in three strong columns every inch of ground was disputed, and government troops were frequently repulsed, requiring reinforcement by fresh regiments, until he forced his way to the Place de la Bastille and crushed the insurrection at its headquarters. By 26 June the uprising had been put down.

In the view of Cavaignac and other Moderate Republicans in government, the young Republic had just been saved. He had suppressed the revolt with strong determination, but took time in preparing to attack. At the time Alphonse de Lamartine even suspected Cavaignac of having deliberately chosen to delay the government's response, allowing the early protests on 23 June to grow, so that his ultimate victory over the insurgents would be more decisive.

== Chief of the Executive Power ==
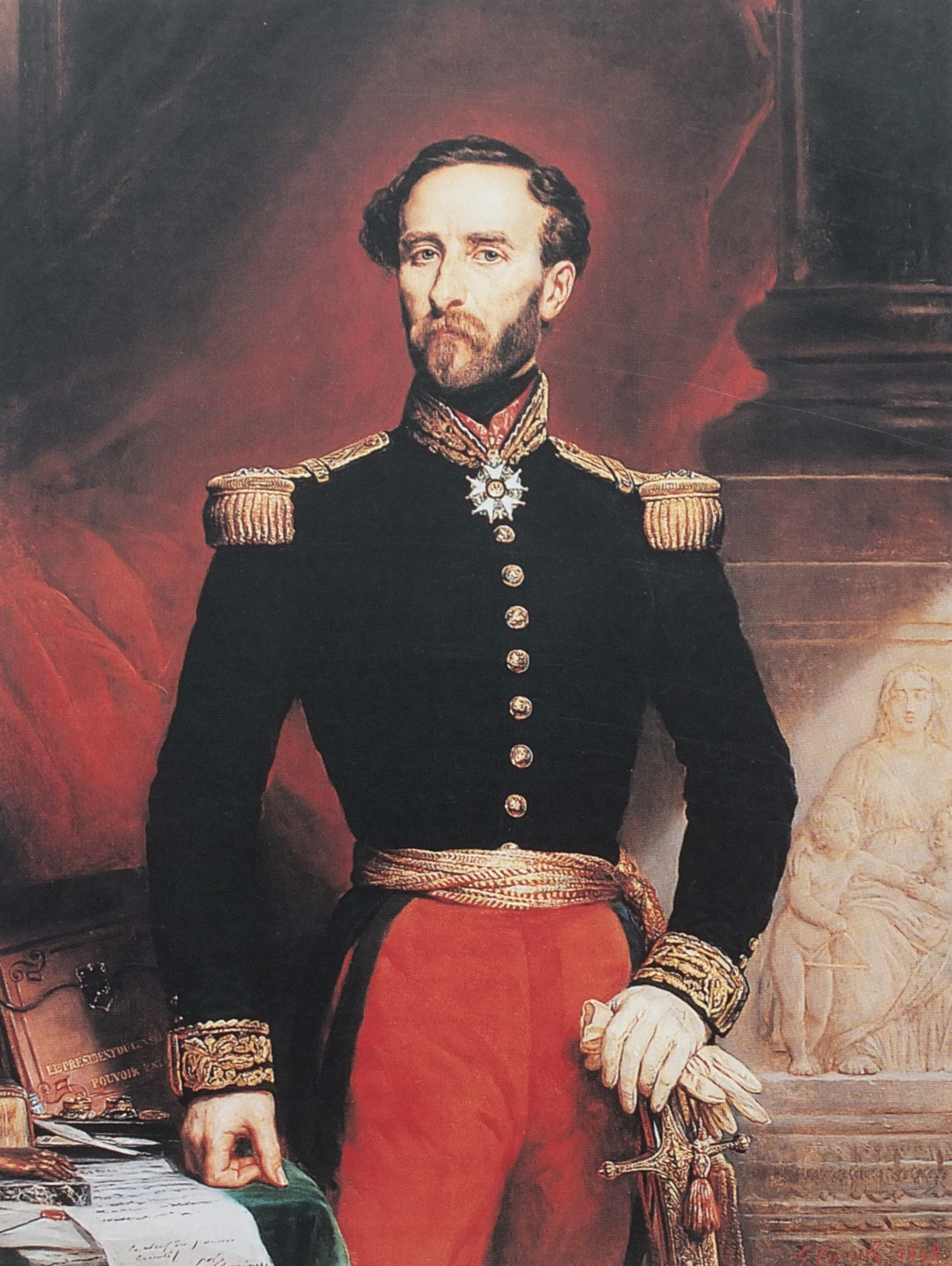
Portrait by François-Gabriel Lépaulle, 1848

After defeating the insurrection, Cavaignac presented himself before the National Assembly and announced his intention to renounce the dictatorial powers delegated to him, which he did on 28 June. The parliament therefore confirmed him in power as Chief of the Executive Power (Chef du pouvoir exécutif). As a committed Republican, Cavaignac strove as head of state of France to secure the democratic institutions recently achieved with the February Revolution, and selected the members of his cabinet accordingly. Many government ministers were also connected to the newspaper Le National, the press of the Moderate Republican majority of the National Assembly.

In his early government, Cavaignac imposed control over political clubs and suppressed the left-wing press, which he deemed responsible for inciting the armed insurrection of June. He temporarily prohibited the publication of eleven newspapers, including Le Père Duchêne, named after the 1790s radical publication. He would later, in August, indefinitely ban Le Père Duchêne along with three other journals for being "instruments of civil war and not of liberty".

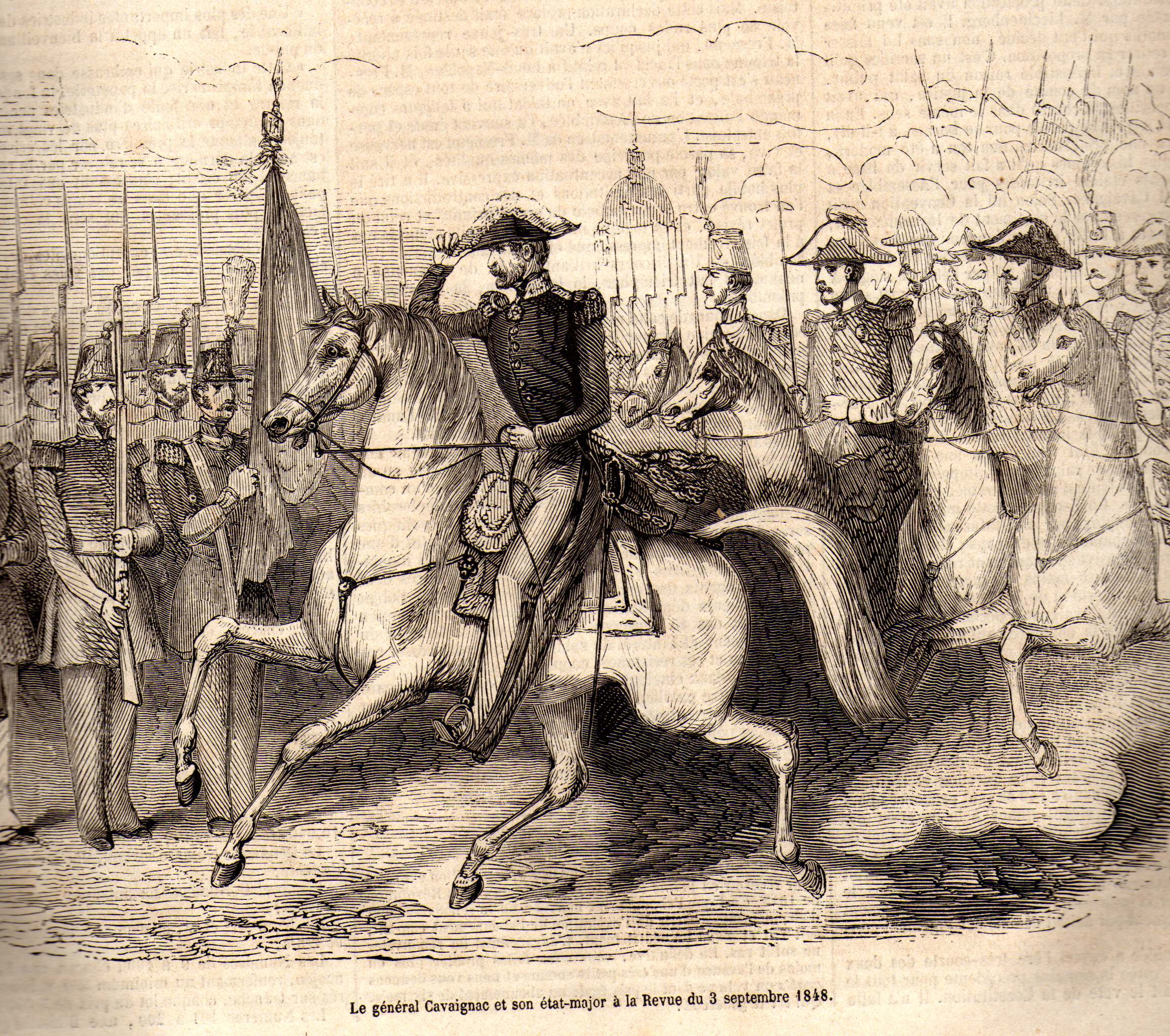
Cavaignac and his military staff reviewing the troops on 3 September 1848

As previously decided by the National Assembly before the June Days, Cavaignac closed down the national workshops in July. Direct relief was provided by the government to supplant the national workshops, and large-scale public works were undertaken in order to reduce unemployment. Cavaignac's government gave support to producers' and workers' cooperatives, sponsored legislation on maximum working hours for adult factory workers, and promoted the modernization of the French postal system. During this period, with the Chief of the Executive's support, a democratic constitution was prepared by the National Assembly.

Unemployment relief was provided while various steps were taken to boost economic recovery and create jobs. According to one study, "Cavaignac’s interest in the workers was attested by the numerous proposals offered by his government in their favor, and by the large number of documents concerning social and economic problems that he preserved in his papers." Cavaignac supported, for instance, a proposal for government-administered and compulsory sickness and old-age insurance for workers. He believed this was necessary due to industry not providing sufficient salaries to allow for adequate savings. His social insurance plan was, however, defeated.

Measures were taken to improve conditions for workers within the Interior Ministry, while government aid to producers’ cooperatives was implemented. Maximum hours legislation for male factory workers was successfully sponsored by the government. Other labor reforms introduced earlier in 1848, such as the abolition of the "marchandage," were preserved. The Cavaignac Government also introduced other labor reforms, such as sickness and accident insurance for workers on public works projects. Under this reform, the state paid medical treatment and provided disability payments to injured workers or their survivors. An order was also issued (applying to regulations for state contracts) providing for the wages of workers to be guaranteed in case of an employer’s bankruptcy. Important reforms in public assistance were carried out, while the government also extended a previous labor reform under which workers were given equal representation with employers in the labor courts. Relief was also provided to unemployed people in Paris, at the daily rate of thirty-five centimes per person.

In foreign policy, during a year marked by the Spring of Nations revolutions through much of Europe, Cavaignac essentially maintained the stance previously adopted by the provisional government, of asserting sympathy towards the national movements, specially those in Italy, Germany and Poland, but avoided direct involvement. The worry about internal security and the complex situation abroad prompted a policy of neutrality. The chief concern for his government was the Italian War of Independence, being waged against the Austrian Empire by Piedmont-Sardinia in northern Italy. After the Austrian victory in late July at the Battle of Custoza, Cavaignac organized an army to support Piedmont-Sardinia, but in the absence of a request did not intervene. In contradiction, he also organized, and later cancelled, in November an expeditionary force to rescue Pope Pius IX, who had fled from a republican revolution in Rome.

=== Presidential election ===
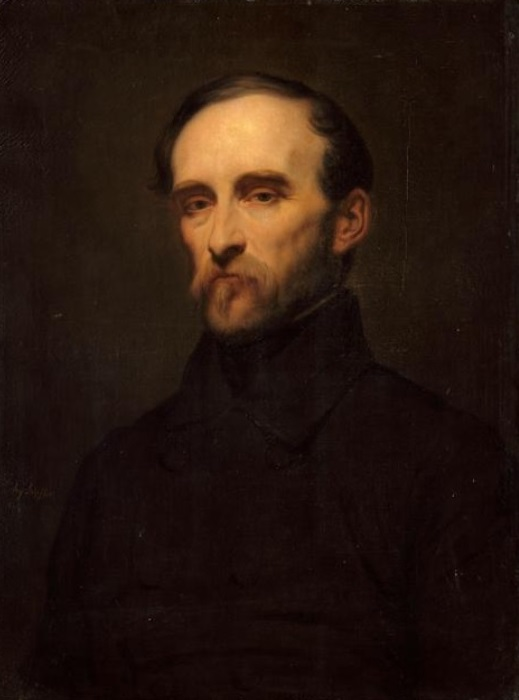
Cavaignac by Ary Scheffer

On 8 October, the National Assembly voted to submit the election of a President of the Republic to popular suffrage. As election day approached, increasing evidence suggested that it would most likely be a contest between Cavaignac and Louis-Napoléon Bonaparte. Both leading candidates attempted to gain the support of the conservative Party of Order. With that goal, Cavaignac in October introduced two Orleanists into his cabinet (Vivien and Dufaure) when chance appeared for a ministerial reform, and even indirectly approached Adolphe Thiers, leader of the party, with a proposal for the vice-presidency in his government. Thiers however considered Cavaignac too left-leaning, and the general would not commit himself to the conservatives as much as they wanted him to. He instead preferred Louis-Napoléon, who, according to Thiers, "seems to dissociate himself more from the reds and socialists than does General Cavaignac".

After much internal debate, the Party of Order decided, on 5 November, not to give their endorsement to any candidate. In this situation Cavaignac's supporters had hoped that the party would put forward their own candidate, therefore splitting the popular vote and increasing Cavaignac's chances of victory, for in the case of no absolute majority the final decision would be taken by the Assembly, where Cavaignac was backed by the majority. The absence of a third candidate worked for the advantage of Louis-Napoléon, who was the evident favorite of the popular classes. Cavaignac nevertheless was supported by most of the French press, including liberal newspapers such as Le Siècle and the Journal des débats, which could lead to his potential victory as campaigning was mainly carried out by the press.

Voting took place on 10 and 11 December. As the first results to come in already suggested an imminent victory for Louis-Napoléon, Cavaignac was reportedly urged by his adviser Colonel Charras to carry out a self coup to remain in power, but he refused. To Charras' argument that giving power to Louis-Napoléon would compromise the Republic, Cavaignac responded, "it is possible that it will succumb, but it will rise again". Louis-Napoléon won the election with an absolute majority of 74% of the votes cast, with Cavaignac coming in second place with 19.5%. The only four departments not to give the winner a majority of votes were won by Cavaignac; these were in Brittany (Finistère and Morbihan) and Provence (Bouches-du-Rhône and Var). On 20 December a peaceful transfer of power took place in the chamber of the National Assembly. In a brief farewell speech, Cavaignac thanked the parliament for "its confidence and its kindness toward me" and presented the resignation of himself and his cabinet, then proceeded to return to his seat as a member of the Assembly. Armand Marrast, president of the parliament, subsequently proclaimed Louis-Napoléon as President of the Republic.

== Later career ==
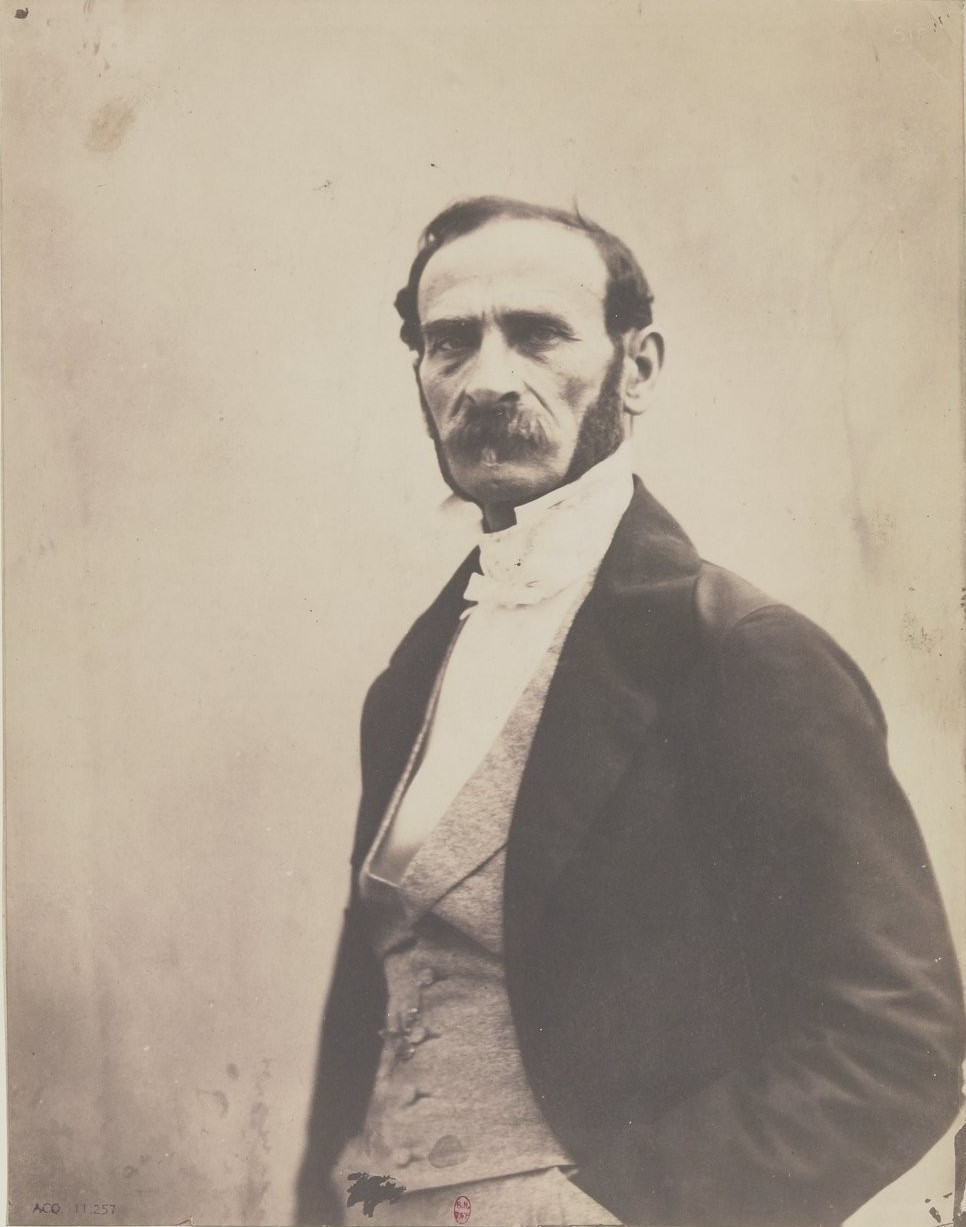
Portrait by Nadar (after 1854)

Cavaignac continued to serve as a representative in the National Assembly for the remainder of the Second Republic. Reelected for Lot but also for Seine in the May 1849 election, he chose to continue to represent Lot and took his seat with the Moderate Republicans on the left. Cavaignac mostly voted with the opposition; he voted against the military expedition sent by the president to suppress the revolutionary Roman Republic, and opposed the law of 31 May 1850, which restricted universal male suffrage, and an 1851 proposal to revise the constitution. The anti-suffrage law of 31 May was approved, and revoking it was used as a pretext by Louis-Napoléon for his coup d'état of 2 December 1851, in which he seized dictatorial powers and dissolved the National Assembly.

In the early hours of 2 December, Cavaignac was arrested by the police at his house in 9th arrondissement of Paris, at the same time as other members of the opposition. First imprisoned in Mazas Prison and later transferred to the Château de Ham, he was soon released on 29 December to marry Mademoiselle Odier, a young woman from the Odier banking family, as they were engaged at the time of Cavaignac's arrest. He retired from the army after his marriage, and the couple's son, Jacques Marie Eugène Godefroy Cavaignac, was born in May 1852. Under the French Empire of Louis-Napoléon (now emperor Napoleon III) which replaced the Republic, he was elected to the Corps législatif, on the 1852 and 1857 elections. On both occasions, however, Cavaignac refused to take the oath of allegiance to the Empire and was therefore barred from taking his seat.

In 1855, Cavaignac bought the Château d'Ourne in Flée, Sarthe. He died at the estate on 28 October 1857, aged 55. His funeral was held in Paris and had as pallbearers his former colleagues Michel Goudchaux, Joseph Guinard, Jules Bastide, and a worker named Bayard. He was buried next to his brother Godefroi in the Montmartre Cemetery, in Paris.

== See also ==
- Cabinet of General Cavaignac
- French Algeria

== Notes ==
Political offices
Preceded by Henri d'Orléans, Duke of Aumale	Governor of Algeria; 24 February 1848 – 29 April 1848	Succeeded by Nicolas Changarnier
Preceded by Jacques Gervais, baron Subervie	Minister of War; 20 March 1848 – 5 April 1848	Succeeded by François Arago
Preceded by Jean-Baptiste Adolphe Charras	Minister of War; 17 May 1848 – 28 June 1848	Succeeded by Louis Juchault de Lamoricière
Preceded by Executive Commission: François Arago; Louis-Antoine Garnier-Pagès; Alphonse de Lamartine; Alexandre Ledru-Rollin; Pierre Marie (de Saint-Georges)	Chief of the Executive Power; President of the Council of Ministers; 28 June 1848 – 20 December 1848	Succeeded by Louis-Napoléon Bonaparte; President of the Republic
