= French Executive Commission of 1848 =

Second government of the French Second Republic

Executive Commission of 1848
- France; Cabinet of France
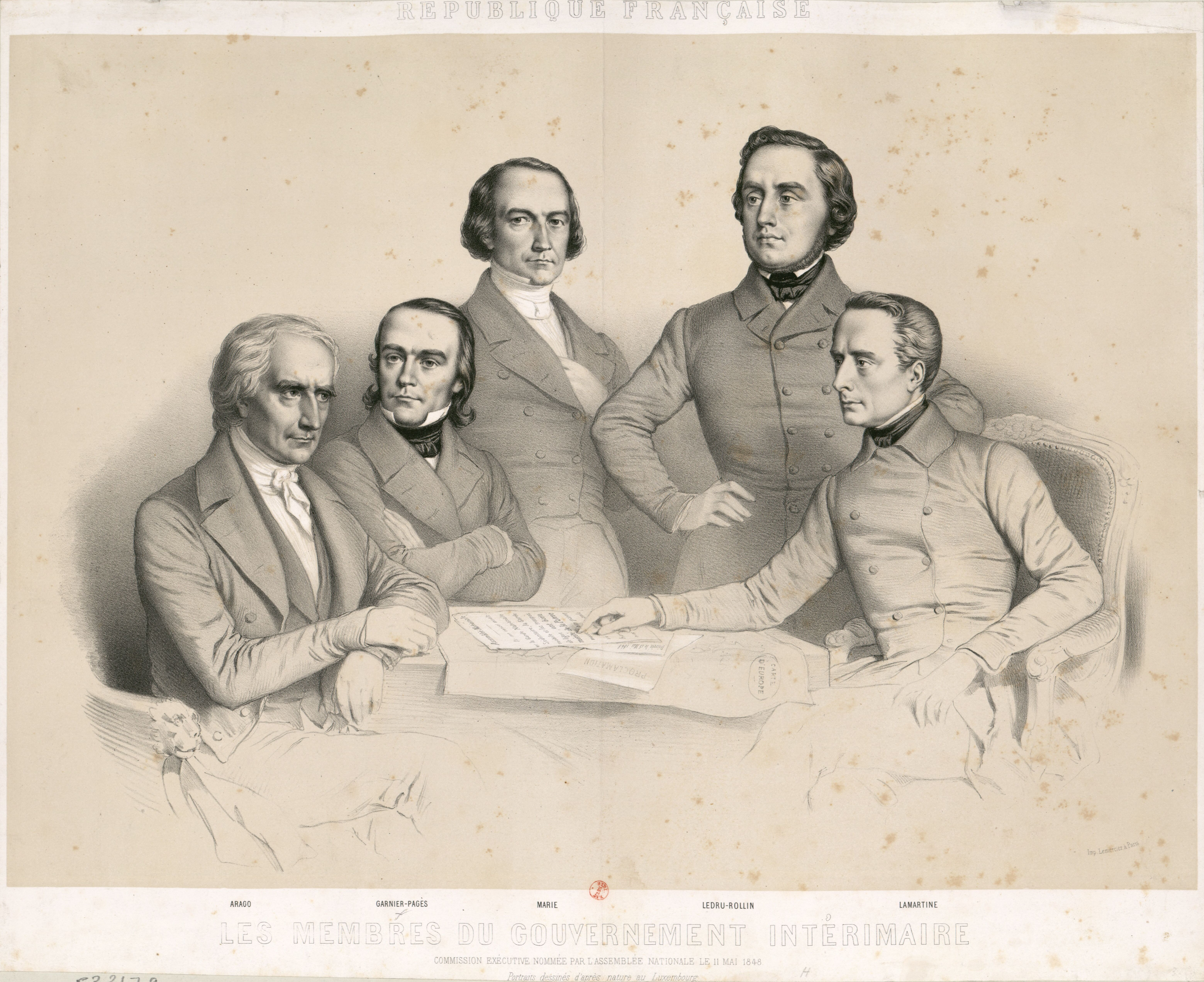
- The members of the Executive Commission (from left to right): Arago, Garnier-Pagès, Marie, Ledru-Rollin, and Lamartine.
- Date formed: 9 May 1848
- Date dissolved: 24 June 1848

People and organisations
- Head of state: Executive Commission members
- Head of government: François Arago

History
- Predecessor: Provisional Government of 1848
- Successor: Cabinet of General Cavaignac

The Executive Commission of 1848 (French: Commission exécutive) was a short-lived government during the French Second Republic, chaired by François Arago, which exercised executive power from 9 May to 24 June 1848. It succeeded the Provisional Government of 1848 and was in turn replaced by the Cabinet of General Cavaignac. The members of the Commission acted as collective head of state.

The Commission lacked support in the National Assembly. It soon found itself at odds with the conservative majority and effectively unable to properly govern. The closure of the National Workshops, which led to the June Days uprising, sealed its fate. Judging the Commission unable to quell the uprising, the Assembly effectively dissolved it on 24 June by a vote of no confidence and gave full powers to General Louis-Eugène Cavaignac.

== Formation ==
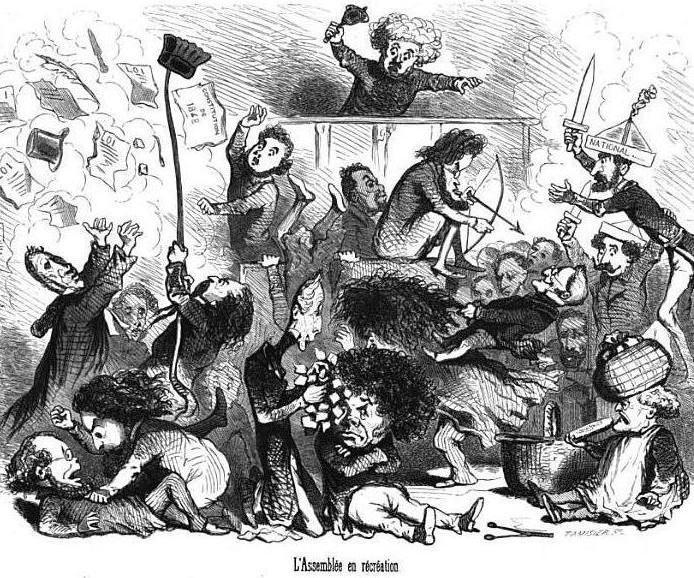
The Constituent Assembly of 1848, by Cham

In May 1848 the National Assembly decided to establish the Executive Commission as a collective head of state, similar to the National Convention and its Committee of Public Safety in the first French Revolution. The members were chosen from prominent members of the former Provisional Government. The members named to the commission by the Assembly on 9 May 1848 were François Arago (as President of the Commission), Alphonse de Lamartine, Louis-Antoine Garnier-Pagès, Alexandre Auguste Ledru-Rollin and Pierre Marie de Saint-Georges.

Lamartine was seen by many as representing order and respect for property, while Ledru-Rollin stood for violence and communism. However, Lamartine used his strong popular mandate to force the National Assembly to make Ledru-Rollin one of the members of the Executive Commission. This greatly undermined his credibility. Lamartine's motives are unclear, but perhaps he was concerned that the power was swinging too far towards the Conservatives.

The members of the Executive Commission were not assigned ministries. Instead, at the first meeting on 11 May 1848 the commission appointed ministers. They were all moderate republicans apart from Ferdinand Flocon. The composition of the government was thus unsatisfactory to both the conservative majority of the National Assembly and the radical left.

== Events ==
=== Demonstration of 15 May ===
At this time the bourgeoisie were becoming increasingly uneasy about the possibility of mob rule leading to a repeat of the Reign of Terror of the first French Revolution. Ledru-Rollin planned a fête de la Concorde on 15 May celebrating peace and labor that included decorations that recalled the earlier revolution. On 13 May the Executive Commission, nervous about rumors of planned demonstrations, announced that the festival was postponed. The move backfired. A crowd led by Louis Auguste Blanqui launched an attack on 15 May on the Palais Bourbon, where the Assembly was meeting. The head of the National Guard of Paris, General Amable de Courtais, would not order his men to use violence. For three hours the Assembly was paralyzed by the demonstrators.

Order was restored, but the authority of the Commission was damaged. The conservative majority in the Assembly blamed the Executive Commission for allowing the incident to occur, saying it was not competent. The arrest of the leaders of the workers, Armand Barbès and Blanqui, left the working people without leaders. General Coutais was also arrested, accused of treason. The government reorganized the National Guard and moved a large garrison of regular army troops into the center of Paris. On 22 May 1848 the Executive Commission dissolved the Club Raspail and the Club Blanqui, left-wing bases.

=== Issue of Louis-Napoléon ===
Louis-Napoléon Bonaparte, who was in exile in London, was elected to the National Assembly on 4 June 1848. He was known to be ambitious to take supreme power, and had already made two failed attempts, in 1836 and 1840. A circular appeared in the departments on 16 June 1848 in which the Executive Government ordered the arrest of Louis-Napoléon. It appears to have been issued just before the question was raised in the National Assembly, and indicates that the government was confident that the motion would pass. On 13 June Lamartine and Ledru-Rollin argued in the Assembly that Louis-Napoleon be disqualified, but the majority voted to admit him. In the event, Louis-Napoleon sent a letter of resignation, but his plans remained unclear. This was another of the steps that weakened the government and led to its fall.

=== June Days ===
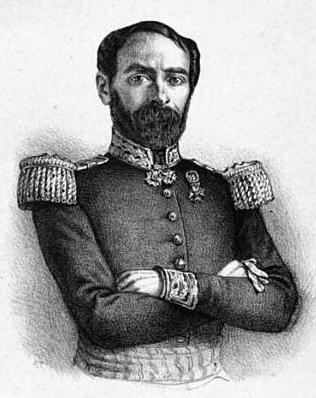
General Louis-Eugène Cavaignac

National Workshops had been established by decree of the Provisional Government in February 1848 with the objective of providing employment through undertaking public works. They employed thousands of men during the spring of 1848, doing jobs like leveling and ditching. The National Assembly placed increasing pressure on the Commission to close down the workshops. When the Executive Commission announced their effective closure on 21 June 1848 this pushed an already discontented proletariat into open rebellion.

According to the Bien Public, the commission anticipated the June Days Uprising (23–26 June 1848) and ordered General Louis-Eugène Cavaignac to concentrate forty or fifty thousand men in Paris so he could suppress the riots without bloodshed. However, when the riots began on the morning of Friday 23 June there were only ten to twelve thousand troops in the city. Cavaignac insisted on letting the workers build their barricades without opposition, so they could be more effectively destroyed, where Lamartine and others argued for taking immediate action to avoid bloodshed. Cavaignac's views prevailed.

On Saturday 24 June 1848 the Assembly decided to remove the Executive Commission from power and install Cavaignac as dictator. At the insistence of the Assembly the five members of the Executive Commission resigned on that day. This ended the political careers of Lamartine and Ledru-Rollin. Once Cavaignac had been granted full power, more troops appeared and the uprising was quickly suppressed.

== Ministers ==
The ministerial appointments were:

| Portfolio | Holder | Party |
|---|---|---|
| President of the Executive Commission | François Arago | Moderate Republican |
| Member of the Commission | Louis-Antoine Garnier-Pagès | Moderate Republican |
| Member of the Commission | Alphonse de Lamartine | Moderate Republican |
| Member of the Commission | Alexandre Ledru-Rollin | Radical Republican |
| Member of the Commission | Pierre Marie de Saint-Georges | Moderate Republican |
| Minister of Foreign Affairs | Jules Bastide | Moderate Republican |
| Minister of the Interior | Adrien Recurt | Moderate Republican |
| Minister of Justice | Adolphe Crémieux | Moderate Republican |
| Minister of Finance | Charles Duclerc | Moderate Republican |
| Minister of Public Works | Ulysse Trélat | Moderate Republican |
| Minister of Trade and Agriculture | Ferdinand Flocon | Radical Republican |
| Minister of Education | Hippolyte Carnot | Moderate Republican |
| Minister of Worship | Eugène Bethmont | Moderate Republican |
| Minister of War | Jean-Baptiste Charras | Military |
| Minister of the Navy and Colonies | Joseph Grégoire Casy | Military |

Changes

- On 17 May 1848, General Eugène Cavaignac replaced Jean-Baptiste Charras as Minister of War.
- On 7 June 1848, Eugène Bethmont replaced Adolphe Crémieux as Minister of Justice.

== Sources ==
- Agulhon, Maurice (1 September 1983). The Republican Experiment, 1848-1852. Cambridge University Press. ISBN 978-0-521-28988-7.
- Chamier, Frederick (1849). A review of the French revolution of 1848: from the 24th of February to the election of the first president. Reeve, Benham, and Reeve.
- Fortescue, William (2 August 2004). France and 1848: The End of Monarchy. Routledge. ISBN 978-1-134-37923-1.
- Plotek, Ariel (2008). Allegory in the Age of Realism: Monumental Sculpture in France, 1848—1880. ISBN 978-0-549-75004-8.
- Robertson, Priscilla Smith (1952). Revolutions of 1848: A Social History. Princeton University Press. ISBN 0-691-00756-X.
- Robert, Adolphe; Cougny, Gaston (1889). "COURTAIS (Amable-Gaspard-Henri, vicomte de)". Dictionnaire des Parlementaires français de 1789 à 1889 (PDF). Vol. 2. Archived from the original (PDF) on 2016-03-03.
- Sewell, William Hamilton (31 October 1980). Work and Revolution in France: The Language of Labor from the Old Regime to 1848. Cambridge University Press. ISBN 978-0-521-29951-0.
