= Nicolas-Philippe Ledru =

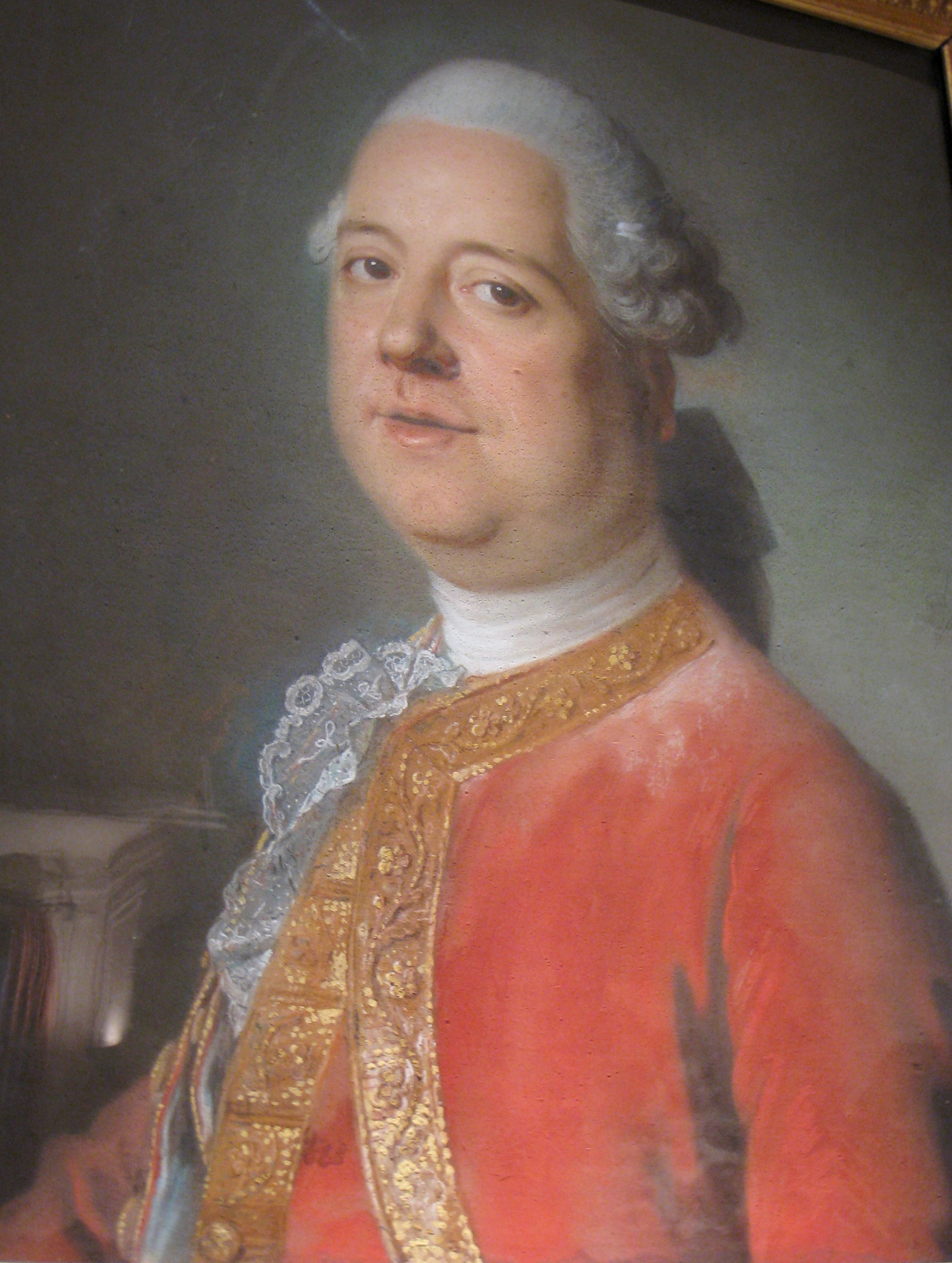
Nicolas-Philippe Ledru

Nicolas-Philippe Ledru (1731, Paris – October 6, 1807, Fontenay-aux-Roses), known as Comus, was a French physicist, prestidigitator and illusionist of the late 18th century. He had two sons, Jacques Philippe Ledru (1754–1832), a member of the French National Academy of Medicine and a mayor of Fontenay-aux-Roses, and Jacques Auguste Ledru, an inspector of pawn-shops. The latter was the father of Alexandre Auguste Ledru-Rollin, a lawyer and a French politician.

Nicolas-Philippe Ledru styled himself Comus after the Greek god of mirth and revelry, and entertained royalty, aristocrats, and the general public with his scientific experiments. He traveled extensively throughout Europe demonstrating his tricks and acquired a huge reputation. He had an office in Paris where he performed various experiments for the public on sound, light, electricity, magnetism, incompressibility of water and so on. At his office he also introduced tricks of illusion, such as a female robot getting dressed when asked, a small face with eyes taking on the color of the pupil of the one who looked at it, an artificial hand writing thoughts of a spectator, a "siren" answering questions and so on. Comus occasionally introduced his tricks at the court of Louis XVI, and in May 1777 he gave a performance in Paris for Joseph II, Holy Roman Emperor.

Apart from demonstrating magic acts, he devised a new system for nautical maps and an application of electricity for therapeutic purposes for illness of the nervous system or, simply, epilepsy. Louis XV, who appointed him his physician, gave him the title Professeur de Physique des Enfants de France. Louis XVI authorized him to practice at his new hospice Médico-Électrique.

Comus was imprisoned during the Terror but avoided the guillotine. He died in 1807 a wealthy man. His fortune ultimately descended to his grandson Alexandre Auguste Ledru-Rollin.

== Sources ==
- La feuille nécessaire, 9 juillet 1759, p. 346.
- L'Avantcoureur, 2 février 1761, p. 68., 1 février 1762, p. 75.
- Lettre de Diderot à Sophie Voland du 28 juillet 1762.
- L'Avantcoureur, 8 avril 1765.
- Lettre et regrets de souscription d'une jeune provinciale à une de ses amies à Paris, sur l'ouvrage intitulé : Récréations physiques et mathématiques du sieur Guyot, 1769, p. 8.
- Correspondance littéraire, philosophique et critique, janvier 1770, pp. 444-5.
- Almanach forain, 1773.
- Claude-Adrien Helvétius, De l’homme, de ses facultés intellectuelles & de son éducation, Londres 1776, p. 173.
- Journal de Paris, 21 avril 1777, 2 mai 1777; 19 avril 1778, 18 juin 1778, 2 juillet 1778, 15 aout 1778, 31 aout 1778, 8 septembre 1778, 13 septembre 1778; 4 avril 1779, 9 mai 1779, 23 mai 1779, 3 juin 1779, 27 juin 1779, 28 juin 1779, 29 juin 1779; 26 mars 1780; 16 juin 1782.
- Louis Sébastien Mercier, Tableau de Paris, vol. 2, chez Virchaux & Compagnie, Paris 1782, p. 29.
- Nicolas Philippe Ledru "Comus", Rapport sur les avantages reconnus de la nouvelle méthode d'administrer l'électricité dans les maladies nerveuses, Philippe-Denys Pierres, Paris 1783.
- Louis Petit de Bachaumont, Mémoires secrets pour servir à l'histoire de la république des lettres en France, Vol. XXV, 9 avril 1784, p. 219.
- La Gazette Noire (1784), p. 219.
- Jean Chrétien Ferdinand Hoefer, Nouvelle biographie générale, Vol. 30, 1853, p. 143.
- Charles Lefeuve, Les anciennes maisons de Paris. Histoire de Paris rue par rue, maison par maison, Tome 3, C. Reinwald, Paris 1875, p. 447.
- Thomas Frost, The Lives of the Conjurors, Tinsley Brothers, London 1876, p. 120.
- Calman, Alvin Rosenblatt. Ledru-Rollin and the Second French Republic. New York: Columbia University, 1922. On-line text at www.archive.org.
