= Alexandre Auguste Ledru-Rollin =

French politician, revolutionary (1807–1874)

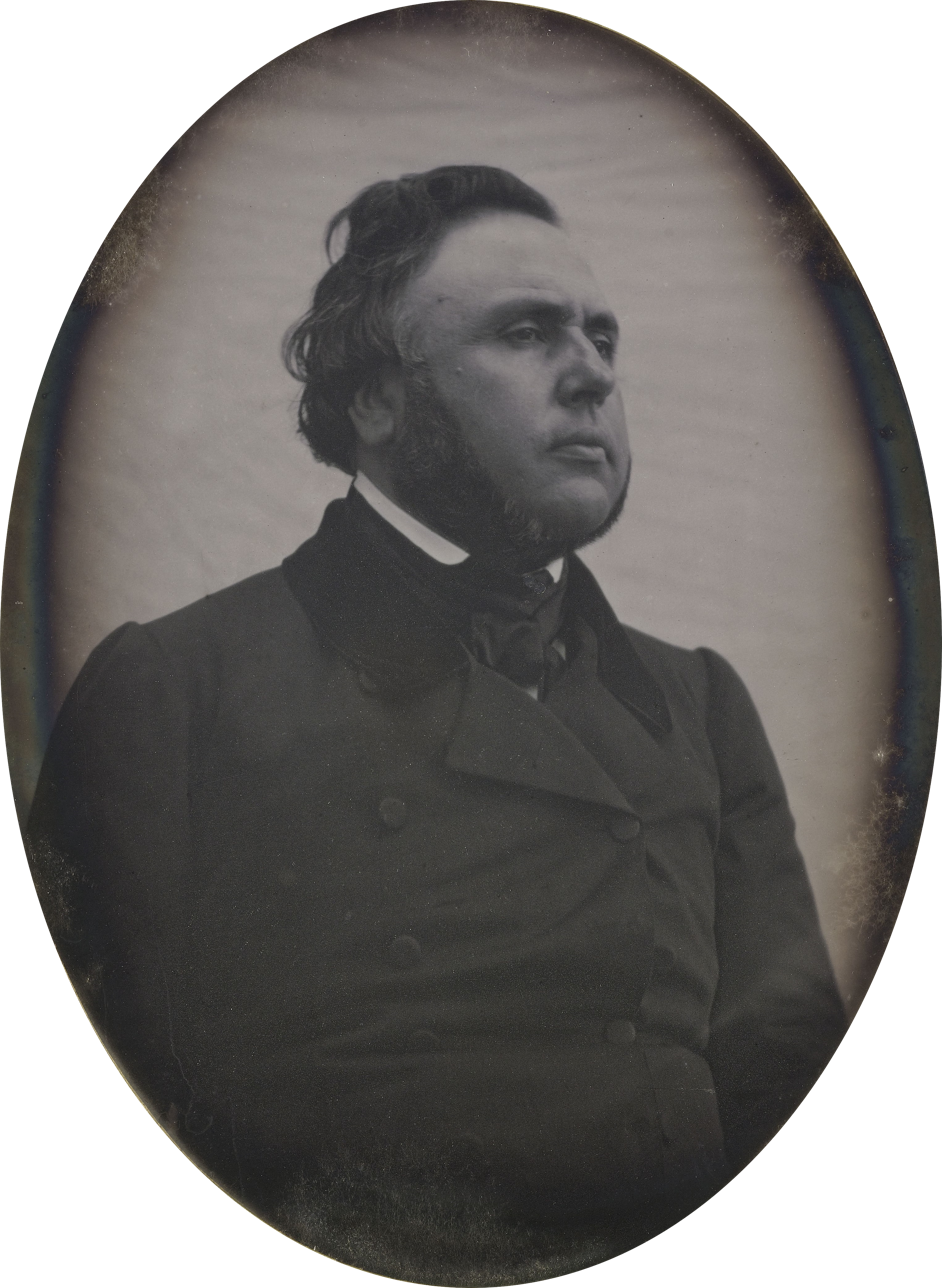
- Ledru-Rollin in 1848

Member of the National Assembly for Vaucluse
- In office 1 March 1874 – 31 December 1874
- In office 12 February 1871 – 28 February 1871

Member of the National Assembly for Var
- In office 28 May 1849 – 2 December 1851

Member of the Constituent Assembly for Seine
- In office 4 May 1848 – 26 May 1849

Member of the Executive Commission
- In office 6 May 1848 – 28 June 1848
- Preceded by: Office established
- Succeeded by: Office abolished

Minister of the Interior
- In office 24 February 1848 – 9 May 1848
- Preceded by: Tanneguy Duchâtel
- Succeeded by: Adrien Recurt

Member of the Chamber of Deputies for Sarthe
- In office 17 August 1846 – 24 February 1848
- In office 26 July 1842 – 6 July 1846
- In office 4 April 1839 – 12 June 1842

Personal details
- Born: 2 February 1807 Paris, France
- Died: 31 December 1874 (aged 67) Fontenay-aux-Roses, France
- Resting place: Père Lachaise Cemetery
- Party: Montagnard
- Spouse: Harriet Sharpe
- Relatives: Jacques-Philippe Ledru (uncle); Nicolas-Philippe Ledru (grandfather)
- Occupation: Lawyer, politician, journalist

Alexandre Auguste Ledru-Rollin (French pronunciation: [alɛksɑ̃dʁ oɡyst(ə) lədʁy ʁɔlɛ̃]; 2 February 1807 – 31 December 1874) was a French lawyer, politician and journalist who emerged as one of the leaders of the French Revolution of 1848. He served as Minister of the Interior and on the Executive Commission in 1848, in addition to several legislative posts between 1839 and 1874.

== Youth ==
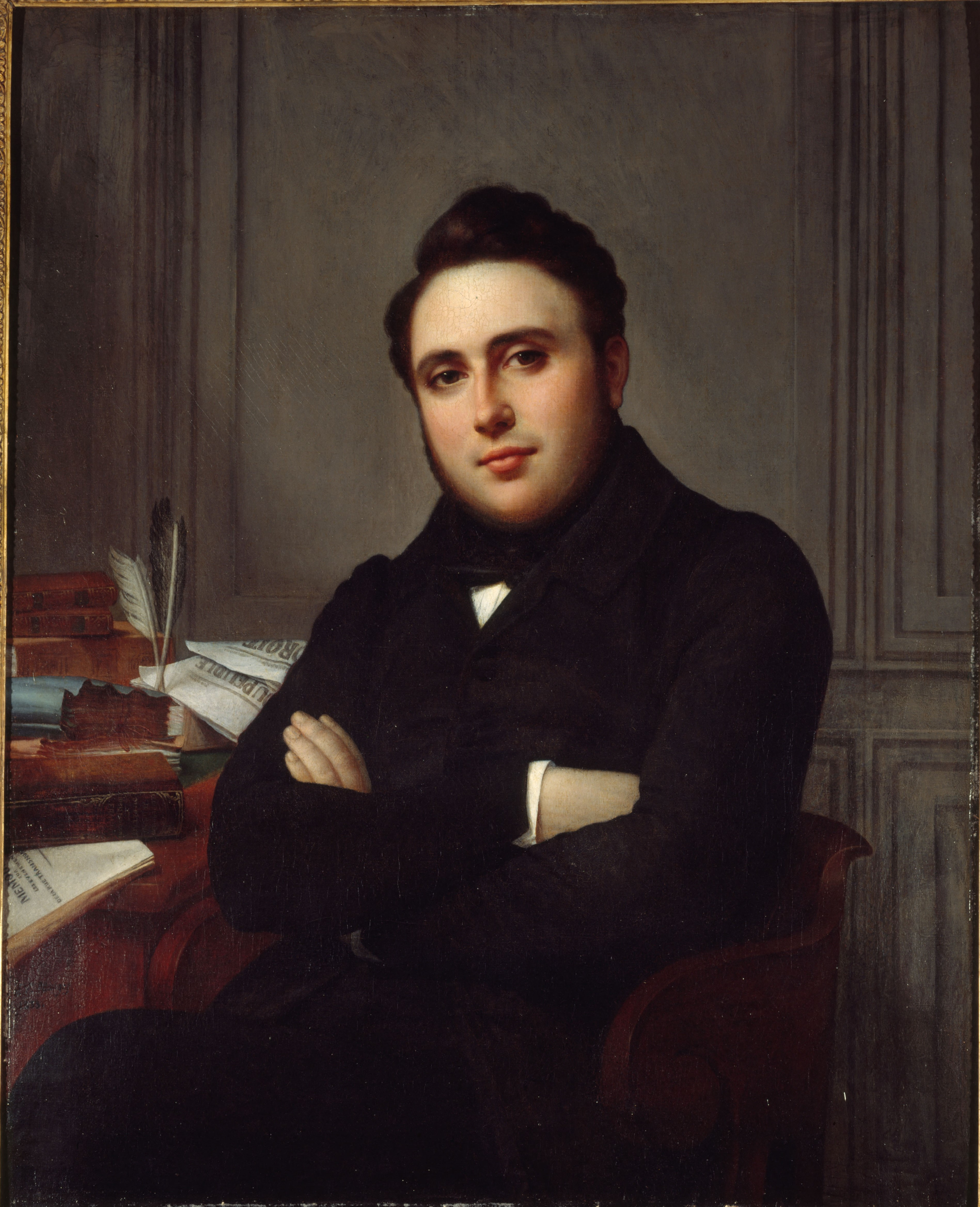
Portrait by Angélique Mongez, 1838

The grandson of Nicolas Philippe Ledru, the celebrated quack doctor known as "Comus" under Louis XV and Louis XVI, Ledru-Rollin was born in Paris. He had just begun to practice at the Parisian bar before the Revolution of July 1830 and was retained for the Republican defence in most of the great political trials of the next ten years. In 1838, he bought for 330,000 francs Désiré Dalloz's place in the Court of Cassation. He was elected deputy for Le Mans in 1841 with little opposition; but the violence of his electoral speeches led to his being tried at Angers and sentenced to four months' imprisonment and a fine, against which he appealed successfully on a technical point.

Under Louis-Philippe I he made large contributions to French jurisprudence, editing the Journal du palais, 1791–1837 (27 you., 1837) and 1837–1847 (17 vols.), with a commentary Repertoire général de la jurisprudence française (8 vols., 1843–1848), the introduction to which was written by himself. His later writings were political in character. See Ledru-Rollin, ses discours et ses écrits politiques (2 vols., Paris, 1879), edited by his widow.

== Politics ==
He made a rich and romantic marriage in 1843 and, in 1846, disposed of his charge at the Court of Cassation to give his time entirely to politics. He was now the recognized leader of the working-men of France. He had more authority in the country than in the Chamber, where the violence of his oratory diminished its effect. He asserted that the fortifications of Paris were directed against liberty, not against foreign invasion, and he stigmatized the law of regency (1842) as an audacious usurpation.

Neither from official liberalism nor from the press did he receive support; even the republican National was opposed to him because of his championship of labour. He therefore founded La Réforme, in which to advance his propaganda. Between Ledru-Rollin and Odilon Barrot with the other chiefs of the "dynastic Left" there were acute differences, hardly dissimulated even during the temporary alliance which produced the campaign of the banquets.

== 1848 ==
It was the speeches of Ledru-Rollin and Louis Blanc at working-men's banquets in Lille, Dijon and Chalon that heralded the revolution of 1848. Ledru-Rollin prevented the appointment of the duchess of Orleans as regent in 1848. He and Alphonse de Lamartine held the tribune in the Chamber of Deputies until the Parisian populace stopped serious discussion by invading the Chamber. He was minister of the interior in the provisional government, and was also a member of the executive committee appointed by the Constituent Assembly, from which Louis Blanc and the extremists were excluded. At the crisis of 15 May, he definitively sided with Lamartine and the party of order against the proletariat.

Henceforward his position was a difficult one. He never regained his influence with the working classes, who considered they had been betrayed; but to his short ministry belongs the credit of the establishment of a working system of universal suffrage. At the presidential election in December he was put forward as the Socialist candidate, but secured only 370,000 votes. Ledru-Rollin led the Mountain, a republican grouping, to the 1849 legislative election, and secured 25% of the vote. His opposition to the policy of President Louis Napoleon, especially French intervention in the Roman Republic (1849–1850), led to his moving the impeachment of the president and his ministers. The motion was defeated, and the next day (13 June 1849) he headed what he called a peaceful demonstration, and his enemies, armed insurrection.

== Exile and final years ==
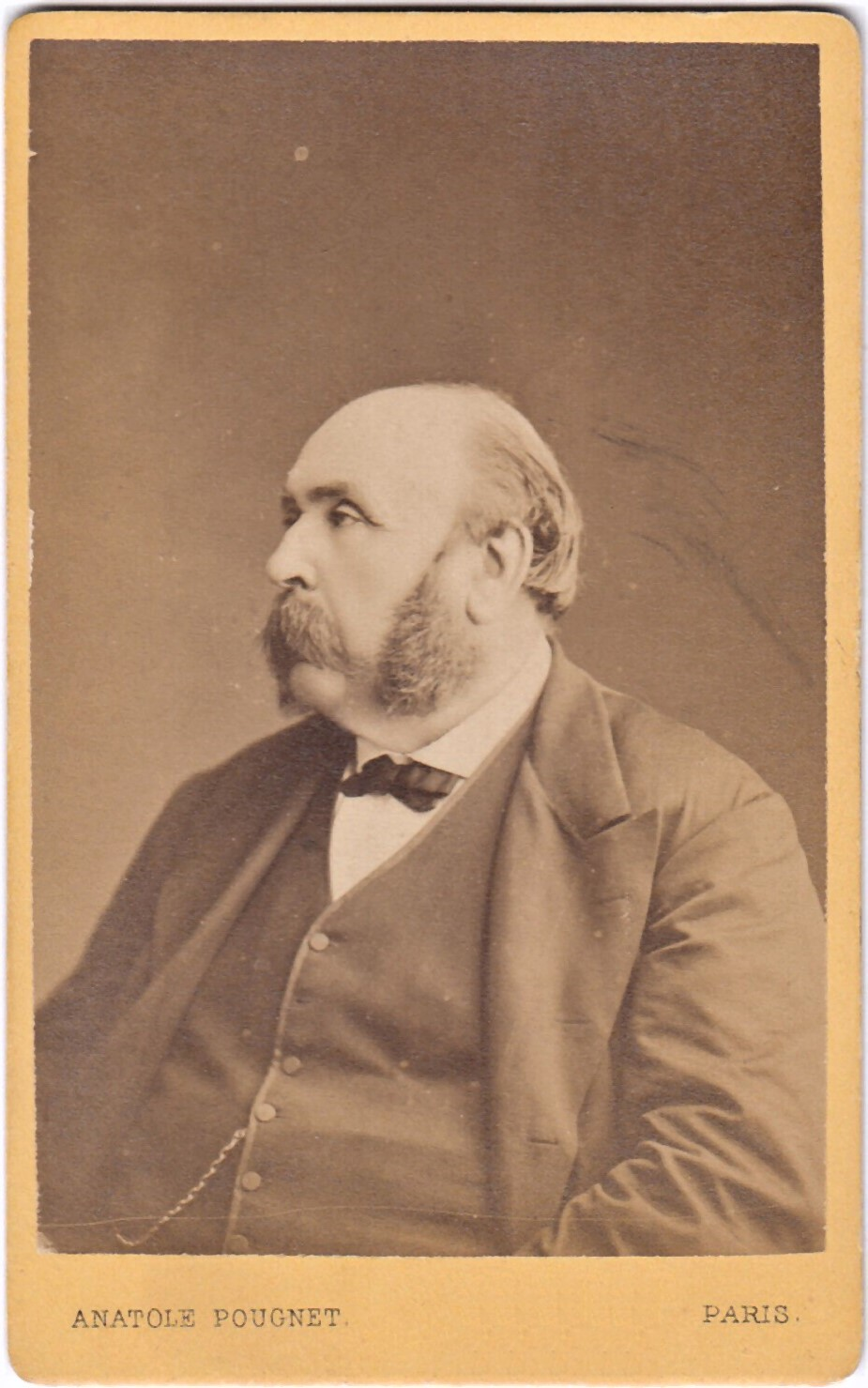
Carte de visite by Anatole Pougnet c. 1871–1874

Ledru-Rollin himself escaped to London where he joined the executive of the revolutionary committee of Europe, with Lajos Kossuth and Giuseppe Mazzini among his colleagues. He was accused of complicity in an obscure attempt (1857) against the life of Napoleon III of France, and condemned in his absence to deportation. Émile Ollivier removed the exceptions from the general amnesty in 1870, and Ledru-Rollin returned to France after twenty years of exile. Though elected in 1871 in three departments he refused to sit in the National Assembly, and took no serious part in politics until 1874 when he was returned to the Assembly as member for Vaucluse.

Ledru-Rollin died in Fontenay-aux-Roses.

There is currently an avenue as well as a Paris Métro station named Ledru-Rollin.

== Quote ==
Some variation of the following is often attributed to Ledru-Rollin:

- "There go the people. I must follow them, for I am their leader."
- "There go my people. I must find out where they are going so I can lead them"
- "Eh! je suis leur chef, il fallait bien les suivre." "Ah well! I am their leader, I really ought to follow them!"

The quote is probably apocryphal.

== Notes ==
Political offices
Preceded by Jacques-Charles Dupont de l'Eure; Chairman of the Provisional Government of the French Republic	Head of State of France; 6 May 1848 – 28 June 1848; Member of the Executive Commission along with: François Arago; Louis-Antoine Garnier-Pagès; Alphonse de Lamartine; Pierre Marie (de Saint-Georges)	Succeeded by Louis-Eugène Cavaignac; President of the Council of Ministers
