= Jacques-Charles Dupont de l'Eure =

French politician (1767–1855)

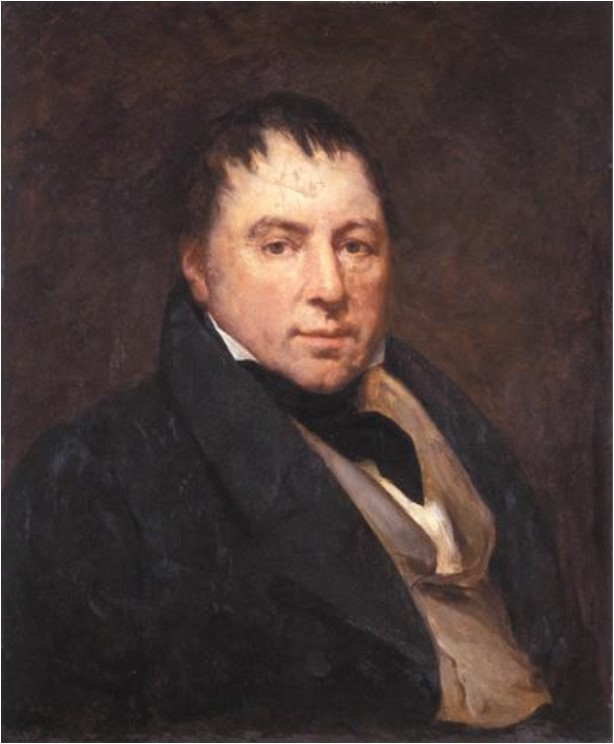
- Portrait by Ary Scheffer

President of the Provisional Government
- In office 26 February 1848 – 9 May 1848
- Preceded by: Louis Philippe II (as King of the French); François Guizot (as Prime Minister of France)
- Succeeded by: François Arago (as President of the Executive Commission)

Personal details
- Born: 27 February 1767 Le Neubourg, Kingdom of France
- Died: 3 March 1855 (aged 88) Rouge-Perriers, French Empire
- Party: Moderate Republicans

Jacques-Charles Dupont de l'Eure (French: [ʒak ʃaʁl dypɔ̃ də lœʁ]; 27 February 1767 – 3 March 1855) was a French lawyer and statesman.

He is best known as the first head of state of the Second Republic, after the collapse of the July Monarchy as a result of the French Revolution of 1848.

== Biography ==
=== Early career ===
Born in Le Neubourg, Normandy, he was a lawyer at the parlement of Normandy when the French Revolution began. During the First Republic and the First Empire, he filled successive judicial offices at Louviers, Rouen and Évreux. He had adopted revolutionary principles, and in 1798 began his political life as a member of the French Directory's Council of Five Hundred.

In 1813 he became a member of the Corps législatif and, during the Hundred Days, was vice-president of the chamber of deputies. When the Seventh Coalition armies entered Paris, he drew up the declaration asserting the necessity of maintaining the principles of government that had been established at the Revolution. He was chosen as one of the commissioners to negotiate with the Coalition sovereigns.

=== Prominence ===
From 1817 until 1849 (through the Bourbon Restoration and the July Monarchy) he was, without interruption, a member of the chamber of deputies, and he acted consistently with the Liberal opposition, of which he was the virtual leader. For a few months in 1830 he held office as Minister of Justice, but, finding himself out of harmony with his colleagues, resigned before the end of the year and resumed his place in the opposition.

=== Second Republic ===
When the 1848 Revolution began, Dupont de l'Eure was made President of the provisional assembly, being its oldest member. On the same day, he was made President of the Provisional Government, becoming France's de facto Head of State. He can therefore be considered as France's first Presidential Head of State, though Louis-Napoléon Bonaparte, later in the same year, was the first to formally bear the title of President of the French Republic. His prestige and popularity prevented the heterogeneous republican coalition from having to immediately agree upon a common leader. Due to his great age (upon entering office, he was just a few days short of his 81st birthday), Dupont de l'Eure effectively delegated part of his duties to Minister of Foreign Affairs Alphonse de Lamartine. On 4 May, he resigned in order to make way for the Executive Commission, which he declined to join. He supported Louis-Eugène Cavaignac against Louis-Napoléon Bonaparte. In 1849, having failed to secure his re-election to the chamber, he retired from public life.

His consistency in defending the cause of constitutional liberalism throughout the many changes of his times gained him the respect of many of his countrymen, who referred to Dupont de l'Eure as "Aristides of the French tribune".

Political offices
Preceded by Jean de Chantelauze	Minister of Justice; 31 July 1830 – 27 December 1830	Succeeded by Joseph Merilhou
Preceded by Louis-Philippe; King of the French	De Facto Head of State of France; 24 February 1848 – 6 May 1848	Succeeded by Executive Commission
Preceded by Louis-Philippe; King of the French	Chairman of the Provisional Government of the French Republic; 24 February 1848 – 6 May 1848	Succeeded by Executive Commission
