= Jean-Baptiste-Adolphe Charras =

French politician and military historian (1810–1865)

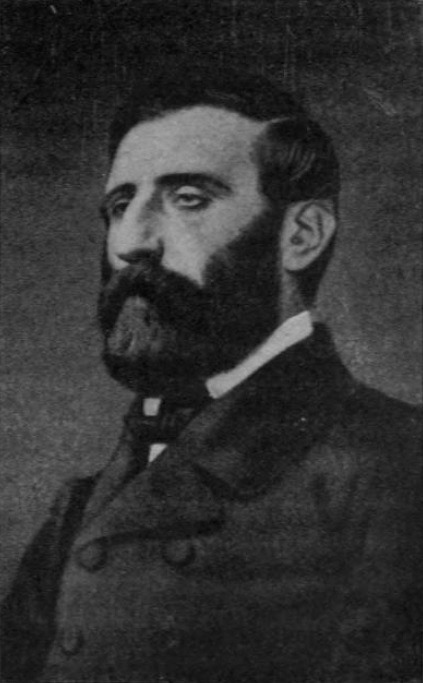
Portrait by Pierre Petit

Jean-Baptiste Adolphe Charras (7 January 1810 in Phalsbourg – 23 January 1865 in Basel) was a French military historian and minister. He was the author of Histoire de la Campagne de 1815.

Lieutenant Colonel Charras rose rapidly within the military administration in 1848 with a series of promotions, becoming Secretary of the Defence Commission on 9 March, Under Secretary of State for War on 5 April, and Acting Minister of War on 11 May of that year.

Political offices
Preceded by François Arago	Minister of War; 11 May 1848 – 17 May 1848	Succeeded by Louis-Eugène Cavaignac
