= Armand Marrast =

French politician and mayor of Paris

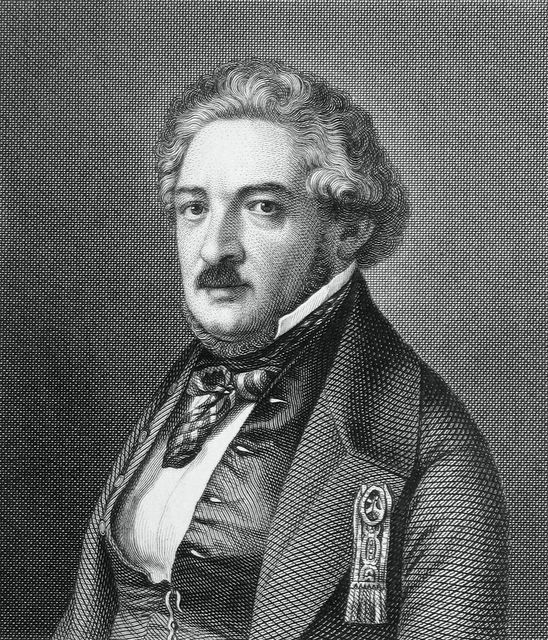
Armand Marrast

Armand Marrast (June 5, 1801, Saint-Gaudens – March 10, 1852, Paris) was a French journalist, politician and mayor of Paris. Editor of La Tribune (1830-35) and Le National (from 1836), he participated in the revolutionary events in Paris in both 1830 and 1848. He died in March 1852 and was buried in Montmartre Cemetery.

== See also ==
- List of presidents of the National Assembly of France
- List of mayors of Paris
