= François Allain-Targé =

French politician (1832–1902)

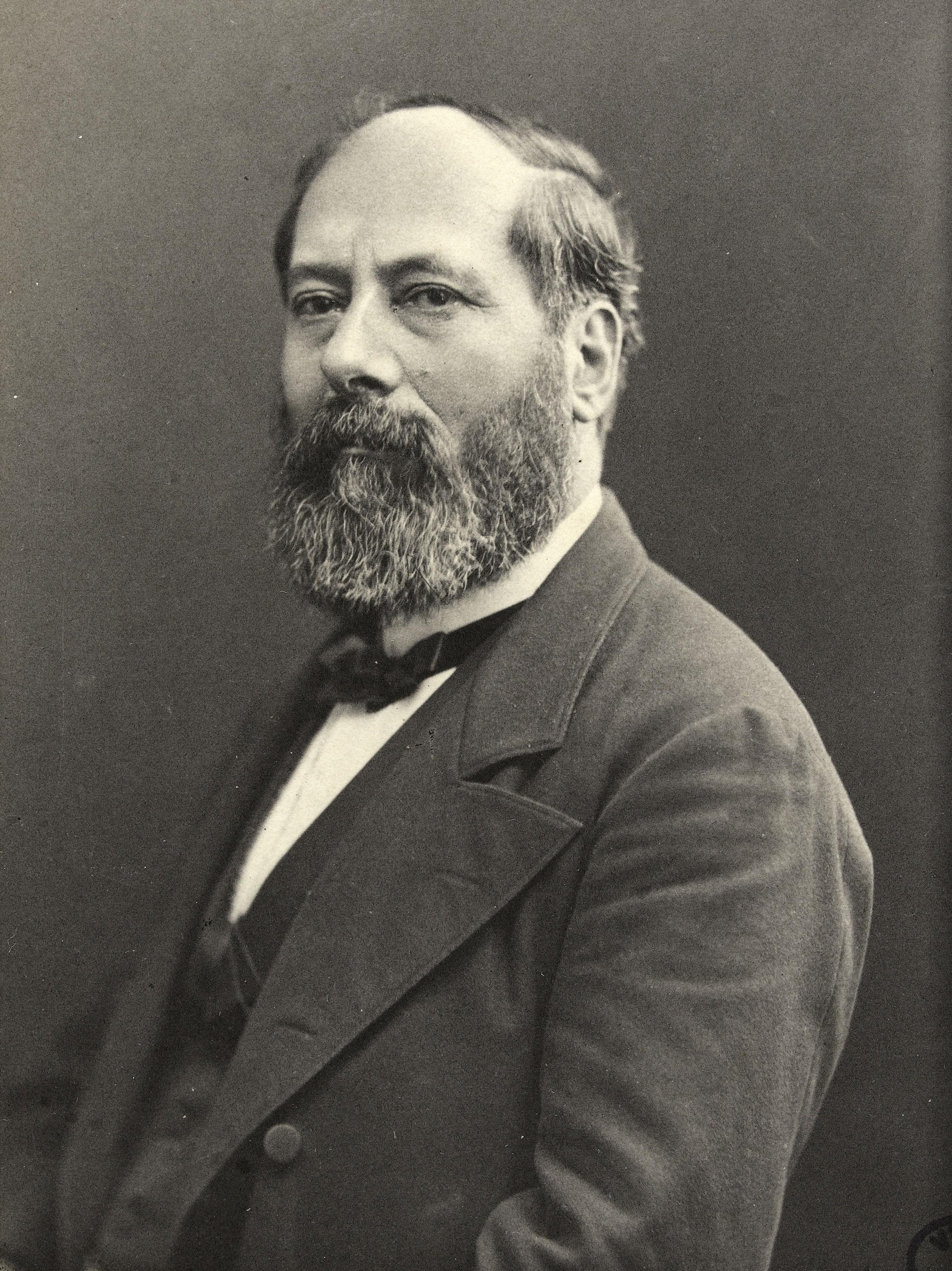

Minister of Finance of France
- In office 14 November 1881 – 30 January 1882
- President: Jules Grévy
- Prime Minister: Léon Gambetta
- Preceded by: Pierre Magnin
- Succeeded by: Léon Say

Minister of the Interior
- In office 4 April 1885 – 7 January 1886
- President: Jules Grévy
- Prime Minister: Henri Brisson
- Preceded by: Pierre Waldeck-Rousseau
- Succeeded by: Ferdinand Sarrien

Member of the French Chamber of Deputies
- In office 5 March 1876 – 14 October 1889
- Constituency: Seine (1876–77); Seine (1877–81); Seine (1881–85); Seine (1885–89)

Personal details
- Born: 17 May 1832 Angers, France
- Died: 16 July 1902 (aged 70) Château de Targé near Parnay, France
- Party: Moderate Republican (1863–1869); Republican far-left (1869–1871); Republican Union (1871–1889)
- Profession: Lawyer; journalist

François Henri René Allain-Targé (17 May 1832 – 16 July 1902) was a French politician of the French Third Republic. He served as Minister of finance under Léon Gambetta and Minister of the interior under Henri Brisson.

== Early life and career ==
Allain-Targé was born in Angers in an affluent family of magistrates. The son of a procureur général, he studied law in Poitiers and settled as a lawyer in his hometown in 1853. In 1857 he married Geneviève Villemain, a daughter of Abel-François Villemain, with whom he had two daughters. After holding the post of deputy-procureur from 1861 to 1864, he moved to Paris, where he became a contributor to newspapers opposed to Napoleon III.

In 1868, he joined the editorial staff of the Republican newspaper L'Avenir national and, together with Léon Gambetta, Paul Challemel-Lacour, Eugène Spuller and others, founded the Revue politique, which was suppressed after a few months. In the 1869 French legislative election, he ran unsuccessfully in Maine-et-Loire against the outgoing deputy Charles Louvet.

== Franco-Prussian War ==
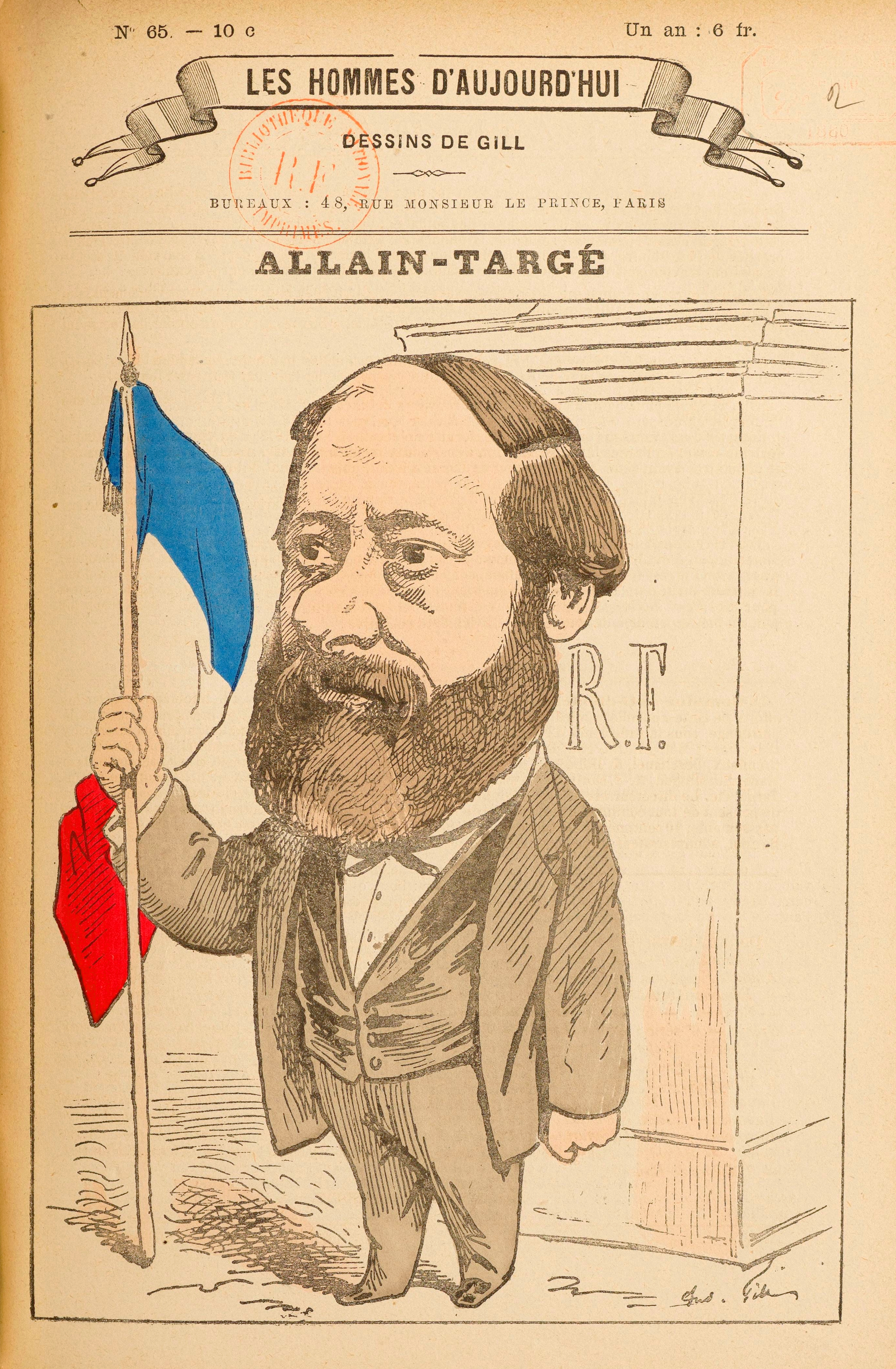
Portrait by André Gill in Les Hommes d'aujourd'hui, 1880.

After the fall of the Second French Empire and Napoleon III in September 1870 in the midst of the Franco-Prussian War, Allain-Targé was appointed prefect of the department of Maine-et-Loire, then served as army commissioner and accompanied Gambetta to Bordeaux, when he left Paris and the seat of government was transferred to that town, as prefect of Gironde.

Like Gambetta, he was in favour of defending France to the utmost in the Franco-Prussian War and, when the election of a new National Assembly on 8 February 1871 turned out to be largely conservative, and having failed to gain a seat in 1871 French legislative election, he resigned. On 30 July 1871, he was elected as a radical member of the Municipal Council of Paris. With Gambetta he also founded the daily newspaper La République française in November 1871, for which he wrote until 1878.

== Chamber of Deputies ==
In the 1876 French legislative election, Allain-Targé was elected to the Chamber of Deputies, where, as a loyal supporter of Gambetta, he belonged to the Union républicaine faction and gained great influence as party leader, especially since President MacMahon's resignation in 1879. He was re-elected in 1877, 1881 and 1885.

A staunch opponent of agreements with the private railway companies, he advocated a state takeover. Eventually he championed a solution that proposed the repurchase of small lines in difficulties, but the continuation of the big railway companies with increased state monitoring on all sectors of the railway system, including ticket prices, construction and exploitation. The amendment was passed in March 1877 in both Houses; and is considered to be the upshot to the Freycinet Plan.

When Gambetta took over the premiership on 14 November 1881, he put Allain-Targé in charge of the finance ministry. With Gambetta, Allain-Targé also resigned as early as 26 January 1882. In Henri Brisson's government, he served as Minister of the Interior from 6 April to 29 December 1885.

== Retired and death ==
In the 1889 French legislative election in September/October, he no longer received a mandate as a deputy and, affected by the death of his wife in 1884 and his daughter (who had married Charles Ferry, the younger brother of Prime Minister Jules Ferry), in 1886, he decided to retire from politics. He died on 16 July 1902 at the age of 70 in the Chateau de Targé close to Parnay (Maine-et-Loire), where the family owned a castle.

Preceded by Pierre Magnin	Minister of Finance of France; November 14, 1881 – January 30, 1882	Succeeded by Léon Say
Preceded by Pierre Waldeck-Rousseau	Minister of the Interior of France; April 6, 1885 – January 7, 1886	Succeeded by Ferdinand Sarrien

== Sources ==
- Lenoir, Olivier (2020). The Belle Époque of the railways: the Freycinet plan and its effects on the French population and economy (Master's Thesis). Paris School of Economics/École normale supérieure.
- Mitchell, Allan (2000). The Great Train Race: Railways and the Franco-German Rivalry, 1815-1914. New York/Oxford: Berghahn Books. ISBN 978-1-57181-166-0.
- Port, Célestin (1965), H. Siraudeau et Cie (ed.), Dictionnaire historique, géographique et biographique de Maine-et-Loire et de l'ancienne province d'Anjou, vol. 1 (A-C) (2nd ed.), Angers, BNF 331411051
- "François Allain-Targé", in Adolphe Robert and Gaston Cougny, Dictionnaire des parlementaires français (1789–1891), Bourloton, Paris, 1889 Edition details Wikisource
