= Camille Pelletan =

French politician, historian and journalist

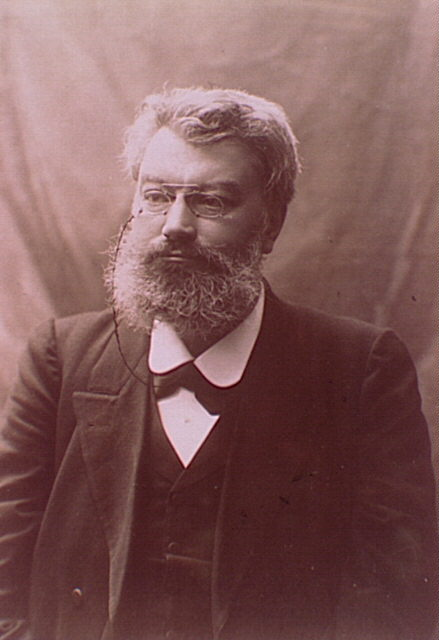
Camille Pelletan, French politician and journalist

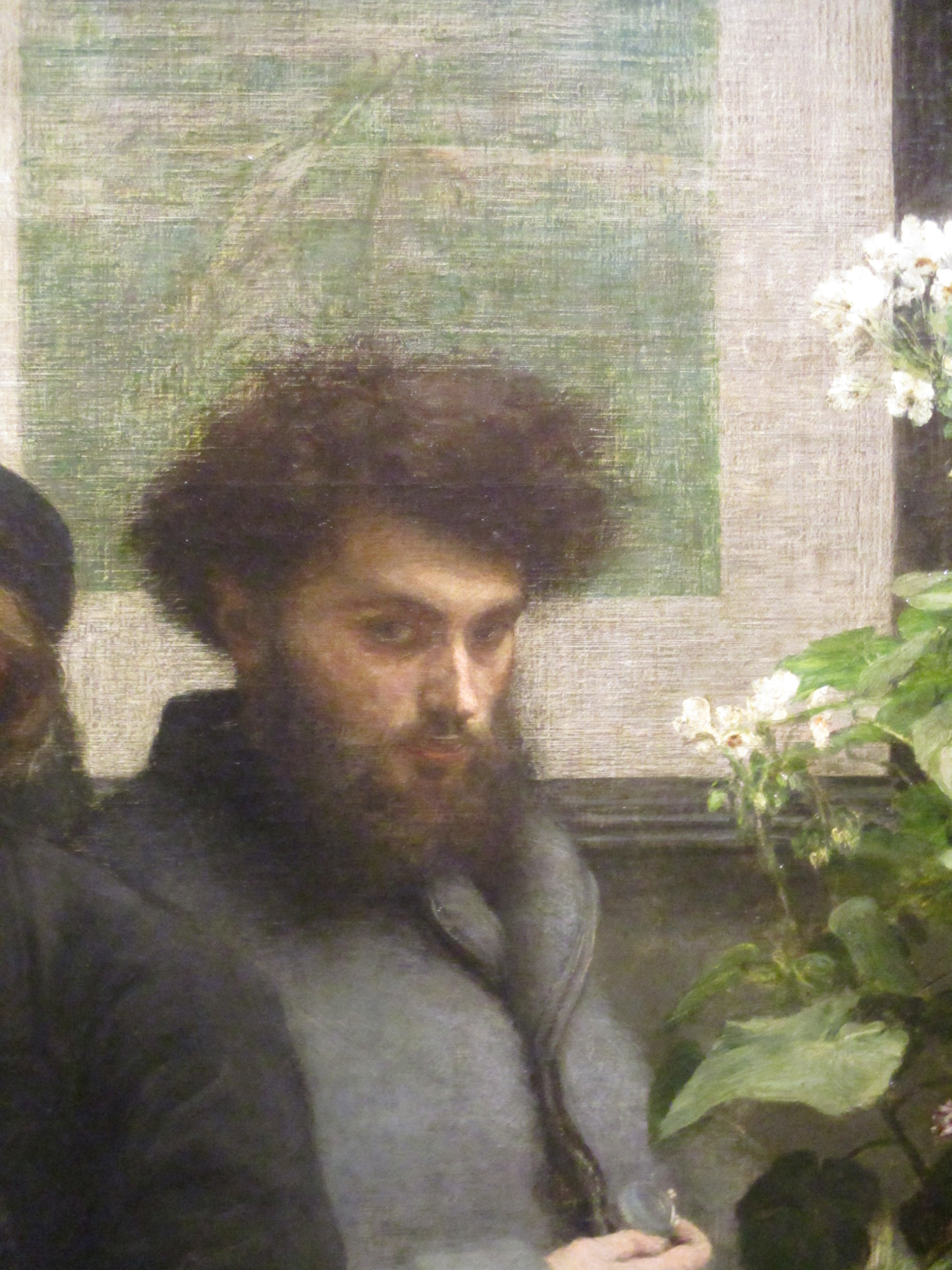
Pelletan as a young man: Detail of the painting The Corner of the Table (1872) by Fantin-Latour

Charles Camille Pelletan (28 June 1846 – 4 June 1915) was a French politician, historian and journalist, Minister of Marine in Emile Combes' Bloc des gauches (Left-Wing Blocks) cabinet from 1902 to 1905. He was part of the left wing of the Republican, Radical and Radical-Socialist Party, created in 1902.

== Biography ==
Pelletan was born in Paris, the son of Eugène Pelletan (1813–1884), a writer of some distinction and a noted opponent of the Second Empire.

Camille Pelletan was educated in Paris, passed as licentiate in laws, and studied at the École Nationale des Chartes where he was qualified as an "archiviste paléographe". At the age of twenty he became an active journalist, and a bitter critic of the Imperial Government. After the war of 1870-71 he took a leading place among the Radicals, as an opponent of the "Opportunist Republicans" who continued the policy of Léon Gambetta. He was parliamentary editor for Le Rappel until 1871, when he was succeeded by Alfred Gaulier. In 1880 he became editor of Justice, and worked with success to bring about a revision of the sentences passed on the Communards. In 1881 he was elected a deputy for the 10th arrondissement of Paris, and in 1885 for the Bouches-du-Rhône département, being reelected in 1889, 1893 and 1898; and he was repeatedly chosen as reporter to the various bureaus.

During the Dreyfus Affair he fought vigorously on behalf of the Republican government and when the coalition known as the Bloc des gauches (Left-Wings Block) was formed he took his place as a Radical leader, becoming a member of the Republican, Radical and Radical-Socialist Party at its creation in 1902, and taking place at its left-wing.

He was nominated as Minister of Marine in the Bloc des gauches cabinet of Émile Combes (June 1902 to January 1905), but his administration was severely criticized, notably by Jean Marie Antoine de Lanessan and other naval experts. During the great sailors strike at Marseille in 1904 he showed pronounced sympathy with the socialistic aims and methods of the strikers, and a strong feeling was aroused that his Radical sympathies tended to a serious weakening of the navy and to destruction of discipline. A somewhat violent controversy resulted, in the course of which Pelletan's indiscreet speeches did him no good; and he became a common subject for ill-natured caricatures.

Caricatures of Camille Pelletan, 1904

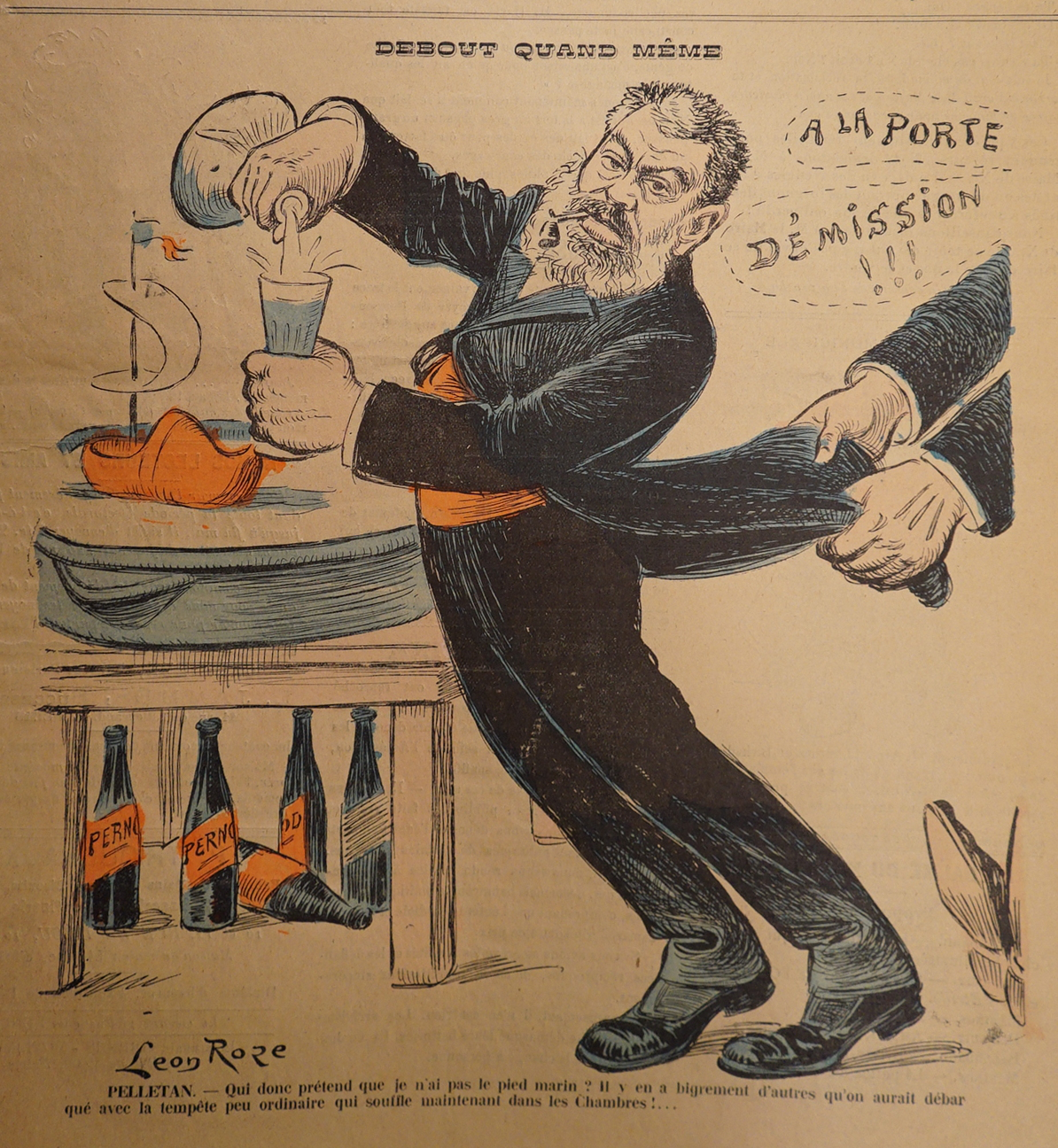

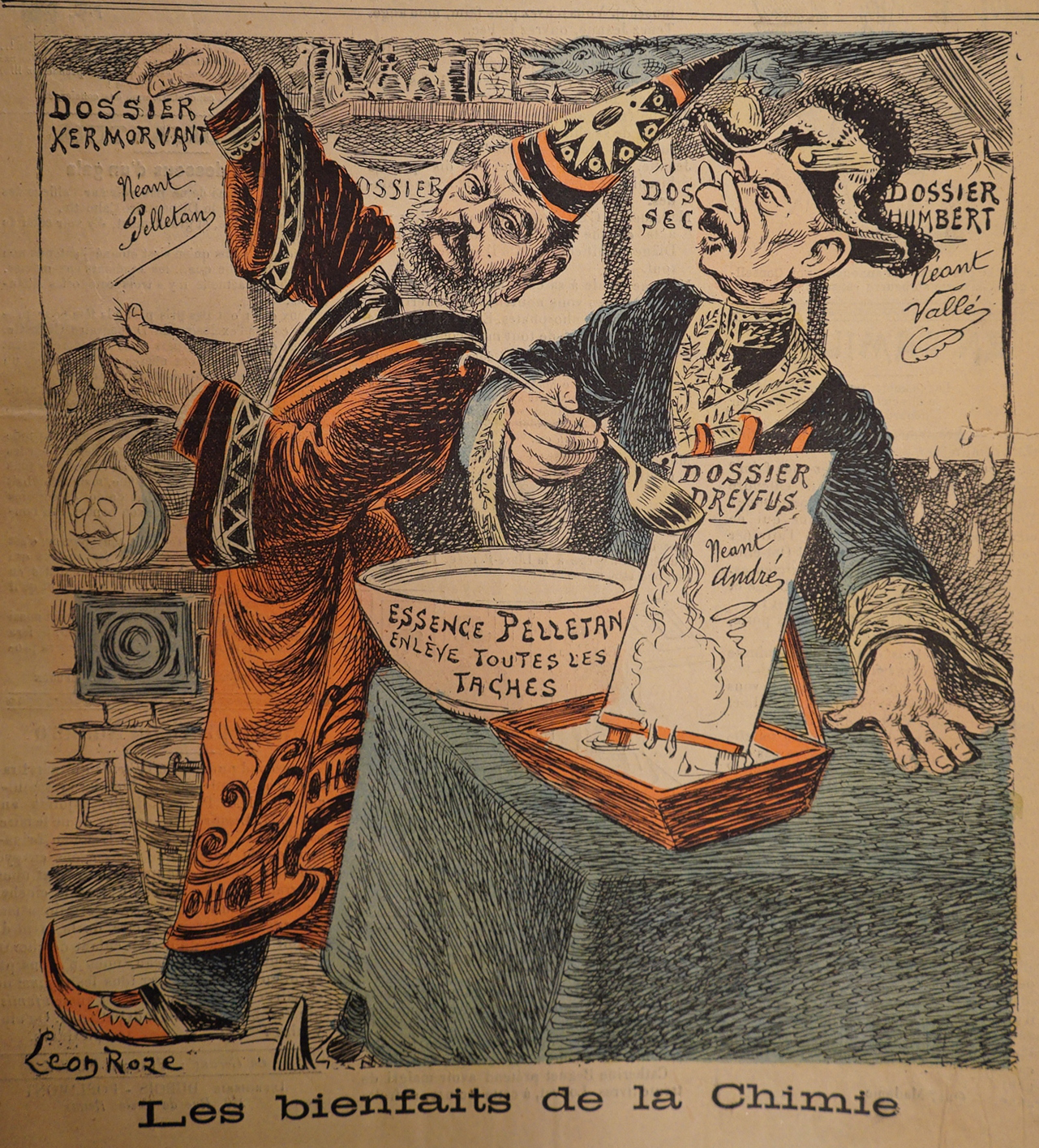

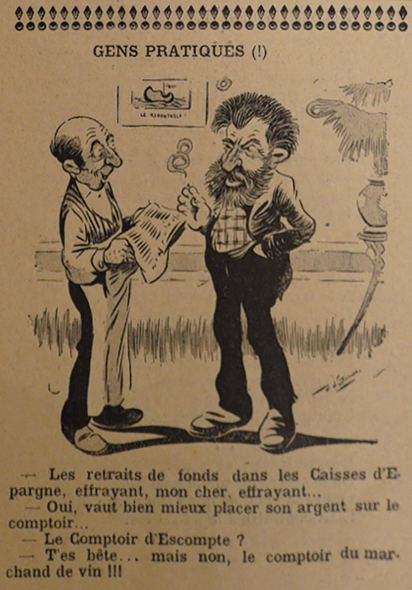

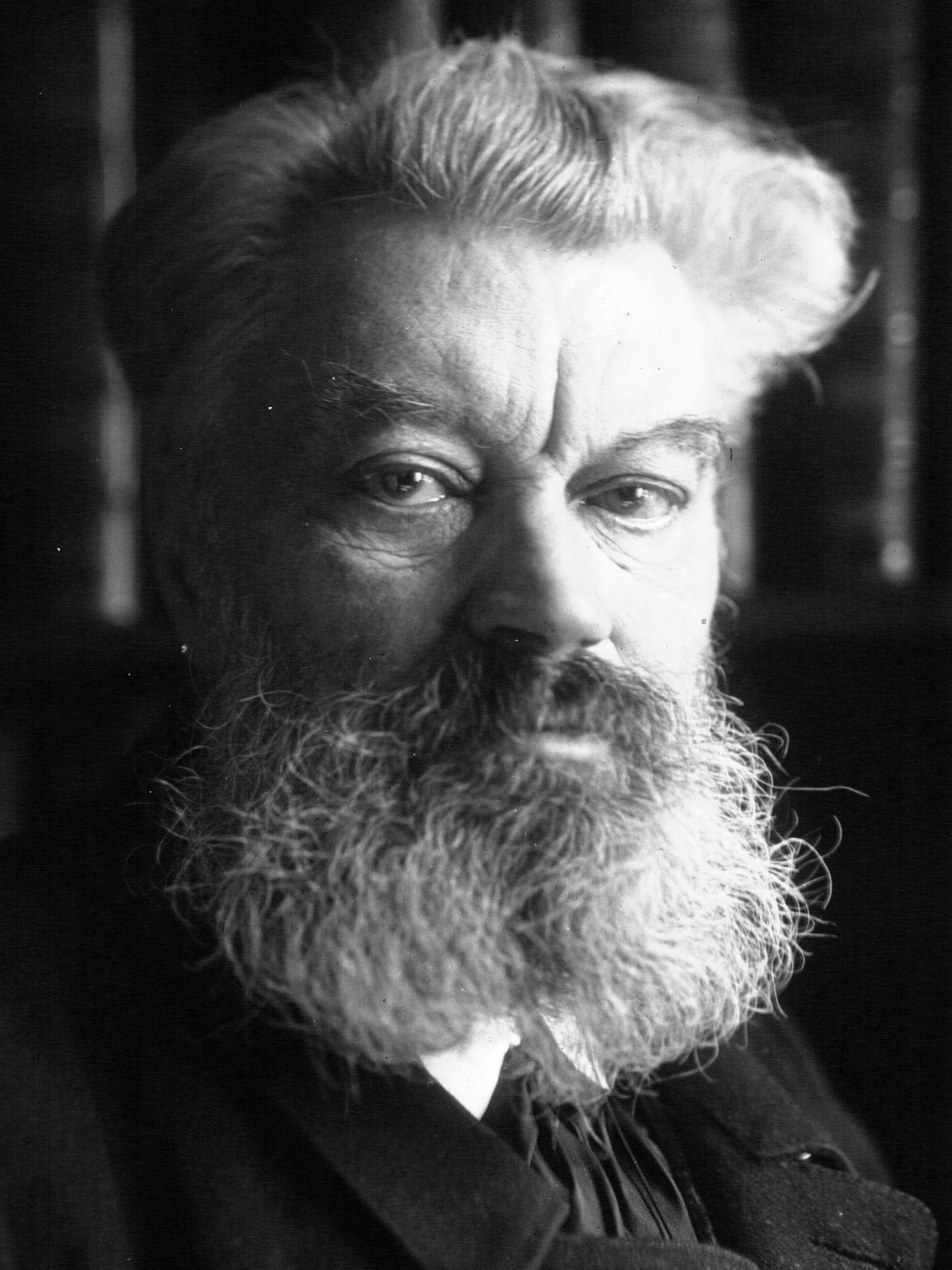
Camille Pelletan the year before he died

On the fall of the Combes ministry he became less prominent in French politics. A deputy again for the Bouches du Rhône (until 1912), he voted on 3 July 1905 the 1905 French law on the Separation of the Churches and the State. From 1912 to 1915 he was a senator elected in the Bouches du Rhône electoral district.

Camille Pelletan's name was given to the Parti radical-socialiste Camille Pelletan, a left-wing offshoot of the Republican, Radical and Radical-Socialist Party created after the 6 February 1934 crisis by Gabriel Cudenet, who opposed the participation of several Radicals to the conservative cabinet of Gaston Doumergue, which had replaced the fallen Cartel des gauches (Left-Wings Cartel).

The Pelletan's family tree includes 11 parliamentarians, among whom are Georges Bonnet and Michel Debré.

US Naval officer Rear Admiral Bradley A. Fiske wrote of Pelletan in his autobiography From Midshipman to Rear Admiral, edited in 1919, that:

Instead of being a friend of the people, as so many French people thought, Camille Pelletan by his course was more dangerous to them than all the German spies in France put together. Camille Pelletan's course did more to break down the defense of the French Republic than a half a million German troops could have done.
