= Republican Union (France) =

Republican Union Union républicaine
- President: Léon Gambetta
- Founded: 1871; 155 years ago
- Dissolved: 1885; 141 years ago
- Preceded by: Moderate Republicans
- Ideology: Anti-clericalism; Liberalism (faction); Radicalism (faction); Republicanism
- Political position: Left-wing
- Colours: Red
- Politics of France; Political parties; Elections; Chamber(s): Chamber of Deputies and Senate; Legislature(s): 1st–4th of the Third Republic; Constituency: Member of Parliament for Seine

The Republican Union (French: Union républicaine, UR), later known as the Progressive Union (French: Union progressiste, UP), was a French parliamentary group founded in 1871 as a heterogeneous alliance of moderate radicals, former Communards and opponents of the French-Prussian Treaty.

== History ==
Formed in the early years of the French Third Republic, the Republican Union led by Léon Gambetta was strongly opposed to the Treaty of Frankfurt as much understanding to the Paris Commune, repressed by the moderate Adolphe Thiers. The party's electoral lists also included notable activists and intellectuals like Louis Blanc (elected with 216,000 votes), Victor Hugo, Giuseppe Garibaldi, Edgar Quinet, Pierre Waldeck-Rousseau, Émile Littré, Charles Floquet, Georges Clemenceau, Arthur Ranc and Gustave Courbet.

Initially on the extreme left of the Parliament of France, the group became close to the Opportunist Republicans of Jules Ferry in the late 1870s, causing a split of the far-left radicals led by Clemenceu. During the Gambetta government (1881–1882), René Goblet also broke away from the group to form the Radical Left.

After the 1885 legislative election, the Republican Union's popularity decreased while the Opportunists to their right increased their votes. In 1894, one of the last prominent members of the group, Gustave Isambert, renamed the Republican Union as the Progressive Union and with an handful of deputies and senators continued to pursue Gambetta's goals. However, changes in the political system led to a need for a big party of all liberals and when the Democratic Republican Alliance was created in 1901 the Opportunists and the Progressive Union merged into it.

== Electoral history ==
=== Presidential elections ===
Election year	Candidate	No. of first round votes	% of 1st round vote	No. of second round votes	% of 2nd round vote	Won/Loss
1873	Jules Grévy	1	0.2%			Loss
1879	Léon Gambetta	5	0.7%			Loss
1885	Henri Brisson	68	11.8%			Loss
1887	Henri Brisson	26	3.0%			Loss
1894	Henri Brisson	195	23.1%			Loss
1894	Henri Brisson	195	43.0%	361	45.2%	Loss

=== Legislative elections ===
Chamber of Deputies
Election year	No. of overall votes	% of overall vote	No. of overall seats won	+/–	Leader
1871	Unknown (5th)	6.0%	38 / 638	New	Léon Gambetta
1876	1,359,435 (2nd)	18.4%	98 / 533	▲60	Léon Gambetta
1877	4,860,481 (1st)	60.0%	313 / 521	▲205	Jules Dufaure
1881	2,678,678 (1st)	37.3%	204 / 545	▼109	Léon Gambetta
1885	1,125,989 (2nd)	14.2%	83 / 584	▼121	Henri Brisson
1889	2,974,565 (1st)	37.4%	216 / 578	▲133	Charles Floquet

- a: Running unified with the Republican Left.

== See also ==
- Democratic Republican Alliance
- Sinistrisme
