= Marcel-Edmond Naegelen =

French politician

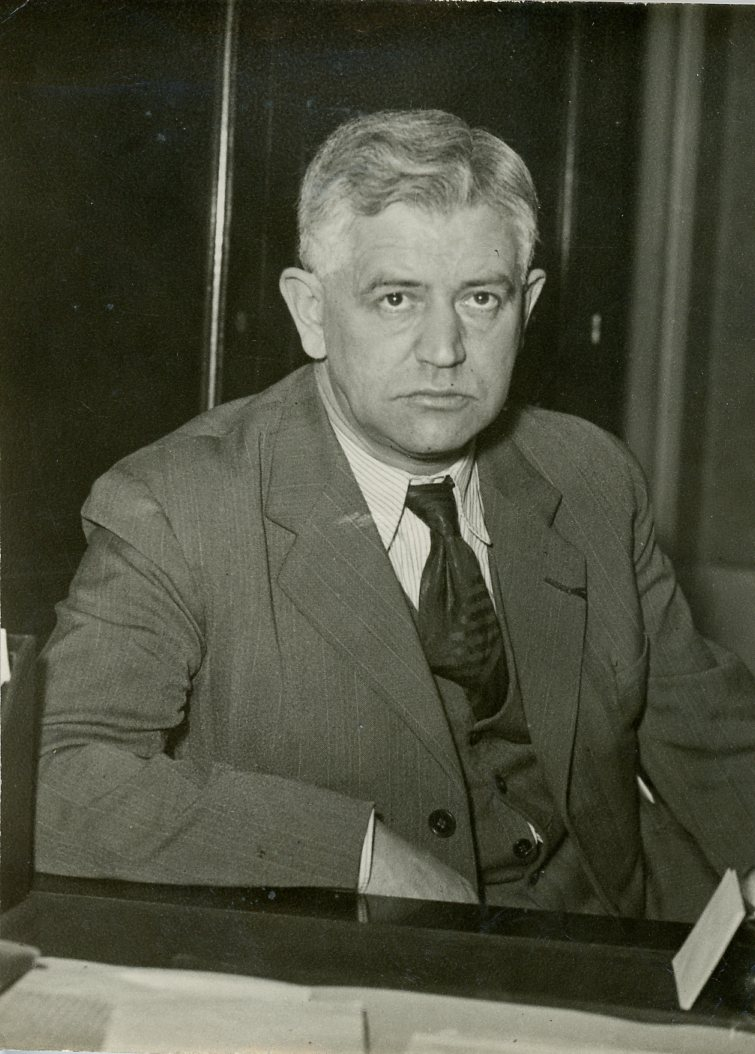
Marcel-Edmond Naegelen

Marcel-Edmond Naegelen (17 January 1892, Belfort – 15 April 1978, Paris) was a French politician. He represented the French Section of the Workers' International (SFIO) in the Constituent Assembly elected in 1945, in the Constituent Assembly elected in 1946 and in the National Assembly from 1946 to 1958. He was Minister of National Education from 1946 to 1948 and Governor General of French Algeria from 1948 to 1951. He accepted and justified the massive electoral fraud in favour of candidates favourable to the French administration in the elections of 1948 and 1951 to the second electoral college of the Algerian Assembly of French Algeria. In the 1953 French presidential election that went thirteen rounds, he led in the first, second and eleventh rounds before ultimately losing to René Coty.
