= 1876 French legislative election in Algeria =

Elections to the National Assembly of France were held in Algeria on 20 February 1876 as part of the wider National Assembly elections. At that time, Algeria had three representatives in the National Assembly.

== Results ==
Département	Party	Candidate	Votes	%	Notes
Algiers	Republican Left	François Gastu	5,822	64.7	Elected
Algiers	Far Left	César Bertholon	2,544	28.3	–
Algiers	Republican Left	Pages	525	5.8	–
Algiers	Republican Union	Charles Bourlier	102	1.1	–
Algiers		Invalid/blank votes	307	–	–
Algiers		Total	9,300	100	–
Constantine	Republican Left	Alexis Lambert^{[a]}	4,875	100	Elected
Constantine		Invalid/blank votes	531	–	–
Constantine		Total	5,406	100	–
Oran	Republican Union	Rémy Jacques	5,638	96.8	Elected
Oran	Republican Left	Debrousse	184	3.2	–
Oran		Invalid/blank votes	423	–	–
Oran		Total	6,245	100	–
Source: Sternberger et al., National Assembly of France.

^{[a]} Lambert died on 22 January 1877. In the second round of a by-election to replace him, held on 26 April 1877, Gaston Thomson was elected with 2,963 votes against 2,654 for Fawiter (a Radical) and 2,530 for Treille.

== See also ==
- 1876 French legislative election
