= 1876 French legislative election =

- 20 February and 5 March 1876

All 533 seats in the Chamber of Deputies 267 seats needed for a majority
- Turnout: 75.90%
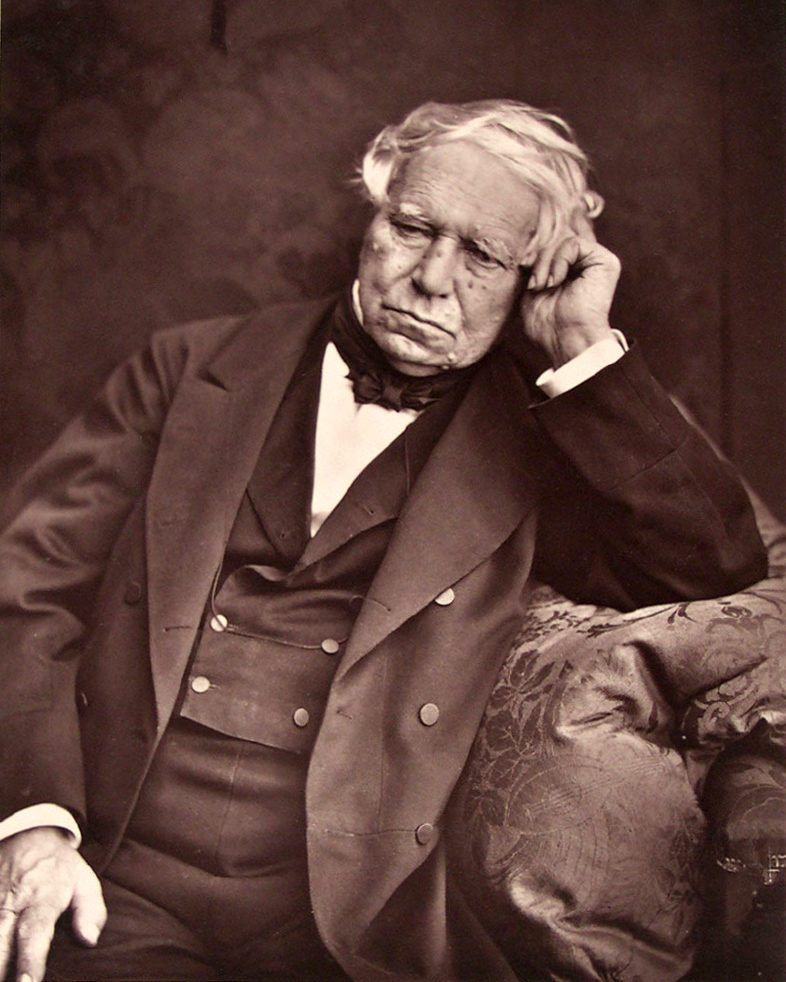

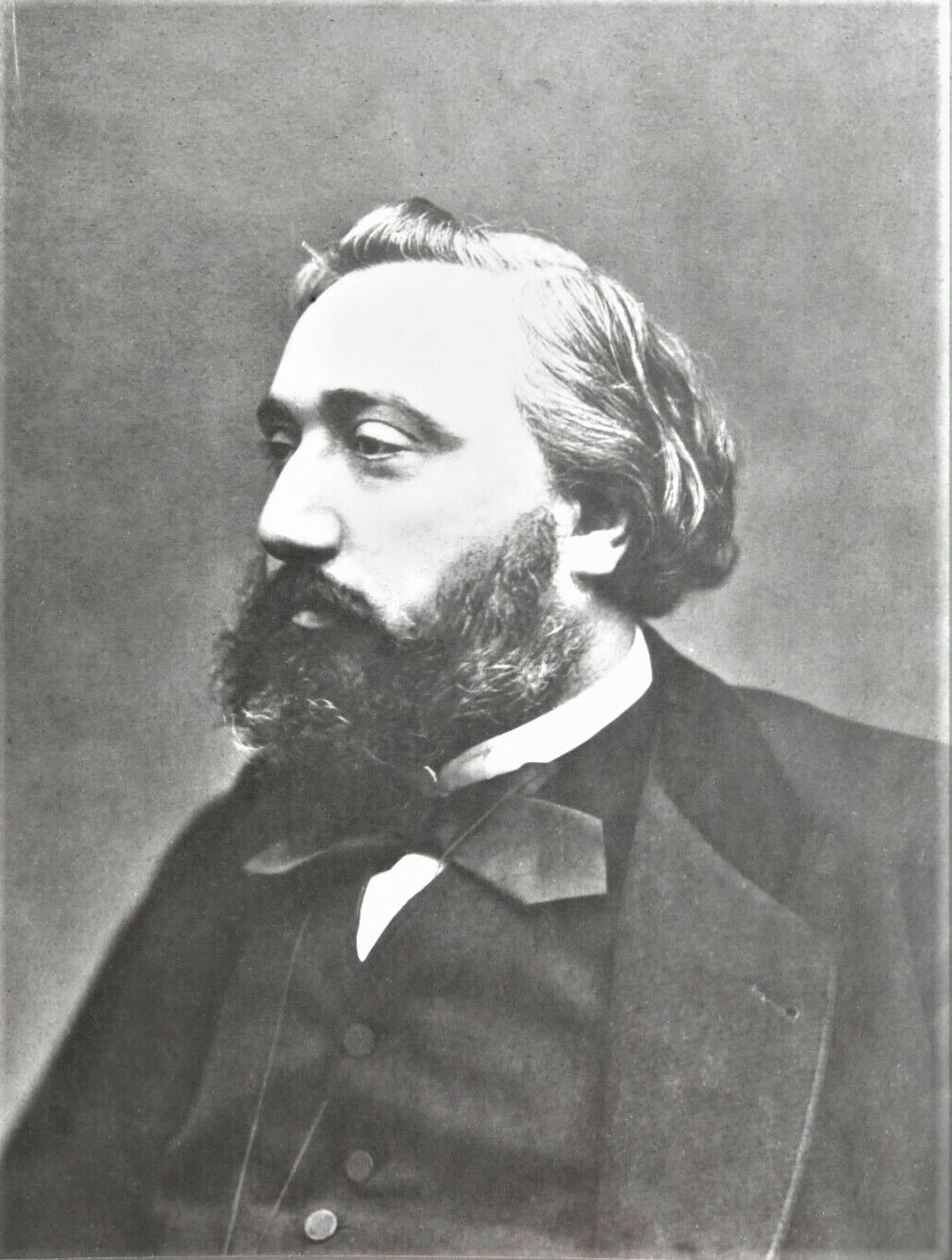

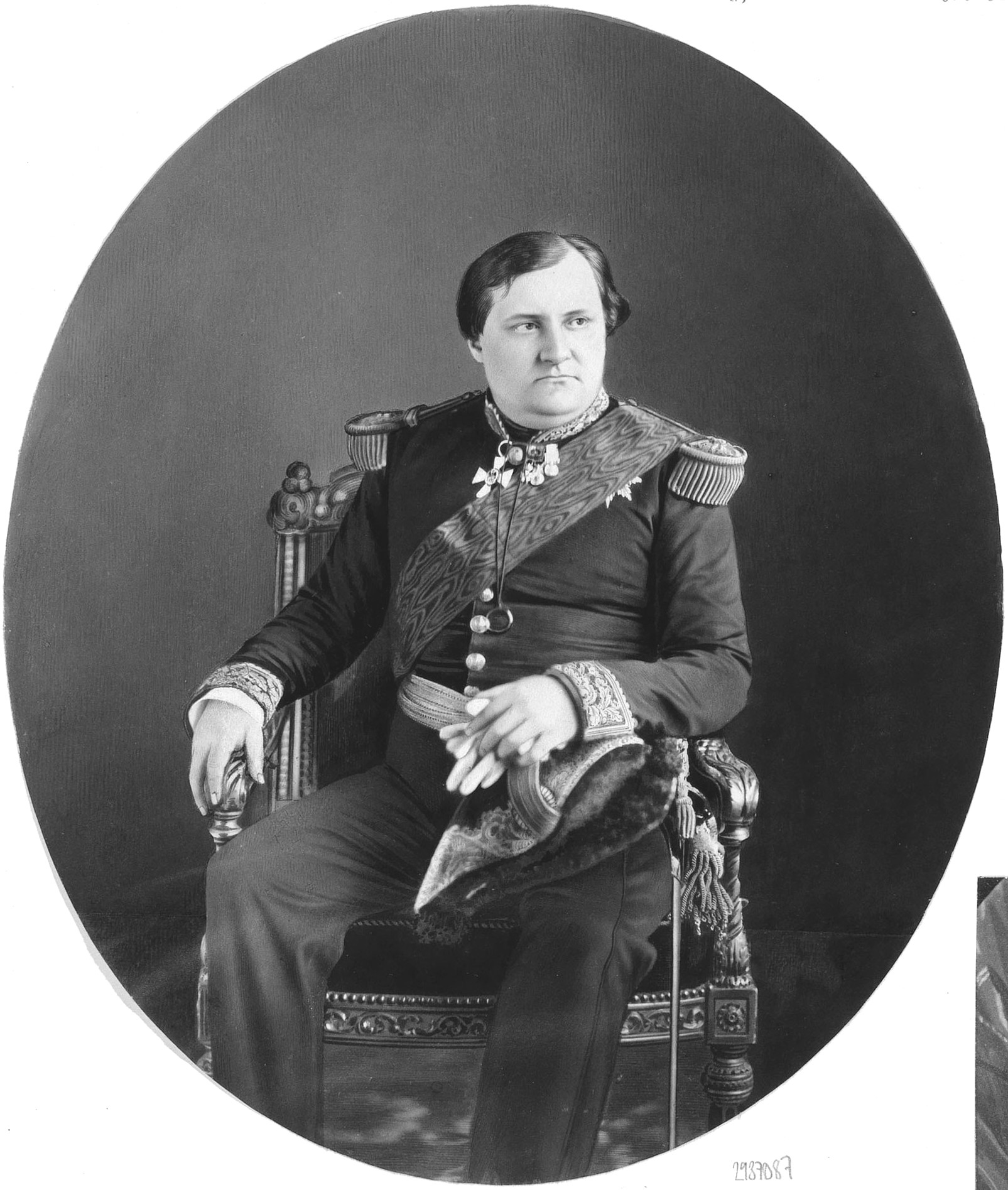
	First party	Second party	Third party
Leader	Jules Dufaure	Léon Gambetta	Napoléon-Jérôme Bonaparte
Party	Republican Left	Republican Union	Bonapartists
Seats won	193	98	76
- Results by district
Prime Minister before election
Louis Buffet
Monarchist
Elected Prime Minister
Jules Dufaure
Republican Left

Legislative elections were held in France on 20 February and 5 March 1876 to elect the members of the Chamber of Deputies, the lower chamber of the National Assembly. They were the first elections under the French Constitutional Laws of 1875.

The result was a victory for the Republicans. President Patrice MacMahon subsequently invited Jules Simon, who declared himself "resolutely republican and resolutely conservative", to form a government, but dismissed him on 16 May 1877, precipitating the Seize Mai crisis and further elections.

== Results ==
Graph of the party split among 357 seats.
Party	Votes	%	Seats
Republican Left			193
Republican Union			98
Bonapartists			76
Centre-left			48
Orléanist			40
Legitimists			24
Constitutionals			22
Moderate Republicans			17
Independents			15
Total			533
Total votes	7,388,234	–	
Registered voters/turnout	9,733,734	75.90	
Source: Rois et Presidents

== See also ==
- 1876 French legislative election in Algeria
- Alleged military conspiracy of 1877
