= Marcel Cachin =

French politician

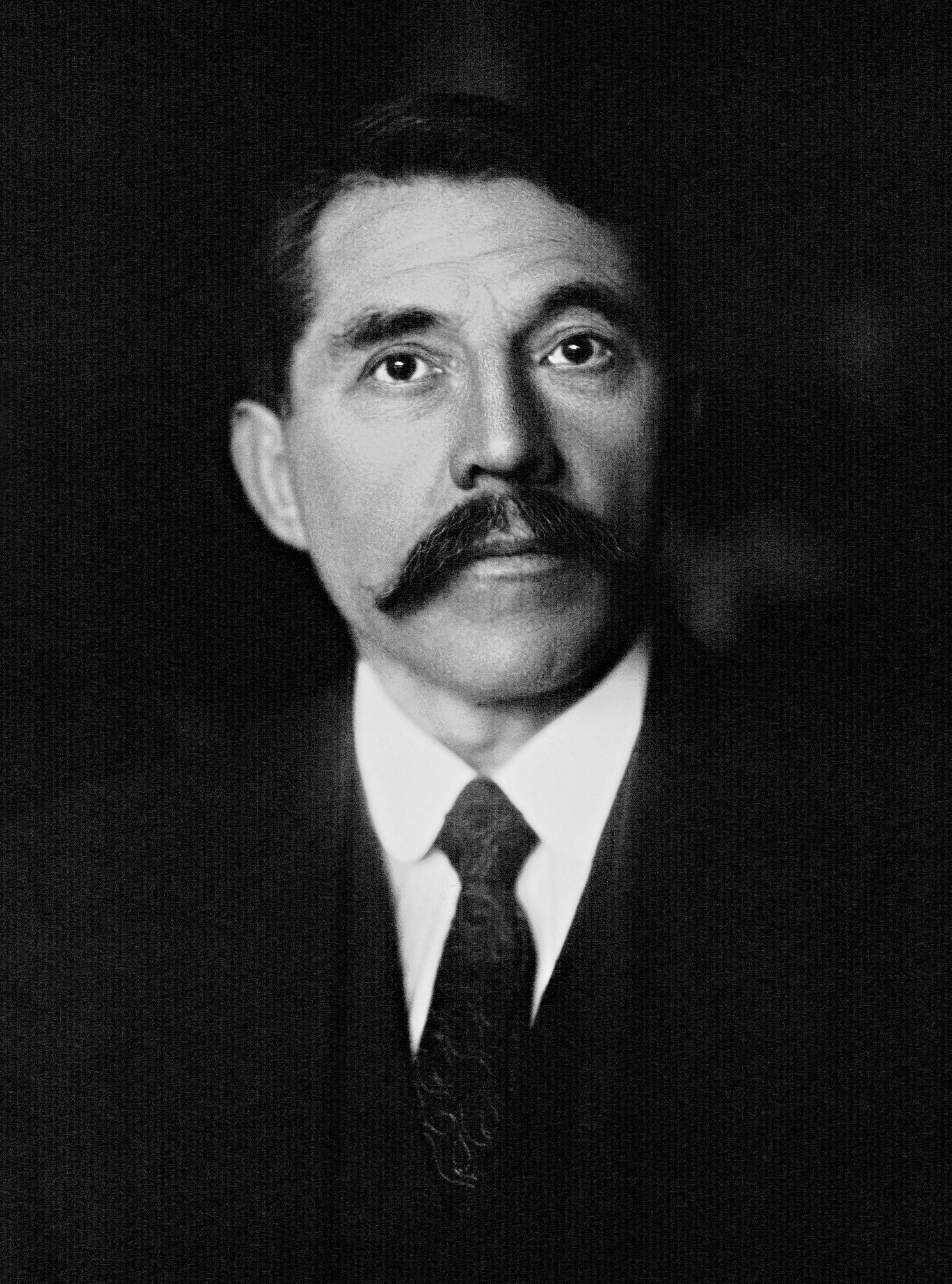
- Cachin in 1918

Member of the National Assembly for Seine's 2nd constituency
- In office 28 November 1946 – 12 February 1958
- Succeeded by: Alexis Thomas

Senator for Seine
- In office 14 January 1936 – 29 February 1940

Member of the Chamber of Deputies for Seine
- In office 1914–1932

Personal details
- Born: 20 September 1869 Paimpol, Côtes d'Armor, French Empire
- Died: 12 February 1958 (aged 88) Choisy-le-Roi, France
- Party: PCF (from 1921)
- Other political affiliations: SFIO (1914–1921)
- Occupation: Publisher, journalist, university lecturer

Marcel Cachin (20 September 1869 – 12 February 1958) was a French Communist politician and editor of the daily newspaper L'Humanité.

== Political career ==
In 1891, Cachin joined Jules Guesde's French Workers' Party (POF). In 1905, he joined the new French Section of the Workers' International (SFIO) and won election to the Chamber of Deputies, representing the Seine in 1914. He rallied the Union sacrée during the First World War and was sent to Russia in a mission in 1917. On that occasion, he strongly supported Alexander Kerensky's Provisional Government, which was pledged to continue Russia's participation in the war and denounced Vladimir Lenin and the Bolsheviks. In 1918, he was one of the speakers at a patriotic rally held at Strasbourg to celebrate the city's return to French rule.

However, following the end of the war, there was a leftward shift among Cachin's grassroots supporters and a growing sympathy for the October Revolution. In 1920, at the Tours Congress, Cachin became one of the founders of the French Communist Party (SFIC) and joined the Third International. In 1923, he was jailed for denouncing the French Occupation of the Ruhr and of Morocco.

As a strong supporter of the pro-Soviet Communist Party, he refused to disavow the Molotov–Ribbentrop Pact and was removed from elected office in 1940. After the Liberation of France, he returned to the National Assembly until his death in 1958.

He was the editor of the newspaper L'Humanité from 1918 to 1958.

At the age of 88, he was the first foreigner to receive the Order of Lenin. In the later part of his life, he was nicknamed the "Grandfather of the Communist Party".

His granddaughter, Françoise Cachin, was an art historian.

== Electoral results ==
Cachin was the candidate for President of France of the French Communist Party in four elections:

- 1931: 1.11% in the first round, 1.23% in the second round
- 1932: 0.97% in the first round
- 1939: 8.13% in the first round
- 1953: 12.18% in the first round

== Awards ==
- Order of the Brotherhood and Unity, 1st class (1946)

== Bibliography ==
- (in French) Biography on the French Senate website
