= 1889 French legislative election in Algeria =

Elections to the National Assembly of France were held in Algeria on 22 September 1889.

== Results ==
=== First constituency ===
Département	Candidate	First round		Second round		Notes
Département	Candidate	Votes	%	Votes	%	Notes
Algiers	Alfred Letellier	3,568	45.8	4,213	55.3	Elected
Algiers	Blasselle	1,686	21.6	–	–	–
Algiers	Fallet	1,163	14.9	–	–	–
Algiers	de Redon	1,036	13.3	–	–	–
Algiers	Soulery	338	4.3	–	–	–
Algiers	Paul Samary	–	–	3,408	44.7	–
Algiers	Invalid/blank votes		–	147	–	–
Algiers	Total	7,791	100	7,768	100	–
Constantine	Gaston Thomson	4,723	66.3	–	–	Elected
Constantine	Sterlin	1,526	21.4	–	–	–
Constantine	Noireterre	873	12.3	–	–	–
Constantine	Invalid/blank votes		–	–	–	–
Constantine	Total	7,122	100	–	–	–
Oran	Marcel Saint-Germain	4,274	65.2	–	–	Elected
Oran	Other candidate	2,278	34.8	–	–	–
Oran	Invalid/blank votes	184	–	–	–	–
Oran	Total	6,736	100	–	–	–
Source: Sternberger et al., National Assembly of France.

=== Second constituency ===
Département	Candidate	Votes	%	Notes
Algiers	Charles Bourlier	5,283		Elected
Algiers	M Samary	3,328		–
Algiers	Invalid/blank votes		–	–
Algiers	Total			–
Constantine	Dominique Forcioli	4,029	69.6	Elected
Constantine	Others	1,763	30.4	–
Constantine	Invalid/blank votes	314	–	–
Constantine	Total	6,106	100	–
Oran	Eugène Etienne	5,949	87.7	Elected
Oran	Leglay-Mauvrac	617	9.1	–
Oran	Other	214	–	–
Oran	Total	6,780	100	–
Source: Sternberger et al., National Assembly of France

== See also ==
- 1889 French legislative election
