= 1877 French legislative election in Algeria =

Election

Elections to the National Assembly of France were held in Algeria on 14 October 1877 as part of the wider National Assembly elections. All three seats had only one candidate.

== Results ==
Département	Candidate	Party	Votes	%	Notes
Algiers	François Gastu	Republican Left	10,356	100	Elected
Algiers	Invalid/blank votes		613	–	–
Algiers	Total		10,969	100	–
Algiers	Registered voters/turnout		17,809	61.6	–
Constantine	Gaston Thomson	Republican Union	6,497	100	Elected
Constantine	Invalid/blank votes		602	–	–
Constantine	Total		7,099	100	–
Constantine	Registered voters/turnout		12,678	55.8	–
Oran	Rémy Jacques	Republican Union	7,720	100	Elected
Oran	Invalid/blank votes		492	–	–
Oran	Total		8,212	100	–
Oran	Registered voters/turnout		13,324	61.6	–
Source: Sternberger et al.

== See also ==
- 1877 French legislative election
