= Moderate Republicans (France, 1871–1901) =

French liberal political faction

Moderate Republicans Républicains modérés
- Leader(s): Adolphe Thiers; Jules Dufaure; Jules Grévy; Jules Ferry; Jean Casimir-Perier; Pierre Waldeck-Rousseau
- Founded: February 12, 1871; 155 years ago
- Dissolved: October 21, 1901; 125 years ago
- Preceded by: Moderate Republicans
- Succeeded by: Democratic Republican Alliance
- Ideology: Liberalism (French); Secularism (French); Republicanism (French); Civic nationalism Before 1892: Anti-clericalism
- Political position: Before 1892: Centre-left (Note: However, Opportunist Republicans were also classified as "Left-wing" or "Centre".); After 1892: Centre-right (Note: Originally established as a centre-left movement, the party shifted to the centre-right following the 1892 "Ralliement". This movement, encouraged by Pope Leo XIII, led to an influx of conservative Catholic supporters into the Republican ranks.)
- Colours: Orange

The Moderates or Moderate Republicans (French: Républicains modérés), pejoratively labeled Opportunist Republicans (Républicains opportunistes), was a French political group active in the late 19th century during the Third French Republic. The leaders of the group included Adolphe Thiers, Jules Ferry, Jules Grévy, Henri Wallon and René Waldeck-Rousseau.

Ideologically, the Moderate Republicans have been described as both centre-left and centre-right.

During their existence, the Moderate Republicans were present in the French Parliament first under the name of Republican Left (Gauche républicaine) and after a fusion with radical republicans as the Democratic Union (Union démocratique).

They were further divided into the National Republican Association (Association nationale républicaine) and the Liberal Republican Union (Union libérale républicaine) in 1888 and 1889, respectively.

In their approach to social issues, Moderate Republicans (according to one study) ‘tended to deny the existence of a “social question”’ in France, but in actuality enacted several progressive reforms during their time in office.

== History ==
=== Origins ===
The Moderate Republicans were a large and heterogenous group started after the French Revolution of 1848. However, the group lost the legislative elections of 1849, finishing as the minority group in the National Assembly. After the Louis-Napoléon's coup d'état in 1851 and the birth of the Second French Empire in 1852, the Republicans took part in the parliamentary opposition along with the monarchists against the Bonapartist majority.

=== Divisions ===
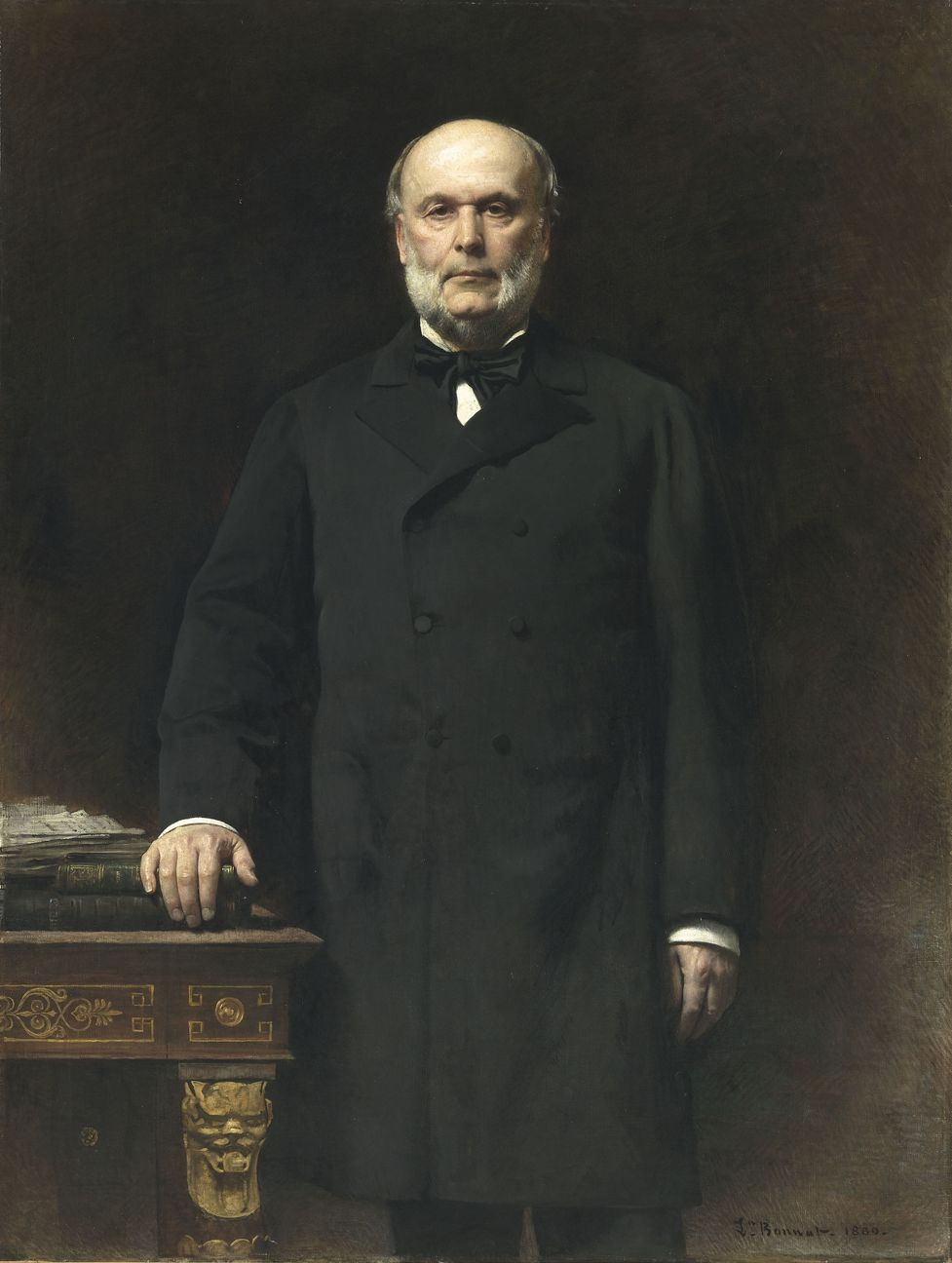
President Jules Grévy

After the Franco-Prussian War (1870–1871) and the consequential fall of the French Empire, the Third French Republic was born. However, its politics was divided in two groups, namely the right-wing monarchists (Orléanists and Legitimists) and the left-wing republicans (radicals and moderates). If both republicans were combined by anti-clericalism and social reformism, the radicals were mostly nationalist and anti-German, refusing the Treaty of Versailles with Prussia. The moderates instead supported the Treaty and were more pragmatic on international politics. After the legislative elections of 1871, the republicans inside the Chamber of Deputies split in two groups, namely the moderate Republican Left led by Jules Favre and the radical Republican Union led by Léon Gambetta. The two parliamentary groups were non-influential during the early years of the Republic, dominated by the monarchist Moral Order coalition of Patrice MacMahon, but after the failure of a return to the monarchy and after the legislative elections of 1876 the moderate and radical republicans gained 193 and 98 seats in the Chamber, respectively. From this time, the republicans maintained strong majorities in the French Parliament and were pejoratively called Opportunists by their detractors for their aptitude to gain the popular consensus in spite of any ideology.

=== Moving to the right ===
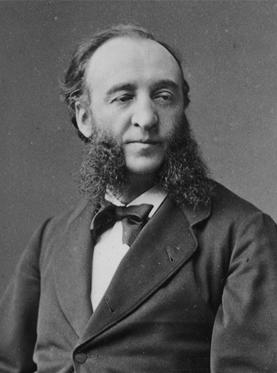
Prime Minister Jules Ferry, who resigned in 1885 after a political scandal called the Tonkin Affair

In January 1879, the Republican Jules Grévy was elected as President of the Republic, succeeding the Monarchist MacMahon. From this time, with the progressive disappearance of the Monarchists the moderates began to move toward the parliamentary centre between the old rights (Bonapartist and reunited monarchists) and the new lefts (radical-socialists, Marxists and Blanquists). To prevent the creation of a socialist state, the two radical and moderate republicans spirits decided to cooperate and form common governments despite the personal antagonism between Grévy and Gambetta, who died in 1882.

During the late 1870s and 1880s, the Republican majority launched an education reform with the Bert Law, creating the normal schools; and the Ferry Laws, that secularize public education. However, Grévy also signed the so-called Lois scélérates ("villainous laws") that restricted the freedom of the press and France started a colonial expansion in Africa, creating protectorates in Madagascar and Tunisia. Despite these semi-authoritarian policies, the republicans refused to be charged with conservatism and continued to proclaim themselves of the left, republicanism in France being historically associated with the left-wing. This paradox was later identified as sinistrisme ("leftism").

In the legislative elections of 1885, the republicans obtained a solid majority in the Chamber. In fact, until the election the two republican groups had been reunited in a new political party guided by President Grévy and his close ally Jules Ferry, namely the Democratic Union, born of the fusion of the Republican Left and the Republican Union. However, the republican Prime Minister Ferry was forced to resign in 1885 after a political scandal known as the Tonkin Affair and President Grévy also resigned his office in 1887 after a corruption scandal involving his son-in-law. The Moderate Republicans, seriously challenged, survived only thanks to the support of the Radical Republicans of René Goblet and worries about the rise of a new political phenomenon called revanchism, the desire for revenge against the German Empire after the defeat of 1871.

=== Final divisions and decline ===
National Republican Association Association nationale républicaine
- Chairman(s): Maurice Rouvier (1888–1889); Jules Ferry (1889–1893); Eugène Spuller (1893); Honoré Audiffred (1893–1903)
- Founder: Jules Ferry
- Founded: 19 February 1888; 138 years ago
- Dissolved: 1 November 1903; 122 years ago
- Preceded by: Moderate Republicans
- Merged into: Republican Federation
- Headquarters: 51, rue Vivienne, Paris
- Membership (1889): 5,000–10,000
- Ideology: Anti-Boulangism; Liberalism (French); Republicanism (French); Liberal conservatism
- Political position: Centre-right
- Colours: Blue
- Politics of France; Political parties; Elections; Staff (1888) ca. 110

The revanchist ideas were strong in the France of the Belle Époque and with the scandals involving the republican governments there was a rise of the nationalist party led by General Georges Boulanger. Boulanger was Minister of War from 1886 to 1887. His appointment was a strategy of Prime Minister Goblet to pledge the nationalists, but after the fall of his cabinet he was replaced by Maurice Rouvier and the General was not reconfirmed. This political error started the political phase called Boulangisme (1887–1891). Around the General was forming a heterogeneous group of supporters, including radical reformers like Georges Clemenceau and Charles de Freycinet; Bonapartists and monarchists who wanted to overthrow the Republic; socialists like Édouard Vaillant, who admired the General's views on workers' rights; and nationalists who desired revenge against Germany. Finally, Boulanger personally led the League of Patriots, a far-right revanchist and militarist league and benefitted from popular and financial support by workers and aristocrats, respectively.

In the face of the rise of Boulanger, the republican leaders were divided. From one side, the old republican moderate wing, composed by prominent personalities like Jules Ferry, Maurice Rouvier and Eugène Spuller, representing the middle bourgeoisie, industrialists and scholars, formed the National Republican Association (ANR) in 1888. To the other side, the republican right-wing of Henri Barboux and Léon Say, who represented the interests of the rich bourgeoisie and Catholics, formed the Liberal Republican Union in 1889. Continuing to depict itself as leftist, the ANR was a conservative group opposing the income tax and strikes that tried to defend the Republic from its reputed enemy Boulanger and used many banquets to finance his activities. Finally, there was a rupture inside the Boulangist party, namely the Radicals of Clemenceau, who disenchanted by the militarism of Boulanger launched the Society of the Rights of Man and of the Citizen and the socialists became disappointed by Boulanger's frequentation of monarchists like the Duchess of Uzès and Prince Napoléon Bonaparte, also themselves disappointed by Boulanger's republican ideas. The coup de grâce to Boulangisme arrived when he was accused of preparing a coup d'état, causing his flight to Brussels and a republican landslide in the 1889.

In the 1890s, the Moderate Republican parable ended as the Panama scandals of 1892 involved prominent Radical politicians like Clemenceau, Alfred Naquet and Léon Bourgeois, granting a large victory to the ANR in the legislative elections the following year. However, the Dreyfus affair broke out in 1893, causing the formation of two factions, namely the Dreyfusards like Émile Zola, Anatole France and Clemenceau who supported the innocence of the Jewish Colonel and the Anti-Dreyfusard like Édouard Drumont, Jules Méline and Raymond Poincaré who accused Dreyfus of betrayal, partially due to rampant antisemitism. The ANR, which Méline and Poincaré were members of, refused the antisemitic thesis, but took side with the Anti-Dreyfus field. This decision was fatal for the ANR's destiny. In 1899, the re-conviction of the Colonel Dreyfus, with a partial pardon favored by the republican Pierre Waldeck-Rousseau, caused divisions inside the ANR, aggravated by the rehabilitation of Dreyfus in 1900. To remove the mole of antisemitism, Waldeck-Rousseau founded the Democratic Republican Alliance (ADR) in 1901, claiming the heritage of Ferry and Gambetta. Many Moderate Republicans joined the ADR, including Yves Guyot, Ferdinand Dreyfus (not linked with the Colonel), Narcisse Leven and David Raynal. The Moderate Republicans who had remained in the ANR finally adhered along with Progressive Republicans to the Republican Federation, a right-wing party very distant from the original ANR's beliefs.

== Prominent members ==
- Édouard Barbey
- Frédéric Auguste Bartholdi
- Louis Barthou
- Marie François Sadi Carnot
- Jean Casimir-Perier
- Jacques Godefroy Cavaignac
- Gustave Denis
- Paul Deschanel
- Paul Devès
- Ferdinand Dreyfus
- Jules Armand Dufaure
- Armand Fallières
- Charles Ferry
- Jules Ferry
- Charles Friedel
- Jules Grévy
- James de Kerjégu
- Narcisse Leven
- Georges Leygues
- Émile Loubet
- Jean Macé
- Louis Marchegay
- Émile Maruéjouls
- Félix Martin-Feuillée
- Alfred Mézières
- Victor Milliard
- Raymond Poincaré
- David Raynal
- Joseph Reinach
- Maurice Rouvier
- Jules Siegfried
- Eugène Spuller
- Ludovic Trarieux
- Georges Trouillot
- Louis-Léger Vauthier
- Geoffroy Velten
- René Waldeck-Rousseau
- Henri-Alexandre Wallon

== Electoral results ==
=== Presidential elections ===
Election year	Candidate	No. of first round votes	% of first round vote	No. of second round votes	% of second round vote	Won/Loss
1873	Jules Grévy	1	0.3%			Loss
1879	Jules Grévy	563	84.0%			Won
1885	Jules Grévy	457	79.4%			Won
1887	François Sadi Carnot	303	35.7%	616	75.0%	Won
1894	Jean Casimir-Perier	451	53.4%			Won
1895	Pierre Waldeck-Rousseau	184	23.8%			Loss
1899	Émile Loubet	483	59.5%			Won

=== Legislative elections ===
Chamber of Deputies
Election year	No. of overall votes	% of overall vote	No. of overall seats won	+/–	Leader
1871	Unknown (3rd)	17.5%	112 / 638	New	Jules Grévy
1876	2,674,540 (1st)	36.2%	193 / 533	▲81	Jules Dufaure
1877	4,860,481 (1st)	60.0%	313 / 521	▲120	Jules Dufaure
1881	2,226,247 (2nd)	31.0%	168 / 545	▼145	Jules Ferry
1885	2,711,890 (1st)	34.2%	200 / 584	▲32	Jules Ferry
1889	2,974,565 (1st)	37.4%	216 / 578	▲16	Jean Casimir-Perier
1893	3,608,722 (1st)	48.6%	279 / 574	▲63	Jean Casimir-Perier
1898	3,518,057 (1st)	43.4%	254 / 585	▼25	Jules Méline
a: Presented as coalition of Republican Left and Republican Union; b: Under the label of Democratic Union; c: Under the label of Progressives

== See also ==
- France during the 19th century
- History of the Left in France
- Opportunism
- Politics of France
- Purge of the French Civil Service (1879-1884)
- Sinistrisme

== Bibliography ==
- Abel Bonnard (1936). Les Modérés. Grasset. 330 p.
- Francois Roth (dir.) (2003). Les modérés dans la vie politique française (1870-1965). Nancy: University of Nancy Press. 562 p. ISBN 2-86480-726-2.
- Gilles Dumont, Bernard Dumont and Christophe Réveillard (dir.) (2007). La culture du refus de l’ennemi. Modérantisme et religion au seuil du XXIe siècle. University of Limoges Press. Bibliothèque européenne des idées. 150 p.
