= 1881 French legislative election =

- 21 August and 4 September 1881

All 545 seats in the Chamber of Deputies 273 seats needed for a majority
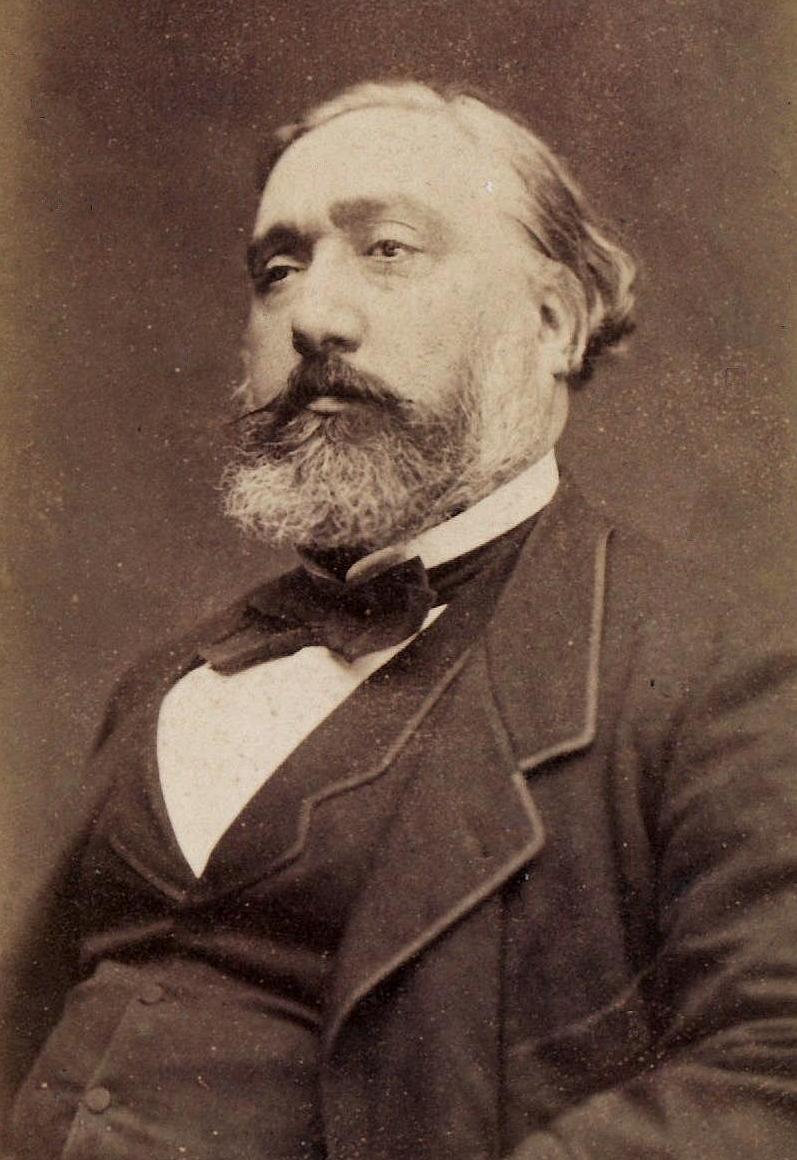

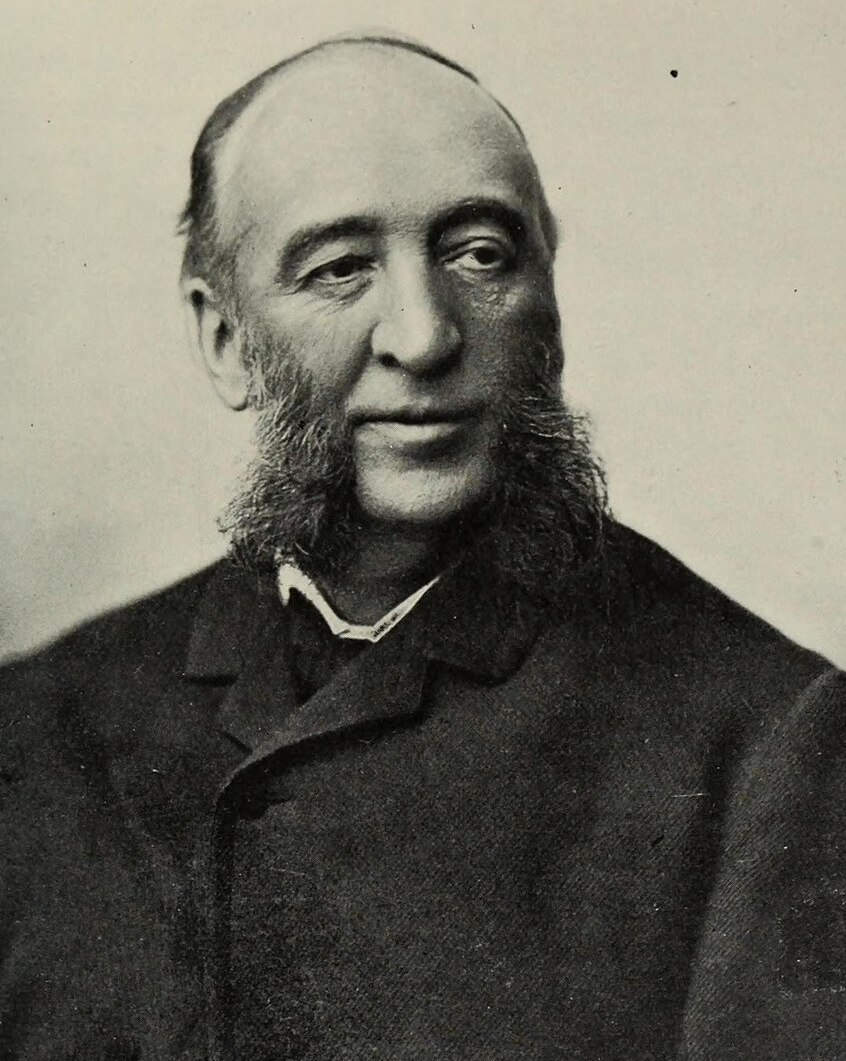

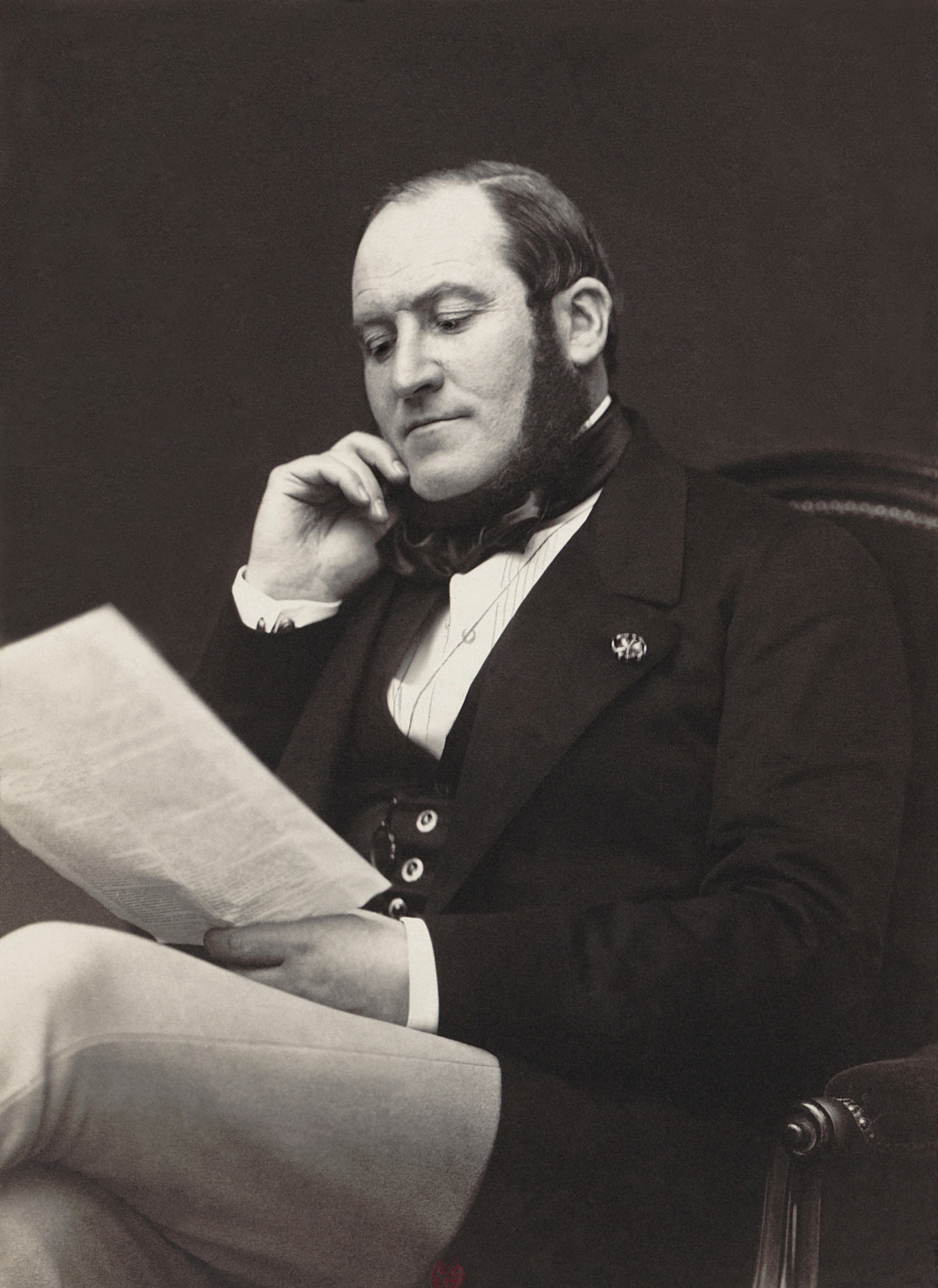

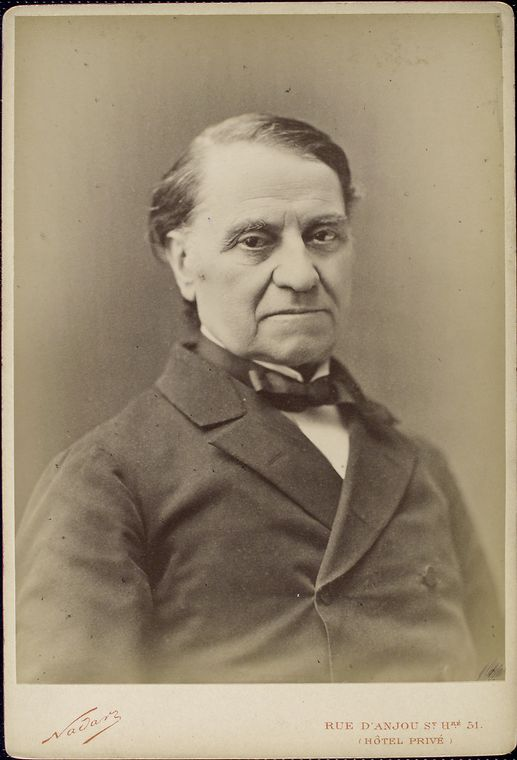
	First party	Second party	Third party
Leader	Léon Gambetta	Jules Ferry	Georges-Eugène Haussmann
Party	Republican Union	Republican Left	Bonapartists
Seats won	204	168	46
	Fourth party	Fifth party	Sixth party
Leader	Louis Blanc
Party	Far-left	Monarchists	Centre-left
Seats won	46	42	39
Prime Minister before election
Jules Ferry
Republican Left
Elected Prime Minister
Léon Gambetta
Republican Union

Legislative elections were held in France on 21 August and 4 September 1881. The elections marked the collapse of the right compared to the 1877 elections.

It was a great success for the followers of Léon Gambetta, whom President Jules Grévy appointed premier two months after the election. His government only lasted 73 days, however, before falling over the issue of electoral reform. This led to three short-lived minority governments, until Jules Ferry was able to form a second government in February 1883 with the support of Gambetta's Republican Union.

== Results ==
Party	Votes	%	Seats
Republican Union			204
Republican Left			168
Bonapartists			46
Far-left			46
Monarchists			42
Centre-left			39
Total			545
Total votes	7,929,503	–	
Registered voters/turnout	10,278,979	77.14	
Source: Rois et Presidents
