= List of indirect presidential elections in France =

French presidential elections prior to popular vote

The president of the French Republic was elected on an indirect basis during the Third Republic and Fourth Republic, as well as at the start of the Fifth Republic.

During the Third Republic and Fourth Republic, the officeholder was elected by a combined vote of the Chamber of Deputies (National Assembly in Fourth Republic) and the Senate (Council in Fourth Republic). At the start of the Fifth Republic in 1958, the first presidential election was held using an electoral college consisting of members of the French Parliament, general councils, as well as overseas assemblies, mayors, deputy mayors and city council members. Since then, the presidency has been directly elected with two round system.

== Third Republic ==
=== 1873 election ===
The 1873 election took place on 24 May following the resignation of incumbent President Adolphe Thiers. At the time of the vote, the Legitimists and Orleanists monarchists held a large majority in Parliament over the Republicans and Bonapartists as a result of the 1871 legislative elections.

Candidate	Party	Round 1	Percentage
Patrice de Mac-Mahon	Legitimists	390	99.74%
Jules Grévy	Republican	1	0.16%

=== 1879 election ===
Candidate	Party	Round 1
Jules Grévy	Republican	84.03%
Antoine Chanzy	Military	14.78%
Léon Gambetta	Republican	0.70%
Paul de Ladmirault	Military	0.14%
Henri d'Orléans, Duke of Aumale	Orleanist	0.14%
Gaston Alexandre Auguste, Marquis de Galliffet	Military	0.14%

=== 1885 election ===
Candidate	Party	Round 1
Jules Grévy	Moderate Republican	79.34%
Henri Brisson	Radical	11.81%
Charles de Freycinet	Moderate Republican	2.43%
Others		6.42%

=== 1887 election ===
Candidate	Party	Round 1	Round 2
Sadi Carnot	Union of the Lefts	35.69%	74.49%
Jules Ferry	Democratic Union	24.97%	withdrew
Félix Gustave Saussier	Military	17.43%	22.73%
Others		22.39%	1.02%

=== 1894 election ===
Candidate	Party	Round 1
Jean Casimir-Perier	Moderate Republican	53.00%
Henri Brisson	Radical	22.91%
Charles Dupuy	Moderate Republican	11.40%
Victor Février	Military	6.23%
Emmanuel Arago	Republican	3.17%
Others		2.59%

=== 1895 election ===
Candidate	Party	Round 1	Round 2
Félix Faure	Moderate Republican	31.00%	53.75%
Henri Brisson	Radical	42.95%	45.13%
Pierre Waldeck-Rousseau	Moderate Republican	23.38%	-
Others		2.67%	1.13%

=== 1899 election ===
Candidate	Party	Round 1
Émile Loubet	Democratic Republican Alliance	58.62%
Jules Méline	Republican Federation	33.86%
Jacques Marie Eugène Godefroy Cavaignac	Nationalist Party	2.79%
Others		3.28%

=== 1906 election ===
Candidate	Party	Round 1
Armand Fallières	Democratic Republican Alliance	52.89%
Paul Doumer	Radical Party	43.70%
Others		3.30%

=== 1913 election ===
Candidate	Party	Round 1	Round 2
Raymond Poincaré	Republican Democratic Party	49.48%	56.23%
Jules Pams	Radical Party	37.72%	34.46%
Édouard Vaillant	Socialist (SFIO)	7.27%	8.03%
Others		5.54%	1.28%

=== January 1920 election ===
Candidate	Party	Preliminary Vote	Round 1
Paul Deschanel	Republican Democratic Party	49.63%	82.66%
Georges Clemenceau	Independent Radicals	47.32%	5.97%
Charles Jonnart	Republican Democratic Party	0.36%	7.21%
Others		3.66%	1.51%

=== September 1920 election ===
Candidate	Party	Round 1
Alexandre Millerand	Independent Centre-Right	88.92%
Gustave Delory	Socialist (SFIO)	8.78%
Others		2.80%

=== 1924 election ===
Candidate	Party	Round 1
Gaston Doumergue	Radical Party	59.88%
Paul Painlevé	Republican-Socialist Party	35.93%
Zéphyrin Camélinat	Communist Party	2.44%
Others		0.87%

=== 1931 election ===
Candidate	Party	Round 1	Round 2
Paul Doumer	Independent	49.06%	56.44%
Pierre Marraud	Left	-	37.40%
Paul Painlevé	Republican-Socialist Party	-	1.46%
Aristide Briand	Socialist (SFIO)	44.51%	1.34%
Marcel Cachin	Communist	1.11%	1.23%
Jean Hennessy	Republican Federation	1.66%	-
Others		3.22%	1.01%

=== 1932 election ===
Candidate	Party	Round 1
Albert Lebrun	Democratic Alliance	81.47%
Paul Faure	Socialist (SFIO)	14.67%
Paul Painlevé	Republican-Socialist Party	1.54%
Marcel Cachin	Communist	1.03%
Others		1.29%

=== 1939 election ===
Candidate	Party	Round 1
Albert Lebrun	Democratic Alliance	55.60%
Albert Bedouce	Socialist (SFIO)	16.59%
Marcel Cachin	Communist	8.13%
Édouard Herriot	Radical Party	5.82%
Justin Godart	Democratic Left	5.49%
Fernand Bouisson	Republican-Socialist Party	1.76%
François Piétri	Republican Federation	1.76%
Others		4.84%

== Fourth Republic ==
=== 1947 election ===
Candidate	Party	Votes	%
Vincent Auriol	SFIO	452	51.19%
Auguste Champetier de Ribes	MRP	242	27.41%
Jules Gasser	RAD	122	13.82%
Michel Clemenceau	PRL	60	6.80%

=== 1953 election ===
The elections in December 1953 required thirteen rounds of voting before a candidate reached a majority of the vote. The election was eventually won by René Coty of the National Centre of Independents and Peasants (CNIP), who had only entered in the eleventh round.

Candidate	Party	First		Second		Third		Fourth		Fifth		Sixth		Seventh		Eighth		Ninth		Tenth		Eleventh		Twelfth		Thirteenth	
Candidate	Party	Votes	%	Votes	%	Votes	%	Votes	%	Votes	%	Votes	%	Votes	%	Votes	%	Votes	%	Votes	%	Votes	%	Votes	%	Votes	%
René Coty	CNIP	–	–	–	–	–	–	–	–	–	–	–	–	–	–	–	–	–	–	–	–	71	8.07	431	48.87	477	54.76
Marcel-Edmond Naegelen	SFIO	160	17.24	299	32.57	313	33.95	344	37.47	312	33.88	306	33.81	303	33.33	381	41.91	365	40.15	358	41.29	372	42.27	333	37.76	329	37.77
Louis Jacquinot	CNIP	–	–	–	–	–	–	–	–	–	–	–	–	–	–	14	1.54	–	–	–	–	338	38.4	26	2.95	21	2.41
Joseph Laniel	CNIP	155	16.70	276	30.07	358	38.83	408	44.44	374	40.61	397	43.87	407	44.47	430	47.30	413	45.43	392	45.21	–	–	–	–	–	–
Pierre Montel	CNIP	–	–	–	–	–	–	–	–	–	–	–	–	–	–	–	–	103	11.33	84	9.69	–	–	–	–	–	–
Antoine Pinay	CNIP	–	–	–	–	–	–	–	–	–	–	–	–	–	–	–	–	25	2.75	–	–	–	–	–	–	–	–
Jean Medecin	RAD	54	5.52	–	–	–	–	45	4.90	197	22.31	171	18.90	156	17.16	–	–	–	–	–	–	–	–	–	–	–	–
Yvon Delbos	RAD	129	13.90	180	19.60	225	24.40	42	4.58	–	–	–	–	–	–	–	–	–	–	–	–	–	–	–	–	–	–
André Cornu	RAD	–	–	–	–	–	–	35	3.81	–	–	–	–	–	–	–	–	–	–	–	–	–	–	–	–	–	–
Georges Bidault	MRP	131	14.12	143	15.58	–	–	–	–	–	–	–	–	–	–	–	–	–	–	–	–	–	–	–	–	–	–
Paul-Jacques Kalb	RPF	114	12.28	–	–	–	–	–	–	–	–	–	–	–	–	–	–	–	–	–	–	–	–	–	–	–	–
Marcel Cachin	PCF	113	12.18	–	–	–	–	–	–	–	–	–	–	–	–	–	–	–	–	–	–	–	–	–	–	–	–
Jacques Fourcade	CNIP	62	6.68	–	–	–	–	–	–	–	–	–	–	–	–	–	–	–	–	–	–	–	–	–	–	–	–
Others		10	1.08	20	2.18	26	2.82	44	4.79	38	4.13	31	3.43	43	4.73	53	5.83	28	3.08	33	3.81	99	11.25	92	10.43	44	5.05
Total		928		918		922		918		921		905		909		878		934		867		880		882		871	

== Fifth Republic ==
=== 1958 election ===
The 1958 election was the first of the French Fifth Republic and took place on 21 December. It was the only French presidential election by the electoral college (gathering the members of the French Parliament, the Conseils Généraux, the overseas assemblies, and tens of thousands of mayors, deputy mayors and city council members). To win, a candidate was required to receive 50% of the vote. This system was used only for this election, and was changed in the 1962 referendum in time for the 1965 presidential election.

Summary of the 21 December 1958 French presidential election result
Candidates	Parties	1st round	
Candidates	Parties	Votes	%
Charles de Gaulle	UNR	62,394	78.51%
Georges Marrane	PCF	10,355	13.03%
Albert Châtelet	DVG	6,721	8.46%
Total		79,470	100%
Valid votes		79,470	97.76%
Spoilt and null votes		1,820	2.24%
Turnout		81,290	99.42%
Abstentions		474	0.58%
Registered voters		81,764	
Official results by Constitutional Council of France. Source: List of candidates · First round result
