= Louis Marchegay =

French politician (1869–1933)

Louis Marchegay (5 October 1869 Rochefort – 15 September 1933, Saint-Germain-de-Prinçay), was a French politician.

== Biography ==
He gained a degree in law at Sciences Po, and he was elected as a deputy for Vendée in 1895 after the death of Aristide Batiot. He lost the next election and he was replaced by Zénobe Alexis de Lespinay.

As he had lands, he was elected as the President of the Portland Artificial Cement of Indochina.
