= Parnay, Maine-et-Loire =

Parnay
- Commune
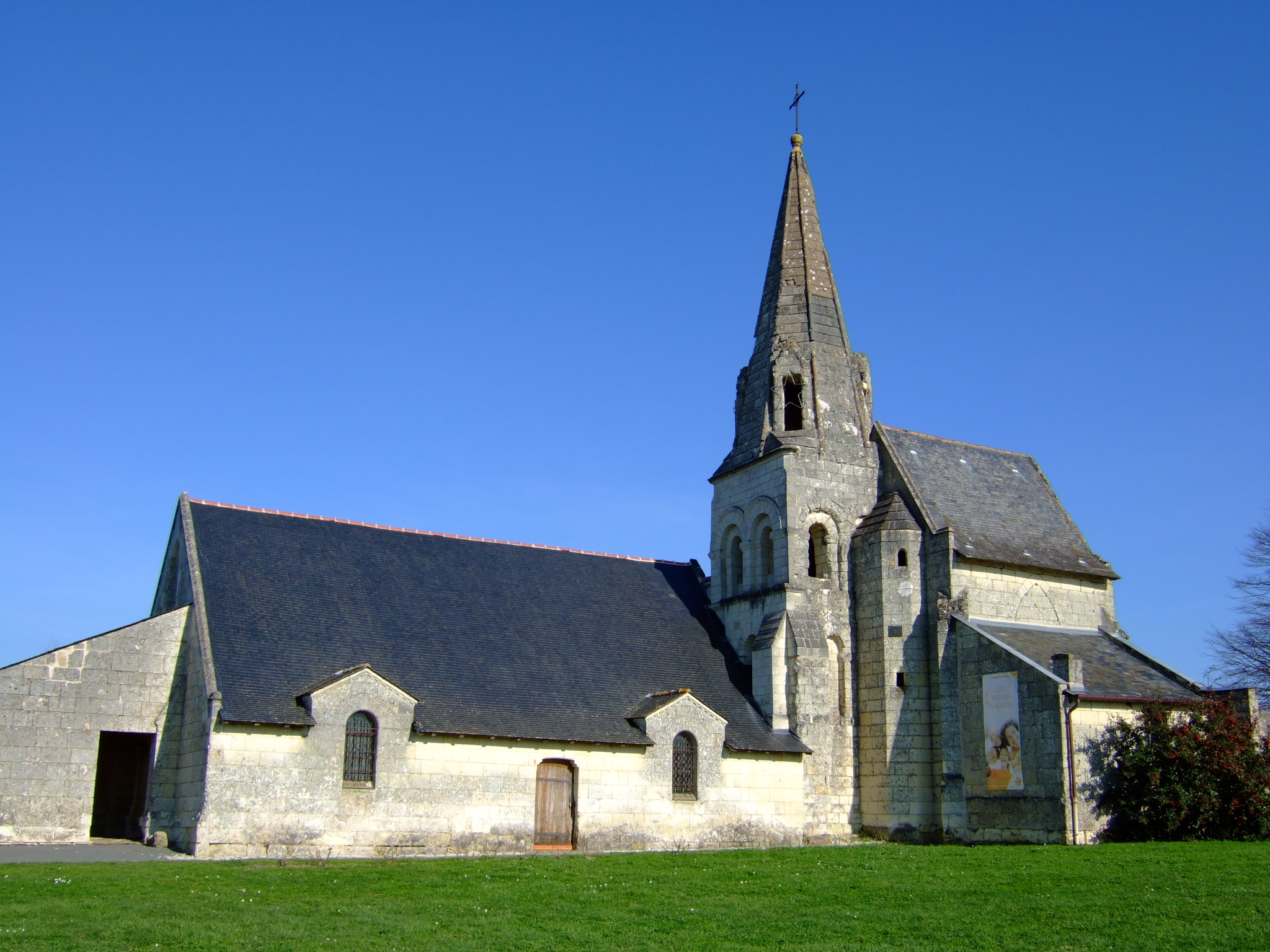
- St Peter’s Church in Parnay
- Location of Parnay
- Location within France Location within Pays de la Loire
- Coordinates: 47°13′55″N 0°00′33″E
- Country: France
- Region: Pays de la Loire
- Department: Maine-et-Loire
- Arrondissement: Saumur
- Canton: Saumur
- Intercommunality: CA Saumur Val de Loire

Government
  - Mayor (2020–2026): Éric Lefièvre
- Area^{1}: 6.54 km^{2} (2.53 sq mi)
- Elevation: 32 m (105 ft)
- Highest elevation: 101 m (331 ft)
- Lowest elevation: 26 m (85 ft)
- Population (2023): 373
  - Density: 57.0/km^{2} (148/sq mi)
- Demonym(s): Parnaisien, Parnaisienne
- Time zone: UTC+01:00 (CET)
  - Summer (DST): UTC+02:00 (CEST)
- INSEE/Postal code: 49235 /49730
- Website: www.parnay.fr
- ^{1} French Land Register data, which excludes lakes, ponds, glaciers > 1 km^{2} (0.386 sq mi or 247 acres) and river estuaries.

Parnay (French pronunciation: [paʁnɛ]) is a commune in the Maine-et-Loire department in western France. It is known for its 11th-Century church. Parnay is one of the nine communes that is in the AOC Saumur-Champigny and fruit Red Wine made from Cabernet Franc.

The Greenwich Prime Meridian passes through Parnay, as does its satellite-calculated successor, the IERS Reference Meridian, which runs about 100 metres to the east of it.

Another way of putting this is to say that Parnay lies due south of the Royal Observatory, Greenwich, in England.

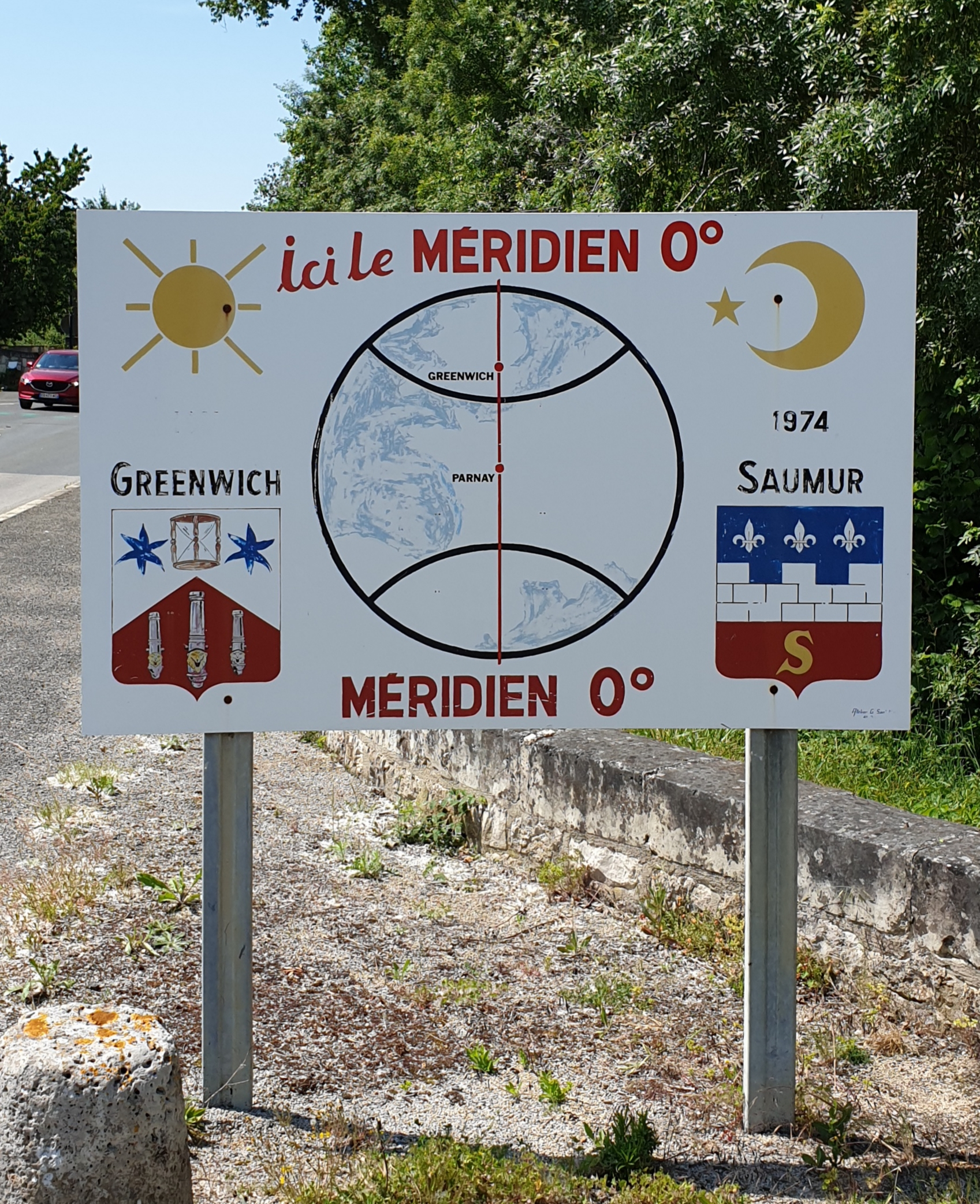
The prime meridian sign in Parnay, Maine-et-Loire, France

== See also ==
- Communes of the Maine-et-Loire department
