= 1893 French legislative election =

- 20 August and 3 September 1893

All 566 seats in the Chamber of Deputies 284 seats needed for a majority
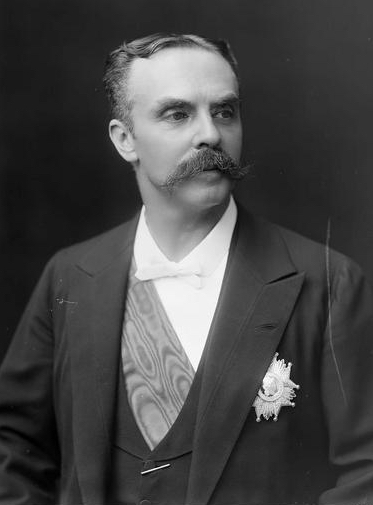

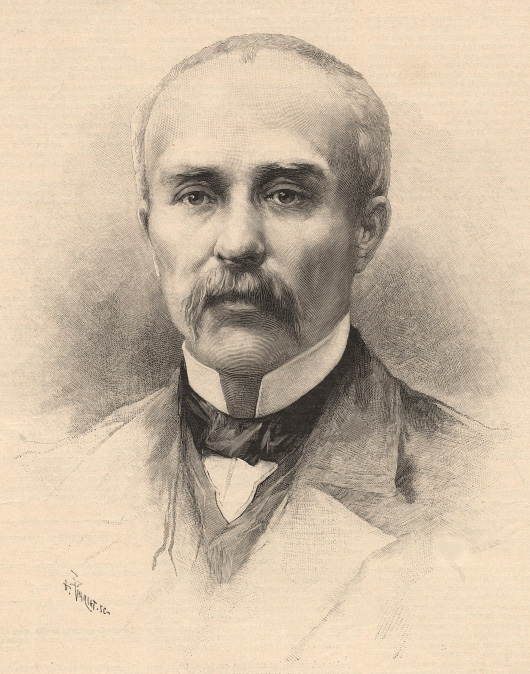

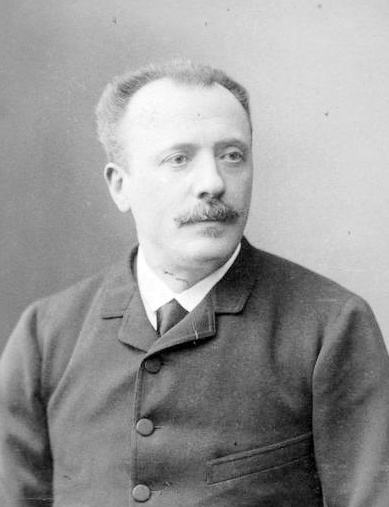
| | First party | Second party | Third party |
|---|---|---|---|
| Leader | Jean Casimir-Perier | Georges Clemenceau | Albert de Mun |
| Party | Moderate Republicans | Radicals | Conservatives |
| Seats won | 279 | 143 | 76 |
| Popular vote | 3,187,670 | 1,443,915 | 1,178,007 |
| Percentage | 44.60% | 20.20% | 16.48% |
Prime Minister before election
Charles Dupuy
Democratic Union
Elected Prime Minister
Jean Casimir-Perier
Democratic Union

Legislative elections were held in France on 20 August and 3 September 1893. The Republicans were victorious and gained an increased majority, which resulted in President Sadi Carnot inviting Jean Casimir-Perier to form a government. However, there was increasing tension between the Radicals and the Moderates in the ruling coalition, which had manifested itself in the passage of a protectionist tariff law with right-wing support in January 1892.

After the elections, following the bombing of the Chamber of Deputies by the anarchist Auguste Vaillant on 9 December 1893, Casimir-Perier rushed through the lois scélérates with the support of the Right.

Casimir-Perier was elected to the presidency on 24 June 1894, following the assassination of President Carnot by the Italian anarchist Sante Geronimo Caserio. In January 1895, however, he resigned, and was replaced by Félix Faure, again with the support of the Right.

Casimir-Perier's government was followed by a series of moderate governments with right-wing support under Charles Dupuy, Alexandre Ribot and Jules Méline – with the short-lived exception of the government of Radical Léon Bourgeois (November 1895 – April 1896).

== Results ==
| Party | Votes | % | Seats |
|---|---|---|---|
| Moderate Republicans | 3,187,670 | 44.60 | 279 |
| Radicals | 1,443,915 | 20.20 | 143 |
| Conservatives | 1,178,007 | 16.48 | 76 |
| Socialists | 598,206 | 8.37 | 31 |
| Republicans | 458,416 | 6.41 | 27 |
| Radical-Socialists | 171,810 | 2.40 | 10 |
| Others | 108,596 | 1.52 | 0 |
| Total | 7,146,620 | 100.00 | 566 |
| Valid votes | 7,146,620 | 97.56 | |
| Invalid/blank votes | 178,734 | 2.44 | |
| Total votes | 7,325,354 | 100.00 | |
| Registered voters/turnout | 10,443,378 | 70.14 | |
Source: Nohlen & Stöver
