= Charles Ferry =

French politician (1834–1909)

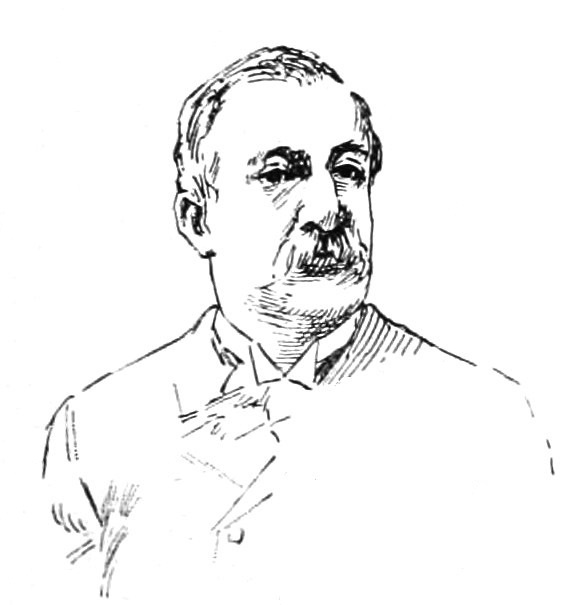
A drawing of Charles Émile's portrait

Charles Émile Joseph Léon Ferry (23 May 1834 – 21 July 1909) was a French politician.

The younger brother of Jules Ferry, Charles Ferry was born in Saint-Dié, in the département of Vosges. Charles was a businessman, becoming involved in national politics during the Franco-Prussian War when he served in Paris as aide to Jules Favre, Vice-President of the Government of National Defence.

After the war, Ferry was appointed prefect of Saône-et-Loire, then served as government commissioner in Corsica in October and November 1871, and prefect of Haute-Garonne after that until May 1873. Leaving government service, Ferry returned to business and banking.

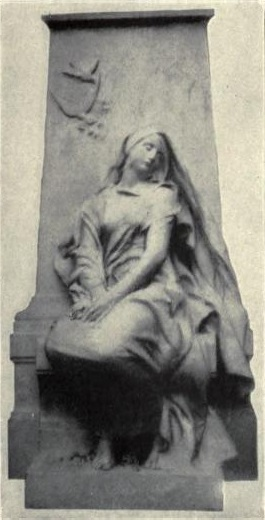
Le Souvenir (1885) by Antonin Mercié; placed on the tomb of C. Ferry.

In 1881, he was elected to the Chamber of Deputies to represent Épinal. He joined his brother in the ranks of the Opportunist Republicans. He served only a single term, not standing for reelection in 1885. He was elected to the Senate in 1888, representing the Vosges department, being replaced by his brother in 1891.

Ferry was returned to the Chamber of Deputies in 1893, representing Saint-Dié. He was re-elected in 1898 but was defeated in 1902 by Edmond Gérard

Ferry then left politics and died in Paris.

His son Abel was also a politician.
