= 1885 French legislative election =

- 4–18 October 1885

All 584 seats in the Chamber of Deputies 293 seats needed for a majority
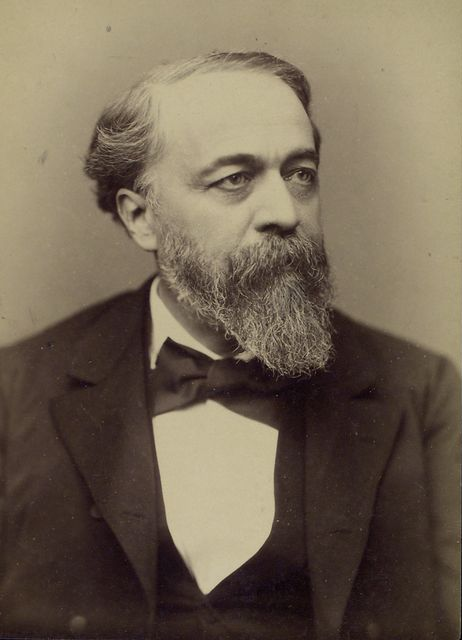

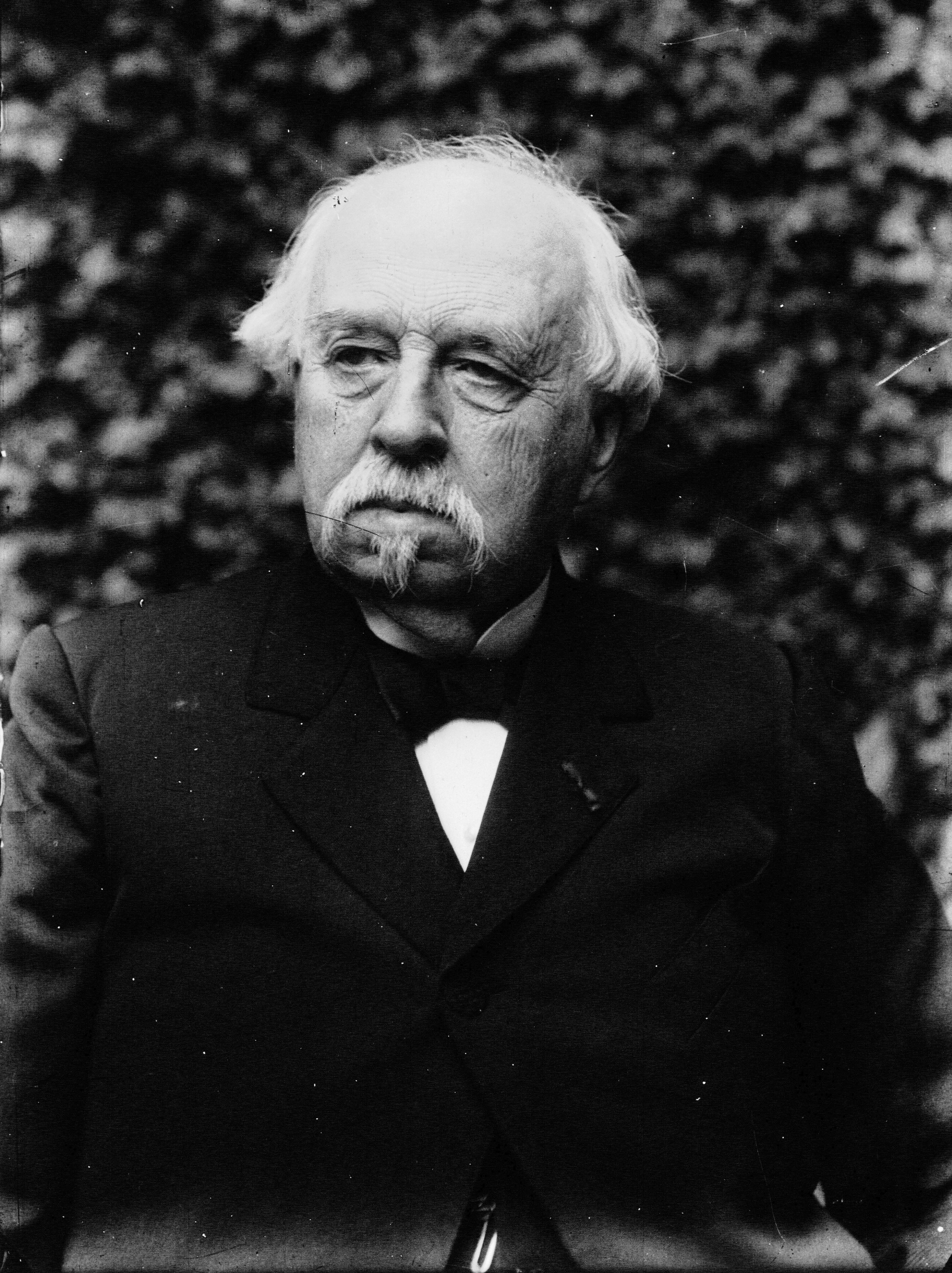
	First party	Second party	Third party
Leader	Henri Brisson		Armand de Mackau
Party	Opportunist Republicans	Moderates	Monarchists
Seats won	200	83	73
Prime Minister before election
Henri Brisson
Republican Union
Elected Prime Minister
Henri Brisson
Opportunist Republicans

Legislative elections were held in France on 4 and 18 October 1885. Following the deaths of Louis-Napoléon, Prince Imperial and the Comte de Chambord, the monarchists and Bonapartists formed a conservative electoral alliance under the leadership of Baron Armand de Mackau. In the first round of the election, the conservatives won 176 seats, whereas the Opportunist Republicans – partly because radical and moderate Republicans ran against each other, underestimating the danger from the right - only won 127. However, in the second round the radical and moderate Republicans agreed that the worse-placed Republican candidates would withdraw, and Republicans won 244 seats to the conservatives' 25, leading to a Republican victory.

Henri Brisson remained prime minister immediately after the elections, but resigned in December following his defeat in the presidential election to the incumbent, Jules Grévy. Brisson was replaced by Charles de Freycinet.

== Results ==
Party	Votes	%	Seats
Opportunist Republicans			200
Moderates			83
Monarchists			73
Bonapartists			65
Conservatives			63
Radical Socialists			60
Independent Radicals			40
Total			584
Total votes	7,929,503	–	
Registered voters/turnout	10,278,979	77.14	
Source: Rois et Presidents
