= 1877 French legislative election =

- 14–28 October 1877

All 521 seats in the Chamber of Deputies 261 seats needed for a majority
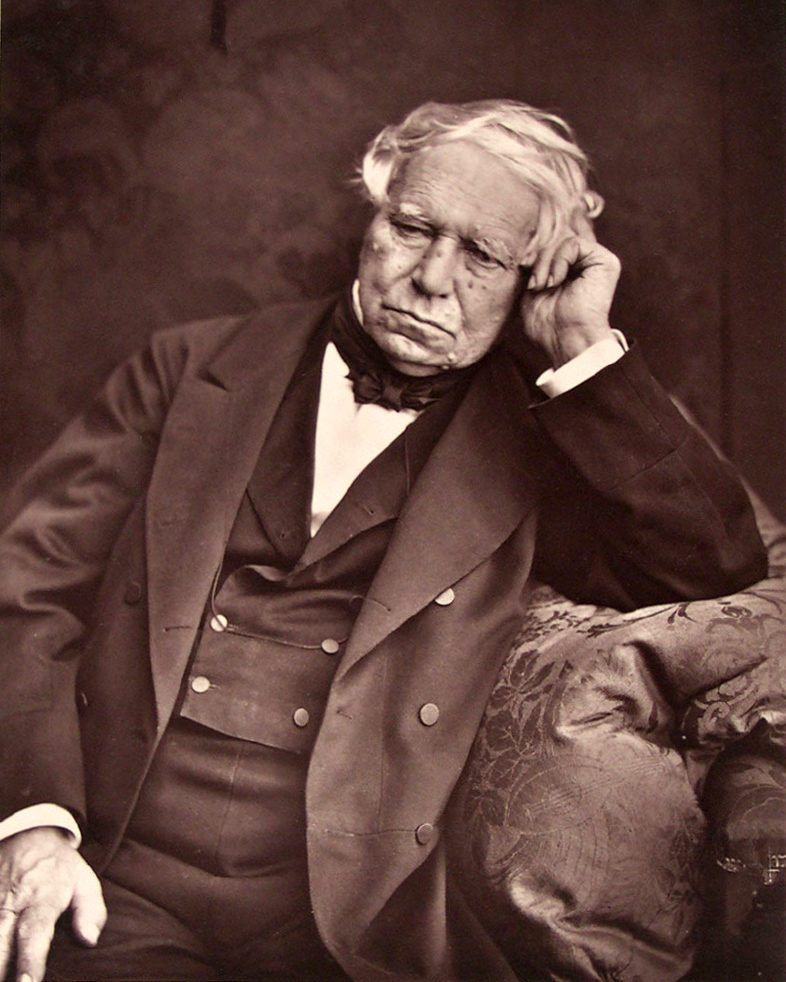

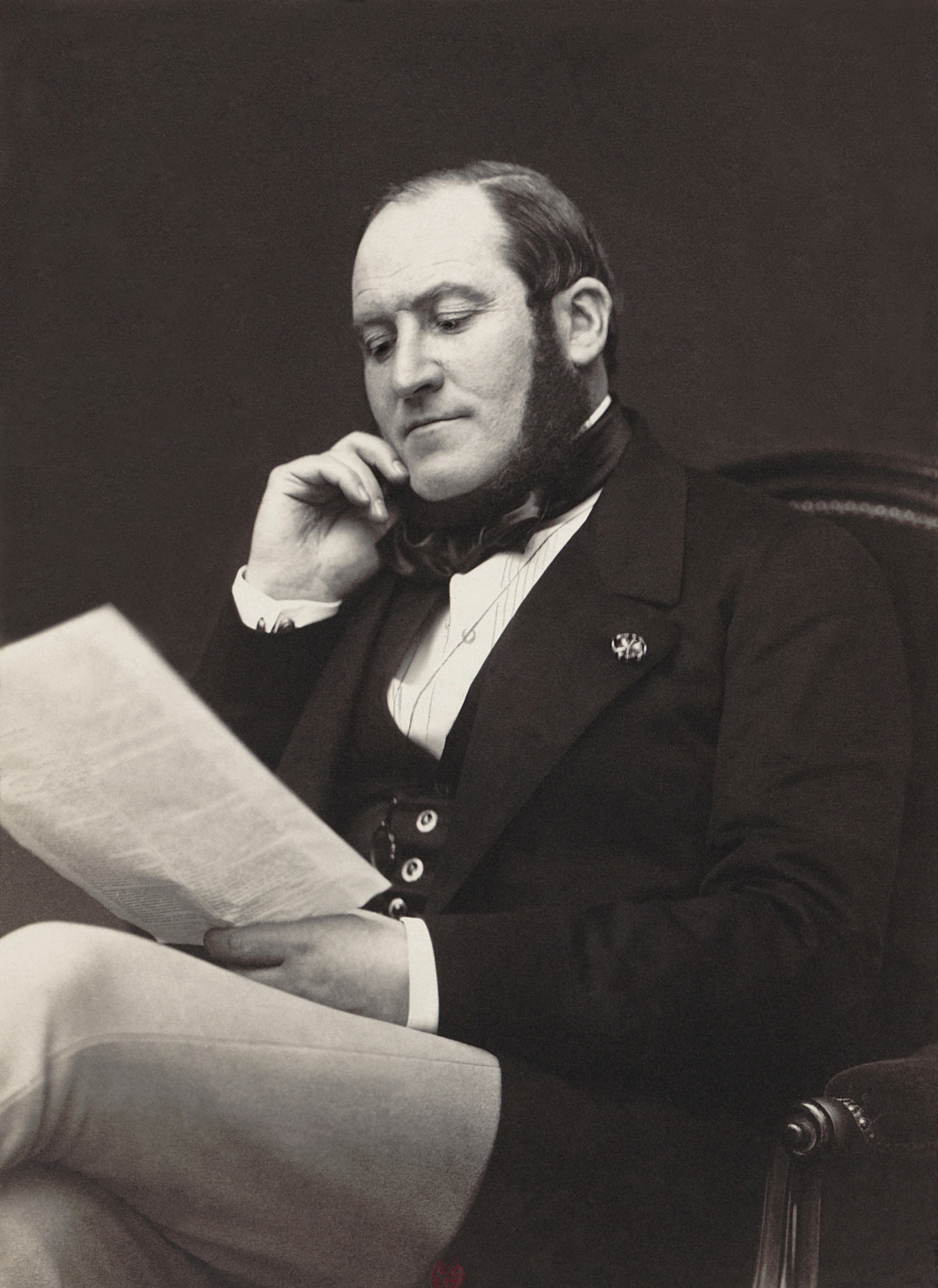

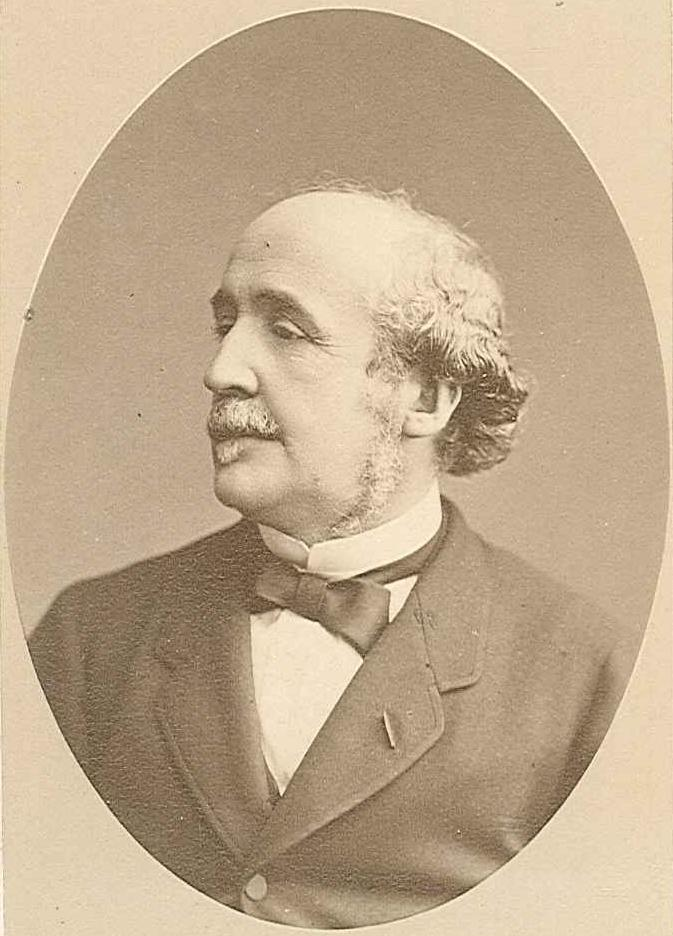
	First party	Second party
Leader	Jules Dufaure	Georges-Eugène Haussmann
Party	Republican Union	Bonapartists
Seats won	313	104
	Third party	Fourth party
Leader	Albert de Broglie
Party	Legitimists	Orléanist
Seats won	44	11
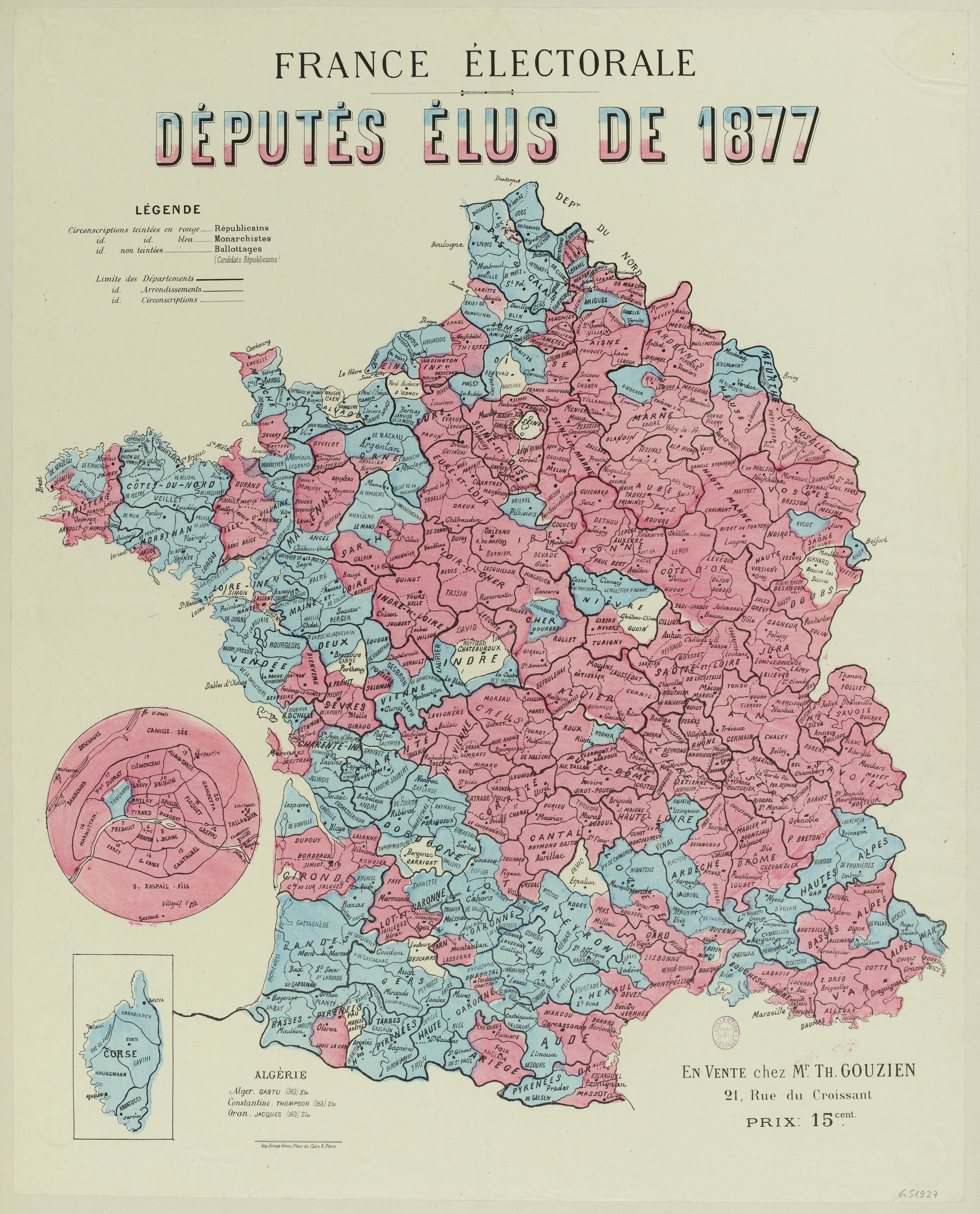
- Results by district (republicans in red, monarchists in blue)
Prime Minister before election
Gaëtan de Rochebouët
Independent
Elected Prime Minister
Jules Dufaure
Republican Left

Legislative elections were held in France on 14 and 28 October 1877 to elect members of the Chamber of Deputies. They were held during the Seize Mai crisis.

President Patrice de MacMahon dissolved the Chamber of Deputies elected in 1876, in the hope of a conservative and royalist victory. Although royalists lost seats, Bonapartists increased their seat total over 1876; the Republicans lost 80 seats, but retained a majority.

The elections proved a serious setback for those hoping for a restoration of the monarchy, such as MacMahon. In the Senate elections of January 1879, the monarchists also lost control of the Senate. MacMahon resigned, and the Republican Jules Grévy was elected president by the National Assembly.

Along with the 1997 election and 2024 election, it is a rare case of an election in which the sitting President's party lost a general election which he had called.

== Results ==
Party	Votes	%	Seats
Republican Union			313
Bonapartists			104
Legitimists			44
Orléanist			11
Others			49
Total			521
Total votes	8,087,323	–	
Registered voters/turnout	9,948,449	81.29	
Source: Rois et Presidents

== See also ==
- 1877 French legislative election in Algeria
- Purge of the French Civil Service (1879-1884)
