= 1889 French legislative election =

- 22 September and 6 October 1889

All 576 seats in the Chamber of Deputies 289 seats needed for a majority
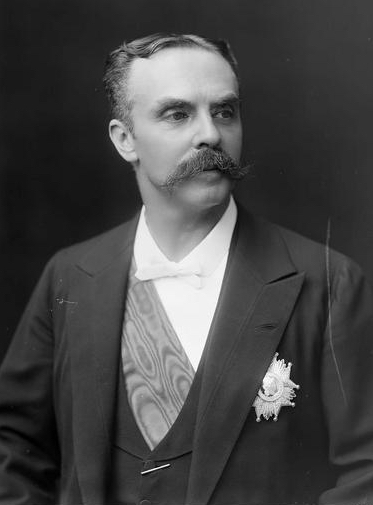

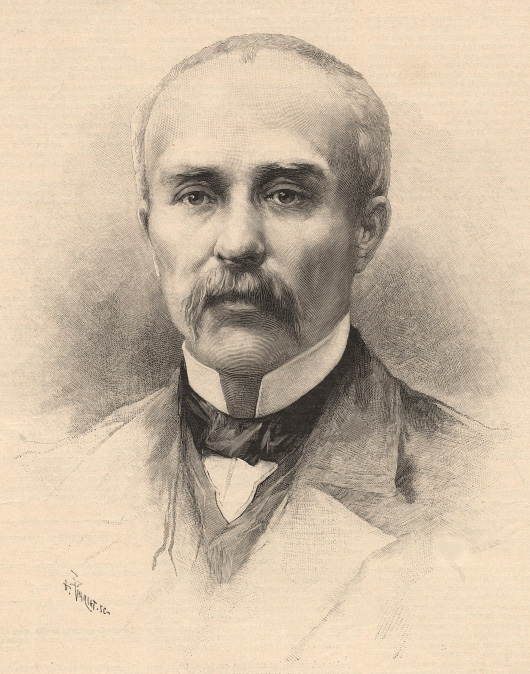

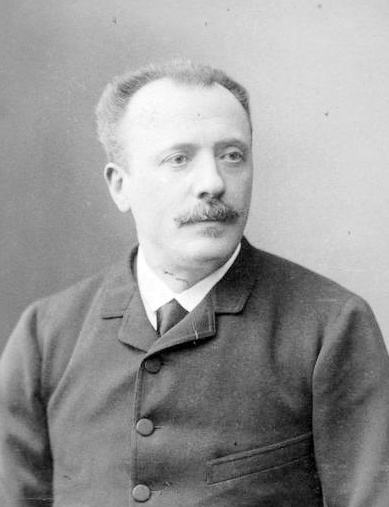

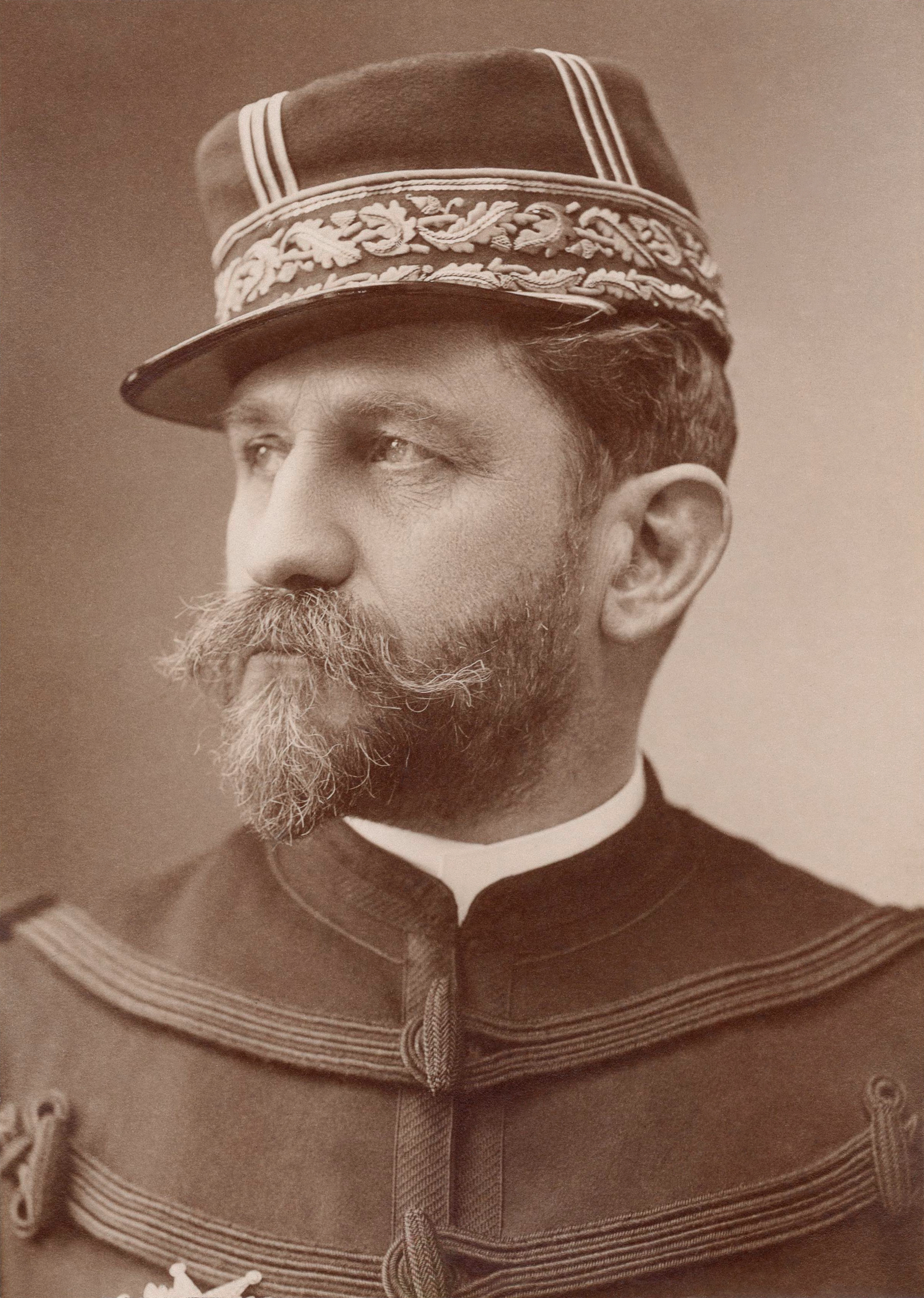
	First party	Second party
Leader	Jean Casimir-Perier	Georges Clemenceau
Party	Moderate Republicans	Independent Radicals
Seats won	216	100
	Third party	Fourth party
Leader	Albert de Mun	Georges Boulanger
Party	Monarchists	Boulangists
Seats won	86	72
Prime Minister before election
Pierre Tirard
Independent
Elected Prime Minister
Pierre Tirard
Independent

Legislative elections were held in France on 22 September and 6 October 1889 during the Boulanger affair. They resulted in a victory for the Republicans, and a thorough defeat for the Boulangists.

== Results ==
=== Votes ===
Party	Votes	%
Republicans	4,177,464	52.37
Conservatives	2,914,985	36.54
Boulangists	709,223	8.89
Socialists	175,775	2.20
Total	7,977,447	100.00
Source: France-Politique

=== Seats ===
Party	Seats
Moderate Republicans	216
Independent Radicals	100
Monarchists	86
Boulangists	72
Bonapartists	52
Centre-left	38
Socialists	12
Total	576
Source: Rois et Presidents

== See also ==
- 1889 French legislative election in Algeria
