= Outline of France =

Country in Western Europe with overseas territories

The Flag of France

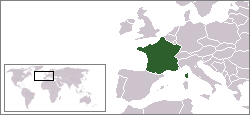
The location of Metropolitan France

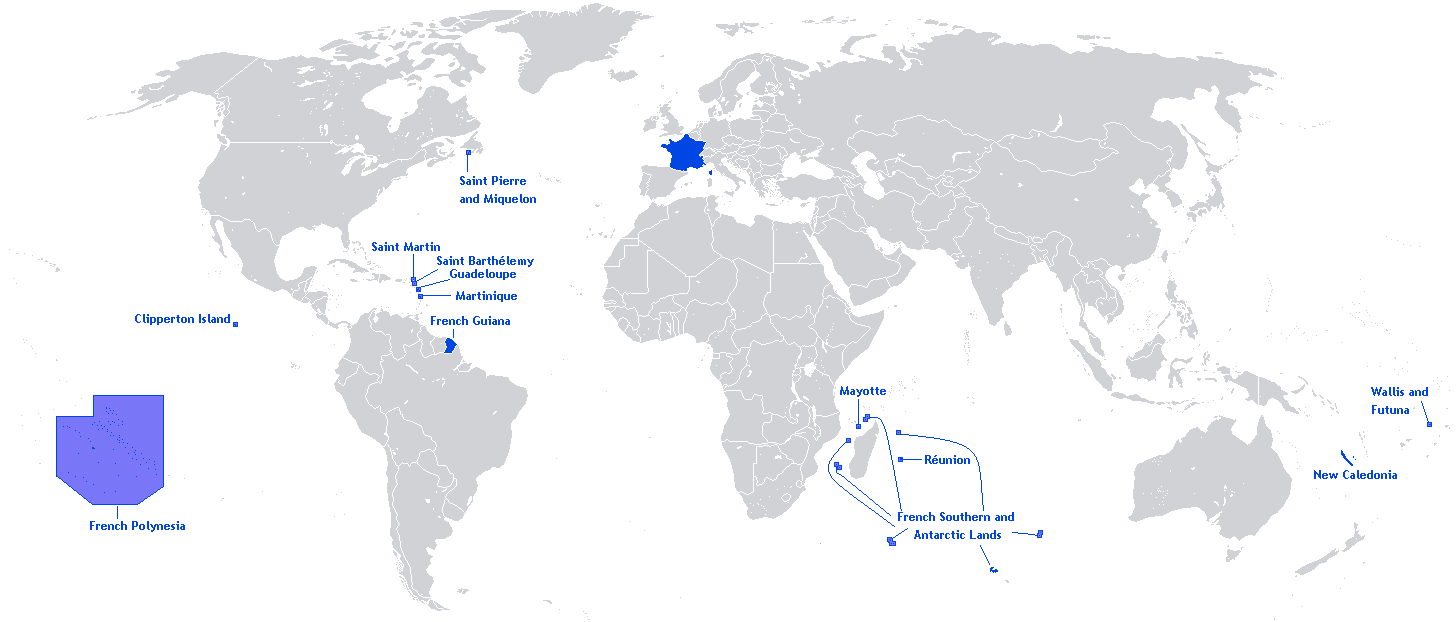
The territory of the French Republic

An enlargeable map of Metropolitan France

The following outline is provided as an overview and topical guide of France:

France – country in Western Europe with several overseas regions and territories. Metropolitan France extends from the Mediterranean Sea to the English Channel and the North Sea, and from the Rhine to the Atlantic Ocean. From its shape, it is often referred to in French as l’Hexagone ("The Hexagon").

== General reference ==
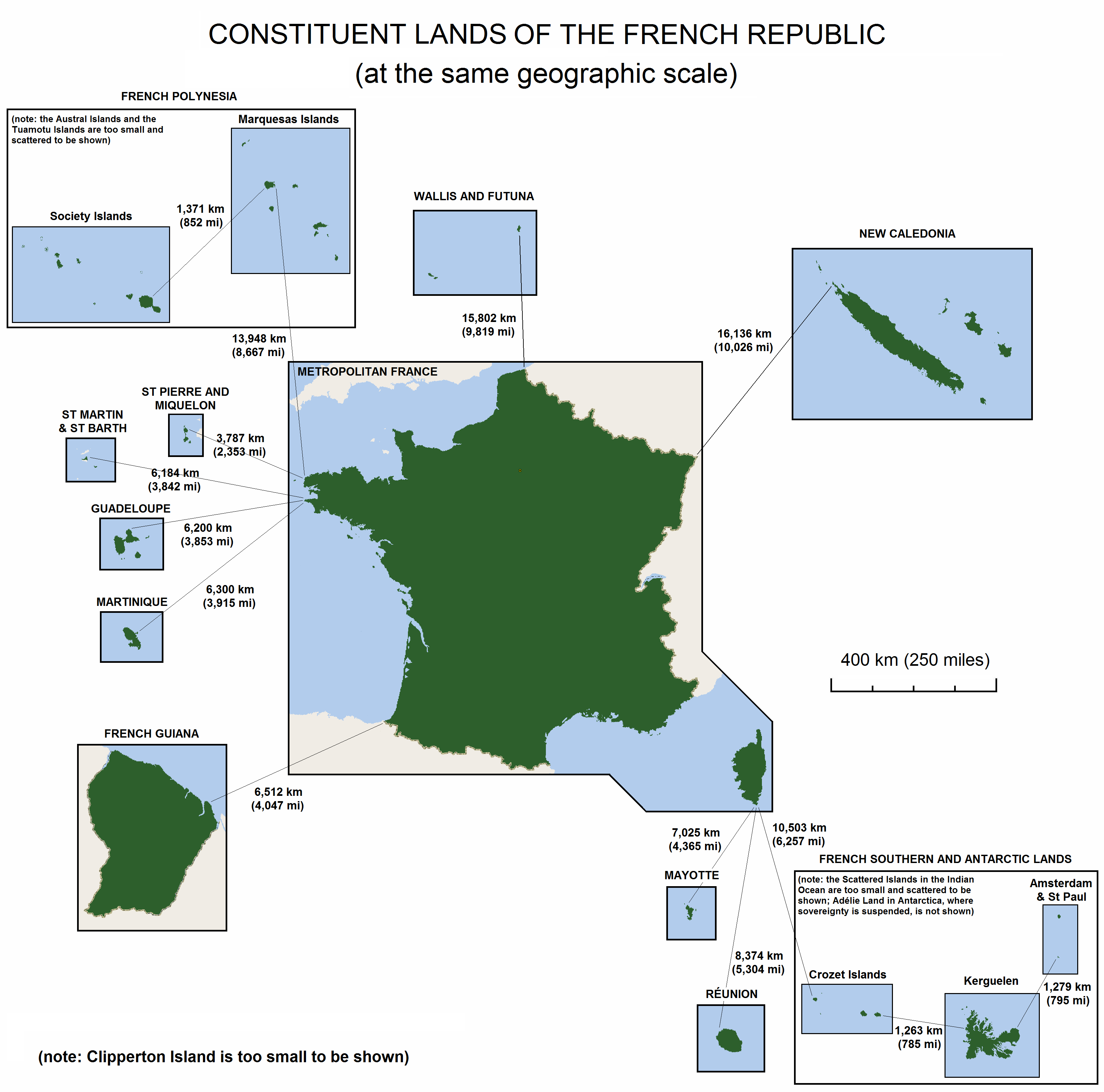
Constituent lands of the French Republic

- Pronunciation: English: /ˈfræns/ or /ˈfrɑːns/, French: [fʁɑ̃s]; (the French Republic: French: République française, pronounced [ʁepyblik fʁɑ̃sɛːz])
- Common English country name: France
- Official English country name: The French Republic
- Common endonym(s): La France
- Official endonym(s): République française
- Adjectival(s): French (can refer to people, language or anything related to the country)
- Demonym(s): French (or Frenchman/Frenchwoman)
- Etymology: Name of France
- International rankings of France
- ISO country codes: FR, FRA, 250
- ISO region codes: See ISO 3166-2:FR
- Internet country code top-level domain: .fr

== Geography of France ==
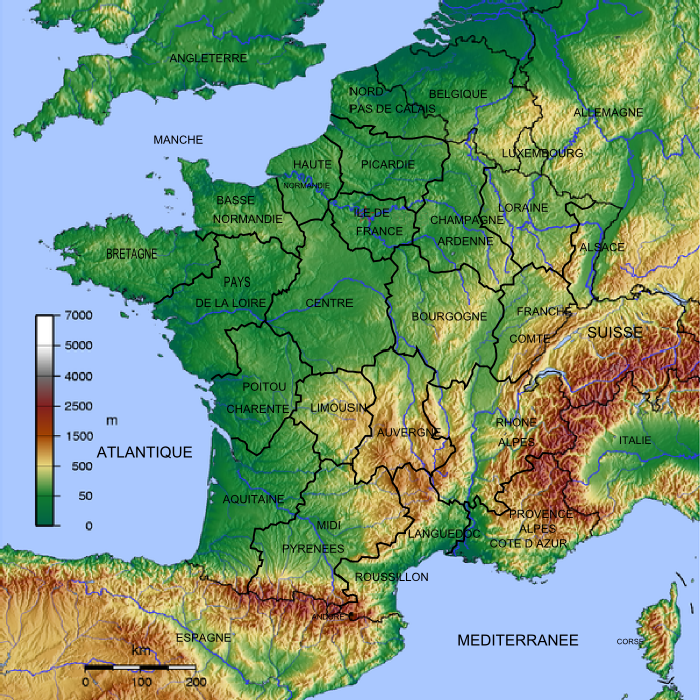
An enlargeable topographic map of Metropolitan France

- France is a:
  - Country
    - Developed country
  - Sovereign state
    - Member State of the European Union
    - Member state of NATO
- Location:
  - Northern Hemisphere, on the Prime Meridian
    - Eurasia
      - Europe
        - mostly in Western Europe (Note: French Guiana is located in South America; Guadeloupe and Martinique are in the Caribbean; and Réunion and Mayotte are in the Indian Ocean, off the coast of Africa. All five are considered integral parts of the republic.)
  - Time in France
    - Time zones:
      - Metropolitan France – Central European Time (UTC+01), Central European Summer Time (UTC+02)
  - Extreme points of France (major towns)
    - North: Dunkirk at the North Sea
    - South: Perpignan, at the Spanish border
    - East: Haguenau, at the German border
    - West: Brest, south of Land's End (England)
    - High: Mont Blanc 4,810 m (15,781 ft) – highest point of Western Europe
    - Low: Les Moëres −2.5 m (−8 ft)
  - Land boundaries: 4,072 km (2,530 mi)
    - Metropolitan France: 2,889 km (1,795 mi)

Spain 623 km (387 mi)
Belgium 620 km (385 mi)
Switzerland 573 km (356 mi)
Italy 488 km (303 mi)
Germany 451 km (280 mi)
Luxembourg 73 km (45 mi)
Andorra 57 km (35 mi)
Monaco 4 km (2 mi)

- French Guiana: 1,183 km (735 mi)

Brazil 673 km (418 mi)
Suriname 510 km (317 mi)

- Coastline: 4,668 km (2,901 mi)

- Metropolitan France: 3,427 km (2,129 mi)
- Incorporated overseas territories: 1,241 km (771 mi)

- Population of France: 68,035,000 people (2021 estimate) – 20th most populous country
- Area of France: 674,843 km^{2} (260,558 sq mi) – 40th largest country
- Atlas of France
- Communes (municipalities) of France

=== Environment of France ===
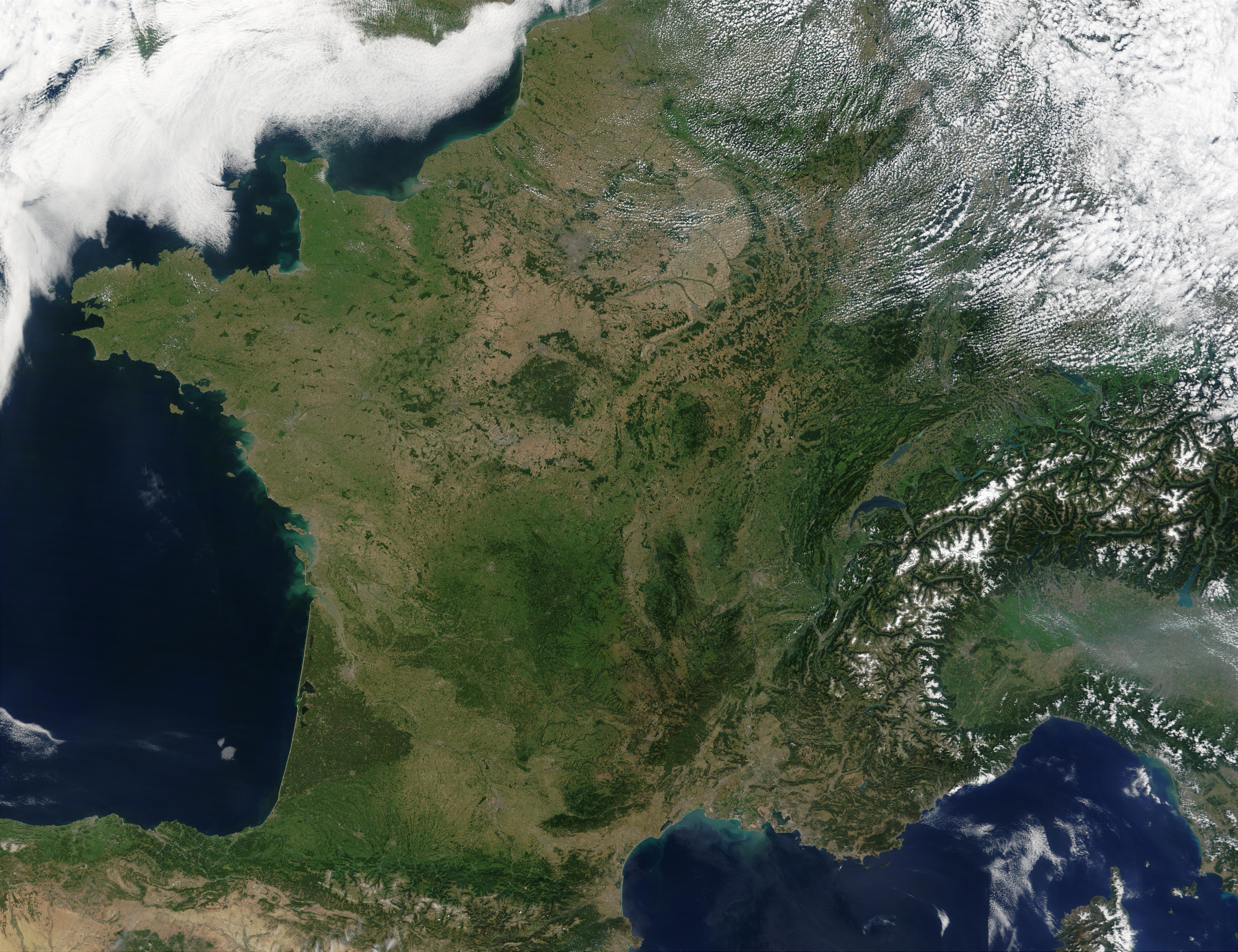
An enlargeable satellite image of Metropolitan France

- Climate of France
- Ecology of France
  - Renewable energy in France
- Geology of France
- National parks of France
- Wildlife of France
  - Flora of France
    - Flora of the Alps
  - Fauna of France
    - Birds of France
    - Mammals of France
    - Non-marine molluscs of France

==== Geographic features of France ====
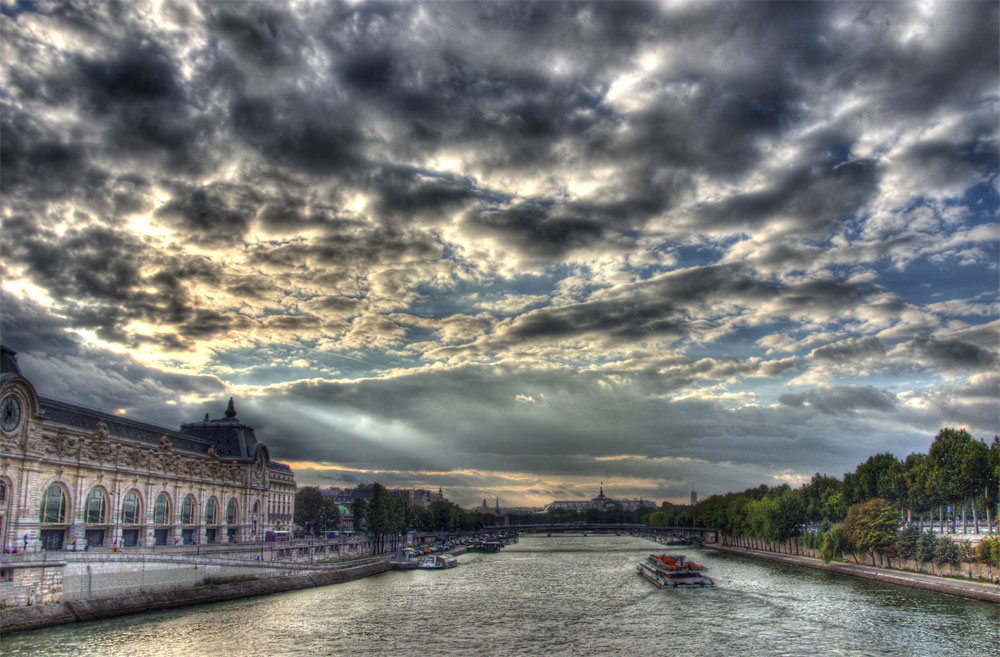
The Seine as seen from the Pont Royal

- Glaciers of France
- Islands of France
- Lakes of France
- Mountains of France
  - French Alps
  - Volcanoes in France
- Rivers of France
- List of World Heritage Sites in France (See also List of World Heritage Sites in Western Europe for transboundary sites)

=== Regions of France ===
"Region" is also the name of France's main type of political division

- Metropolitan France (in Western Europe)
- Overseas departments and territories of France

==== Administrative divisions of France ====
- Regions of France
  - Departments of France
    - Municipalities of France ("Communes")

===== Regions of France (Administrative) =====
Regions of France Since January 1, 2016, continental France is divided into 13 administrative Regions instead of the former 22 regions. The 5 overseas regions are untouched:

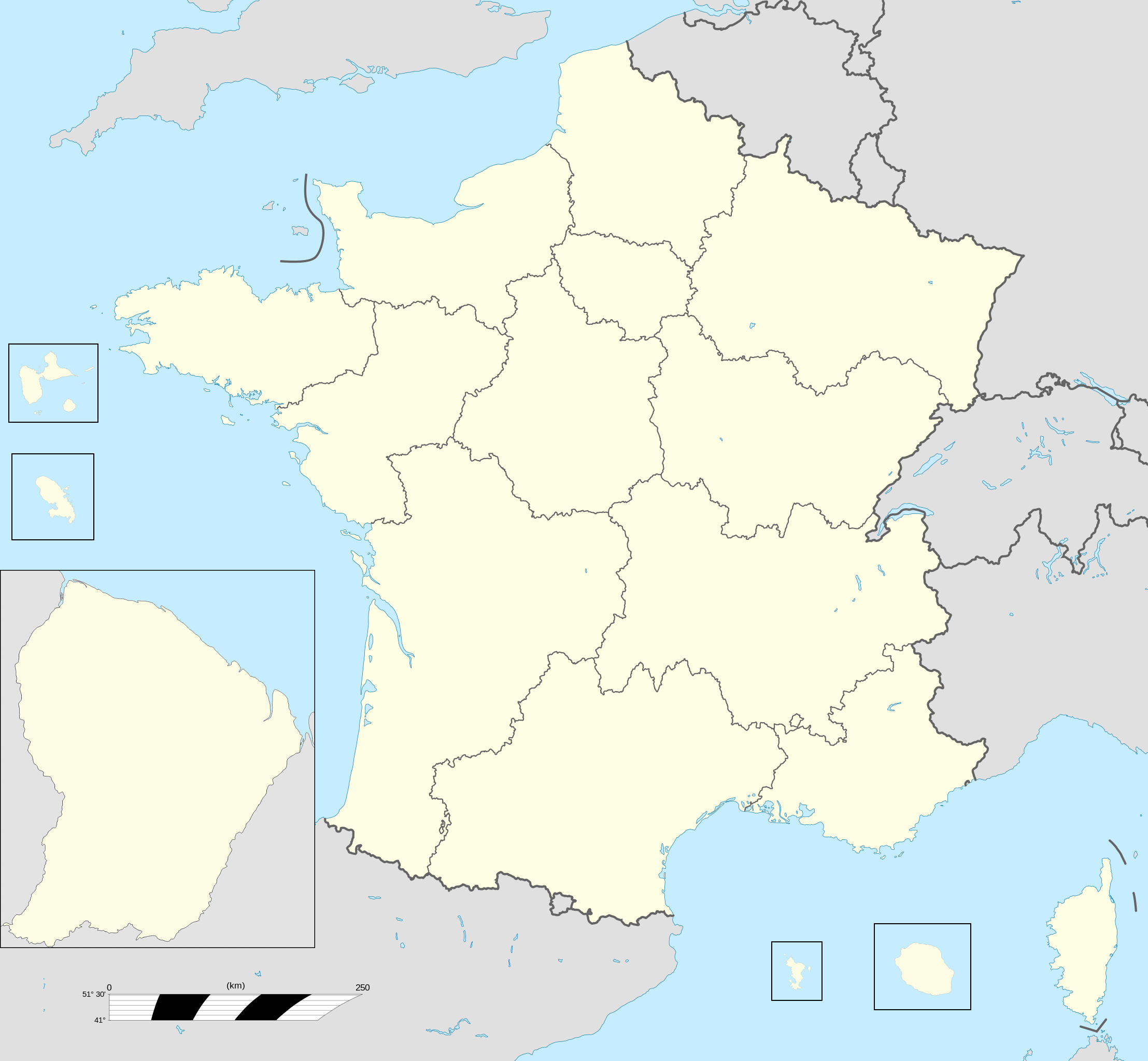

Before 2016

From January, 1st 2016

1. Alsace
2. Aquitaine
3. Auvergne
4. Lower Normandy
5. Burgundy
6. Brittany
7. Centre-Val de Loire
8. Champagne-Ardenne
9. Corsica (special status)
10. Franche-Comté
11. Upper Normandy

12. Île-de-France
13. Languedoc-Roussillon
14. Limousin
15. Lorraine
16. Midi-Pyrénées
17. Nord-Pas de Calais
18. Pays de la Loire
19. Picardy
20. Poitou-Charentes
21. Provence-Alpes-Côte d'Azur
22. Rhône-Alpes

1. Bourgogne-Franche-Comté
2. Nouvelle-Aquitaine
3. Auvergne-Rhône-Alpes
4. Normandy
5. Grand Est
6. Brittany
7. Centre-Val de Loire
8. Occitanie
9. Hauts-de-France
10. Île-de-France
11. Pays de la Loire

12. Provence-Alpes-Côte d'Azur
13. Corsica (special status)

===== Departments of France =====
Departments of France French departments are roughly analogous to British counties.

Departments and Regions of France

INSEE code	Arms	Department	Prefecture
01		Ain	Bourg-en-Bresse
02		Aisne	Laon
03		Allier	Moulins
04		Alpes-de-Haute-Provence	Digne-les-Bains
05		Hautes-Alpes	Gap
06		Alpes-Maritimes	Nice
07		Ardèche	Privas
08		Ardennes	Charleville-Mézières
09		Ariège	Foix
10		Aube	Troyes
11		Aude	Carcassonne
12		Aveyron	Rodez
13		Bouches-du-Rhône	Marseille
14		Calvados	Caen
15		Cantal	Aurillac
16		Charente	Angoulême
17		Charente-Maritime	La Rochelle
18		Cher	Bourges
19		Corrèze	Tulle
2A		Corse-du-Sud	Ajaccio
2B		Haute-Corse	Bastia
21		Côte-d'Or	Dijon
22		Côtes-d'Armor	Saint-Brieuc
23		Creuse	Guéret
24		Dordogne	Périgueux
25		Doubs	Besançon
26		Drôme	Valence
27		Eure	Évreux
28		Eure-et-Loir	Chartres
29		Finistère	Quimper
30		Gard	Nîmes
31		Haute-Garonne	Toulouse
32		Gers	Auch
33		Gironde	Bordeaux
34		Hérault	Montpellier
35		Ille-et-Vilaine	Rennes
36		Indre	Châteauroux
37		Indre-et-Loire	Tours
38		Isère	Grenoble
39		Jura	Lons-le-Saunier
40		Landes	Mont-de-Marsan
41		Loir-et-Cher	Blois
42		Loire	Saint-Étienne
43		Haute-Loire	Le Puy-en-Velay
44		Loire-Atlantique	Nantes
45		Loiret	Orléans
46		Lot	Cahors
47		Lot-et-Garonne	Agen
48		Lozère	Mende
49		Maine-et-Loire	Angers
50		Manche	Saint-Lô
51		Marne	Châlons-en-Champagne
52		Haute-Marne	Chaumont
53		Mayenne	Laval
54		Meurthe-et-Moselle	Nancy
55		Meuse	Bar-le-Duc
56		Morbihan	Vannes
57		Moselle	Metz
58		Nièvre	Nevers
59		Nord	Lille
60		Oise	Beauvais
61		Orne	Alençon
62		Pas-de-Calais	Arras
63		Puy-de-Dôme	Clermont-Ferrand
64		Pyrénées-Atlantiques	Pau
65		Hautes-Pyrénées	Tarbes
66		Pyrénées-Orientales	Perpignan
67		Bas-Rhin	Strasbourg
68		Haut-Rhin	Colmar
69		Rhône	Lyon
70		Haute-Saône	Vesoul
71		Saône-et-Loire	Mâcon
72		Sarthe	Le Mans
73		Savoie	Chambéry
74		Haute-Savoie	Annecy
75		Paris	Paris
76		Seine-Maritime	Rouen
77		Seine-et-Marne	Melun
78		Yvelines	Versailles
79		Deux-Sèvres	Niort
80		Somme	Amiens
81		Tarn	Albi
82		Tarn-et-Garonne	Montauban
83		Var	Toulon
84		Vaucluse	Avignon
85		Vendée	La Roche-sur-Yon
86		Vienne	Poitiers
87		Haute-Vienne	Limoges
88		Vosges	Épinal
89		Yonne	Auxerre
90		Territoire de Belfort	Belfort
91		Essonne	Évry
92		Hauts-de-Seine	Nanterre
93		Seine-Saint-Denis	Bobigny
94		Val-de-Marne	Créteil
95		Val-d'Oise	Cergy/Pontoise
971		Guadeloupe	Basse-Terre
972		Martinique	Fort-de-France
973		Guyane	Cayenne
974		La Réunion	Saint-Denis
976		Mayotte	Mamoudzou

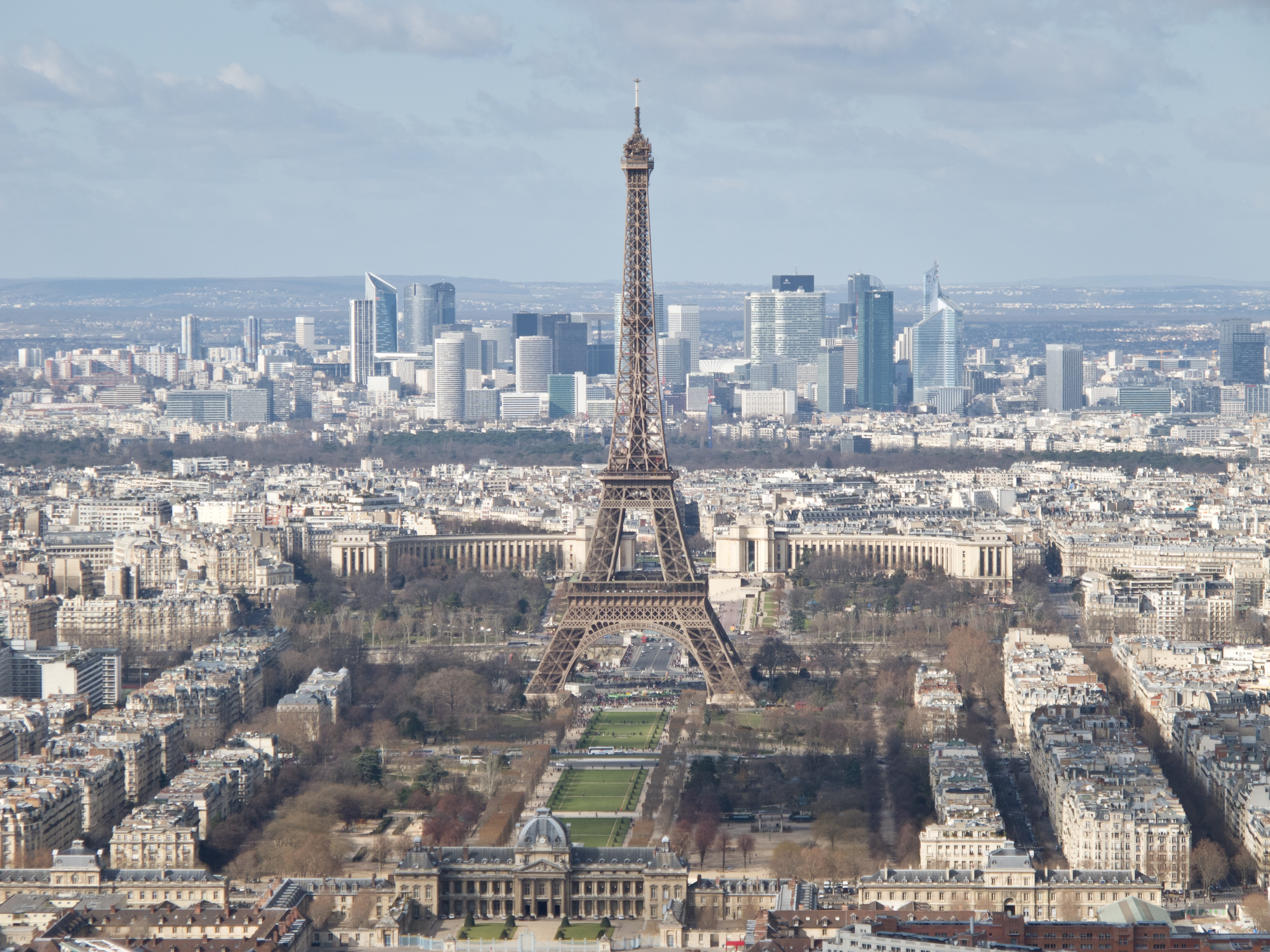
The Eiffel Tower, with the skyline of Paris in the background

===== Municipalities of France =====
- Cities of France
  - Capital of France: Paris – also the largest city in France, with over 2,000,000 inhabitants
  - Strasbourg – official seat of the European Parliament
  - Lyon – silk capital of the world and the location of the headquarters of Interpol and Euronews
  - Marseille – France's largest commercial port

=== Neighbors of France ===
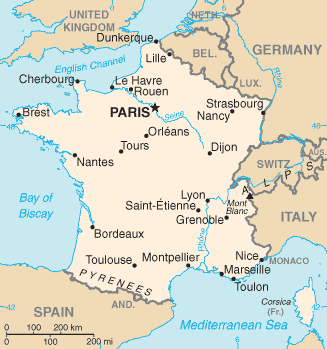
Map showing France and its neighbours

Metropolitan France is bordered by:

- Belgium
- Luxembourg
- Germany
- Switzerland
- Italy
- Monaco
- Andorra
- Spain

France is also linked to:

- United Kingdom (by the Channel Tunnel, which passes underneath the English Channel)

France's overseas departments share borders with:

- Brazil (borders French Guiana)
- Suriname (borders French Guiana)
- Sint Maarten (borders Saint-Martin)

== Government and politics of France ==
- Form of government: unitary semi-presidential republic
- Capital of France: Paris
- Constitutional Council of France
- Elections in France
  - French presidential elections: 1848 – 1958 – 1965 – 1969 – 1974 – 1981 – 1988 – 1995 – 2002 – 2007 – 2012 – 2017 – 2022
  - French parliamentary elections: 1795 – 1798 – 1815 – 1816 – 1820 – 1824 – 1827 – 1830 – 1831 – 1834 – 1837 – 1839 – 1842 – 1846 – 1848 – 1849 – 1852 – 1857 – 1863 – 1869 – 1871 (Feb) – 1871 (Jul) – 1876 – 1877 – 1881 – 1885 – 1889 – 1893 – 1898 – 1902 – 1906 – 1910 – 1914 – 1919 – 1924 – 1928 – 1932 – 1936 – 1945 – 1946 (Jun) – 1946 (Nov) – 1951 – 1956 – 1958 – 1962 – 1967 – 1968 – 1973 – 1978 – 1981 – 1986 – 1988 – 1993 – 1997 – 2002 – 2007 – 2012 – 2017 – 2022 – 2024
  - French referendums: 1793 – 1795 – 1800 – 1802 – 1804 – 1815 – 1851 – 1852 – 1870 – 1945 – 1946 (May) – 1946 (Oct) – 1958 – 1961 – 1962 (Jun) – 1962 (Oct) – 1969 – 1972 – 1988 – 1992 – 2000 – 2005
- Feminism in France
- Foreign relations of France
- Liberalism and radicalism in France
- Political parties in France
- Political scandals of France
- Taxation in France

=== Branches of the government of France ===
==== Executive branch ====
Emmanuel Macron, current President of France

- Head of state: President of the French Republic
- Le Gouvernement (Cabinet of ministers)
  - Head of government: Prime Minister of France
  - Ministries of France
  - Minister of Foreign Affairs
  - Minister of the Interior
  - Minister of Overseas France
  - Minister of the Environment
  - Minister of Transportation
  - Minister of Public Works
  - Minister of the Economy, Finance and Industry
  - Minister of Defence
  - Minister of Justice
  - Minister of National Education
  - Minister of Higher Education and Research
  - Minister of Culture
  - Minister of Agriculture
  - Minister of Tourism
  - Minister of the Sea
  - Minister of Health
  - Minister of Youth Affairs and Sports
  - Minister of Budget, Public Accounting and Civil Servants
  - Minister of Immigration, Integration, National identity and Co-development
  - Minister of Social Affairs
  - Minister of Housing

==== Legislative branch ====
- Parliament of France (Parlement) (see also: Congress of France)
  - French National Assembly (Assemblée Nationale)
  - French Senate (Sénat)
- French Economic and Social Council (consultative assembly)

==== Judicial branch ====
- Constitutional Council of France

=== International relations of France ===
==== Foreign relations ====
- Foreign relations of France
- Foreign policy of François Mitterrand
- France is a nuclear power
- France–Africa relations
- France–Americas relations
- France–Asia relations
- Evolution of the French Empire
- French colonial empire
- French colonisation of the Americas
- International relations, 1648–1814
- International relations (1814–1919)
- Aftermath of World War I
- International relations (1919–1939)
- Diplomatic History of World War II
- Cold War
  - Foreign policy of Charles de Gaulle
- International relations since 1989

==== International organization membership ====
The French Republic is a member of:

- African Development Bank Group (AfDB) (nonregional member)
- African Union/United Nations Hybrid operation in Darfur (UNAMID)
- Arctic Council (observer)
- Asian Development Bank (ADB) (nonregional member)
- Australia Group
- Bank for International Settlements (BIS)
- Black Sea Economic Cooperation Zone (BSEC) (observer)
- Confederation of European Paper Industries (CEPI)
- Conference des Ministres des Finances des Pays de la Zone Franc (FZ)
- Council of Europe (CE)
- Council of the Baltic Sea States (CBSS) (observer)
- Development Bank of Central African States (BDEAC)
- Economic and Monetary Union (EMU)
- Euro-Atlantic Partnership Council (EAPC)
- European Bank for Reconstruction and Development (EBRD)
- European Investment Bank (EIB)
- European Organization for Nuclear Research (CERN)
- European Space Agency (ESA)
- European Union (EU)
- Food and Agriculture Organization (FAO)
- Group of Five (G5)
- Group of Seven (G7)
- Group of Eight (G8)
- Group of Ten (G10)
- Group of Twenty Finance Ministers and Central Bank Governors (G20)
- Indian Ocean Commission (InOC)
- Inter-American Development Bank (IADB)
- International Atomic Energy Agency (IAEA)
- International Bank for Reconstruction and Development (IBRD)
- International Chamber of Commerce (ICC)
- International Civil Aviation Organization (ICAO)
- International Criminal Court (ICCt)
- International Criminal Police Organization (Interpol)
- International Development Association (IDA)
- International Energy Agency (IEA)
- International Federation of Red Cross and Red Crescent Societies (IFRCS)
- International Finance Corporation (IFC)
- International Fund for Agricultural Development (IFAD)
- International Hydrographic Organization (IHO)
- International Labour Organization (ILO)
- International Maritime Organization (IMO)
- International Mobile Satellite Organization (IMSO)
- International Monetary Fund (IMF)
- International Olympic Committee (IOC)
- International Organization for Migration (IOM)
- International Organization for Standardization (ISO)
- International Red Cross and Red Crescent Movement (ICRM)
- International Telecommunication Union (ITU)
- International Telecommunications Satellite Organization (ITSO)
- International Trade Union Confederation (ITUC)
- Inter-Parliamentary Union (IPU)
- Multilateral Investment Guarantee Agency (MIGA)
- North Atlantic Treaty Organization (NATO)
- Nuclear Energy Agency (NEA)
- Nuclear Suppliers Group (NSG)
- Organisation internationale de la Francophonie (OIF)
- Organisation for Economic Co-operation and Development (OECD)
- Organization for Security and Cooperation in Europe (OSCE)
- Organisation for the Prohibition of Chemical Weapons (OPCW)
- Organization of American States (OAS) (observer)
- Pacific Islands Forum (PIF) (partner)
- Paris Club
- Permanent Court of Arbitration (PCA)
- Schengen Convention
- Secretariat of the Pacific Community (SPC)
- Southeast European Cooperative Initiative (SECI) (observer)
- Union Latine
- United Nations (UN)
- United Nations Conference on Trade and Development (UNCTAD)
- United Nations Educational, Scientific, and Cultural Organization (UNESCO)
- United Nations High Commissioner for Refugees (UNHCR)
- United Nations Industrial Development Organization (UNIDO)
- United Nations Institute for Training and Research (UNITAR)
- United Nations Interim Force in Lebanon (UNIFIL)
- United Nations Mission for the Referendum in Western Sahara (MINURSO)
- United Nations Mission in Liberia (UNMIL)
- United Nations Mission in the Central African Republic and Chad (MINURCAT)
- United Nations Observer Mission in Georgia (UNOMIG)
- United Nations Operation in Cote d'Ivoire (UNOCI)
- United Nations Organization Mission in the Democratic Republic of the Congo (MONUC)
- United Nations Relief and Works Agency for Palestine Refugees in the Near East (UNRWA)
- United Nations Security Council (permanent member)
- United Nations Stabilization Mission in Haiti (MINUSTAH)
- United Nations Truce Supervision Organization (UNTSO)
- Universal Postal Union (UPU)
- West African Development Bank (WADB) (nonregional)
- Western European Union (WEU)
- World Confederation of Labour (WCL)
- World Customs Organization (WCO)
- World Federation of Trade Unions (WFTU)
- World Health Organization (WHO)
- World Intellectual Property Organization (WIPO)
- World Meteorological Organization (WMO)
- World Organization of the Scout Movement
- World Tourism Organization (UNWTO)
- World Trade Organization (WTO)
- World Veterans Federation
- Zangger Committee (ZC)

=== Law of France ===
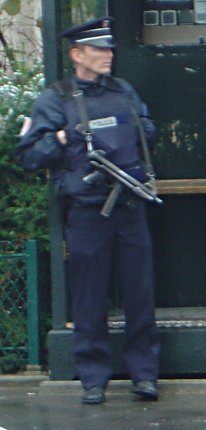
A policeman armed with a submachine gun guarding a police station in Paris

- Adoption in France
- Cannabis in France
- Capital punishment in France
- Census in France
- Constitution of France
- Crime in France
  - List of major crimes in France (1900–present)
  - Polygamy in France
- Law enforcement in France
  - National law enforcement agencies
    - National Police ("Police Nationale")
    - National Gendarmerie ("Gendarmerie Nationale")
      - Mobile Gendarmerie ("Gendarmerie Mobile")
  - Local law enforcement agencies
    - Police municipale (Municipal police) – may be maintained by local governments (communes), but have very limited law enforcement powers outside of traffic issues and local ordinance enforcement
    - Garde champetre or Police Rurale (Rural police) – may be formed by Rural communes, and are responsible for limited local patrol and protecting the environment
    - Équipes régionales d’intervention et de sécurité (SWAT teams) – are operated by The Department of Corrections (the prison system or Administration pénitentiaire)
    - In Wallis and Futuna, there is a territorial guard as well as royal police.
- Human rights in France
  - Abortion in France
  - Censorship in France
  - Declaration of the Rights of Man and of the Citizen
  - Gambling in France
  - LGBT rights in France
  - Prostitution in France
  - Smoking in France

==== Historical law ====
- Napoleonic Code

=== Military of France ===
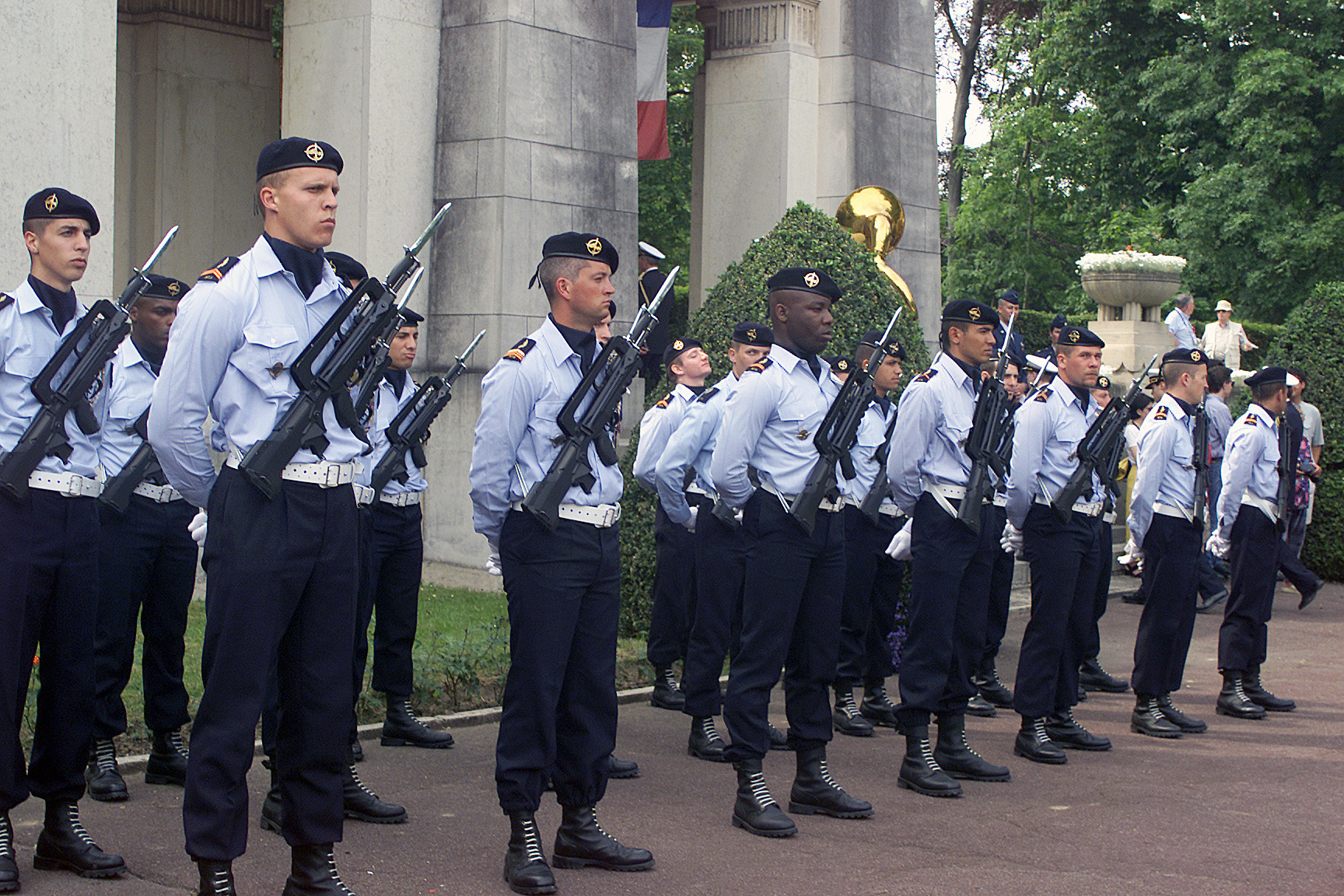
French Armed Forces, armed with FAMAS F1 assault rifles, await for the opening of the Memorial Day ceremony at the LaFayette Escadrille Monument in Paris, France.

- Command
  - Commander-in-chief:
    - Ministry of Defence of France
- French Armed Forces
  - French Army (Armée de Terre)
    - French Foreign Legion
    - Ranks in the French Army
  - French Navy (Marine Nationale)
    - Ranks in the French Navy
  - French Air Force (Armée de l'Air)
  - National Gendarmerie (Gendarmerie Nationale)
- Military history of France

== History of France ==
=== General topics ===
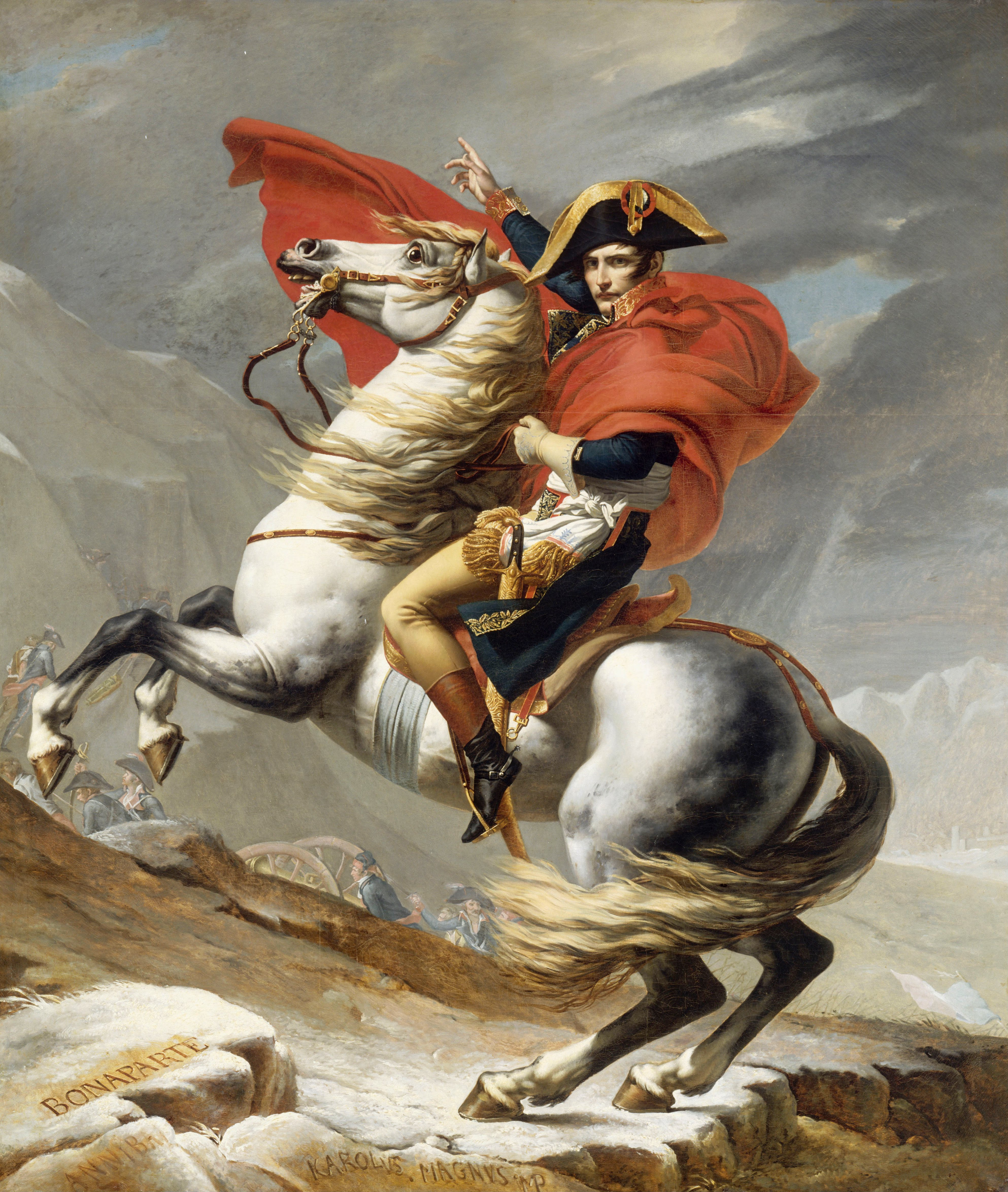
Napoleon Crossing the Alps, by Jacques-Louis David. Portrait of Napoleon Bonaparte

- Territorial formation of France
- Historical French provinces
- Cultural history of France
  - Art history of France
  - Literary history of France
- Colonial history of France
- Demographics of France
- Economic history of France
- Historical positions and figures
  - Prime Ministers of France
  - Constable of France
- Military history of France
  - Military history of France during World War II

=== By period ===
- Ancient history
  - Prehistoric France
  - Celtic Gaul
  - Roman Gaul (50 BC–486)
  - The Franks
  - Merovingians (481–751)
- France in the Middle Ages
  - Carolingians (751–987)
  - Direct Capetians (987–1328)
  - Valois (direct) (1328–1498)
- Early Modern France (1492–1792)
  - Valois-Orléans (1498–1515)
  - Valois-Angoulême (1515–1589)
  - House of Bourbon (1589–1792)
  - French Revolution (1789)
- France in the 19th century
  - First Republic (1792–1804)
  - National Convention (1792–1795)
  - Directory (1795–1799)
  - Napoleonic era (timeline)
    - Consulate (1799–1804)
    - First Empire (1804–1814)
  - Restoration (1814–1830)
  - July Revolution (1830)
  - July Monarchy (1830–1848)
  - 1848 Revolution
  - Second Republic (1848–1852)
  - Second Empire (1852–1870)
  - Third Republic (1870–1940)
  - Paris Commune (1871)
- France in the 20th century
  - Great Depression in France
  - Vichy France (1940–1944)
  - Provisional Government (1944–1946)
  - Fourth Republic (1946–1958)
  - Fifth Republic (1958–present)

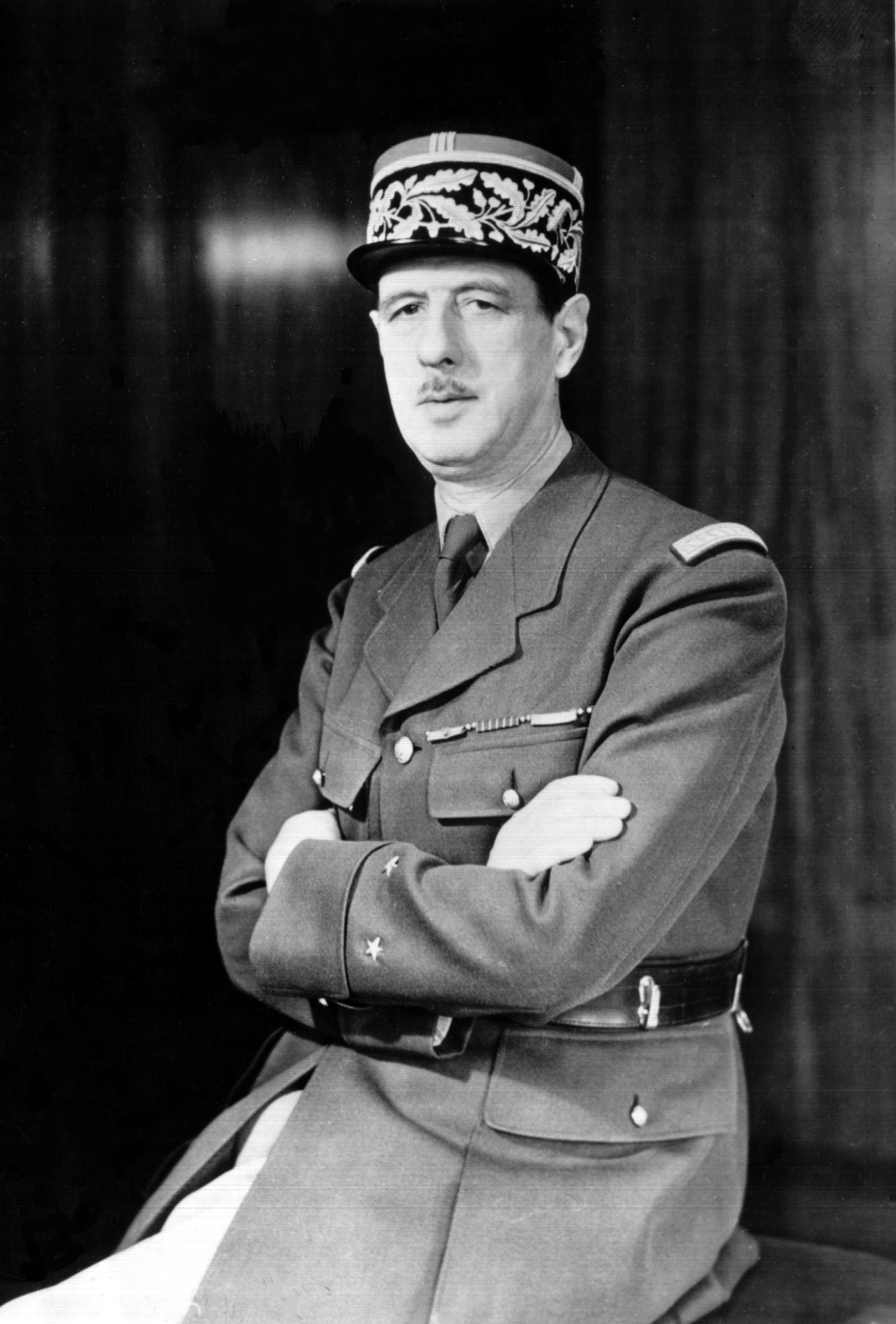
Charles de Gaulle was the leader (and General) of the Free French Forces during World War II, he founded the Provisional Government of the French Republic, was a prime minister of the French Fourth Republic, and was the first president of the French Fifth Republic.

== Culture of France ==
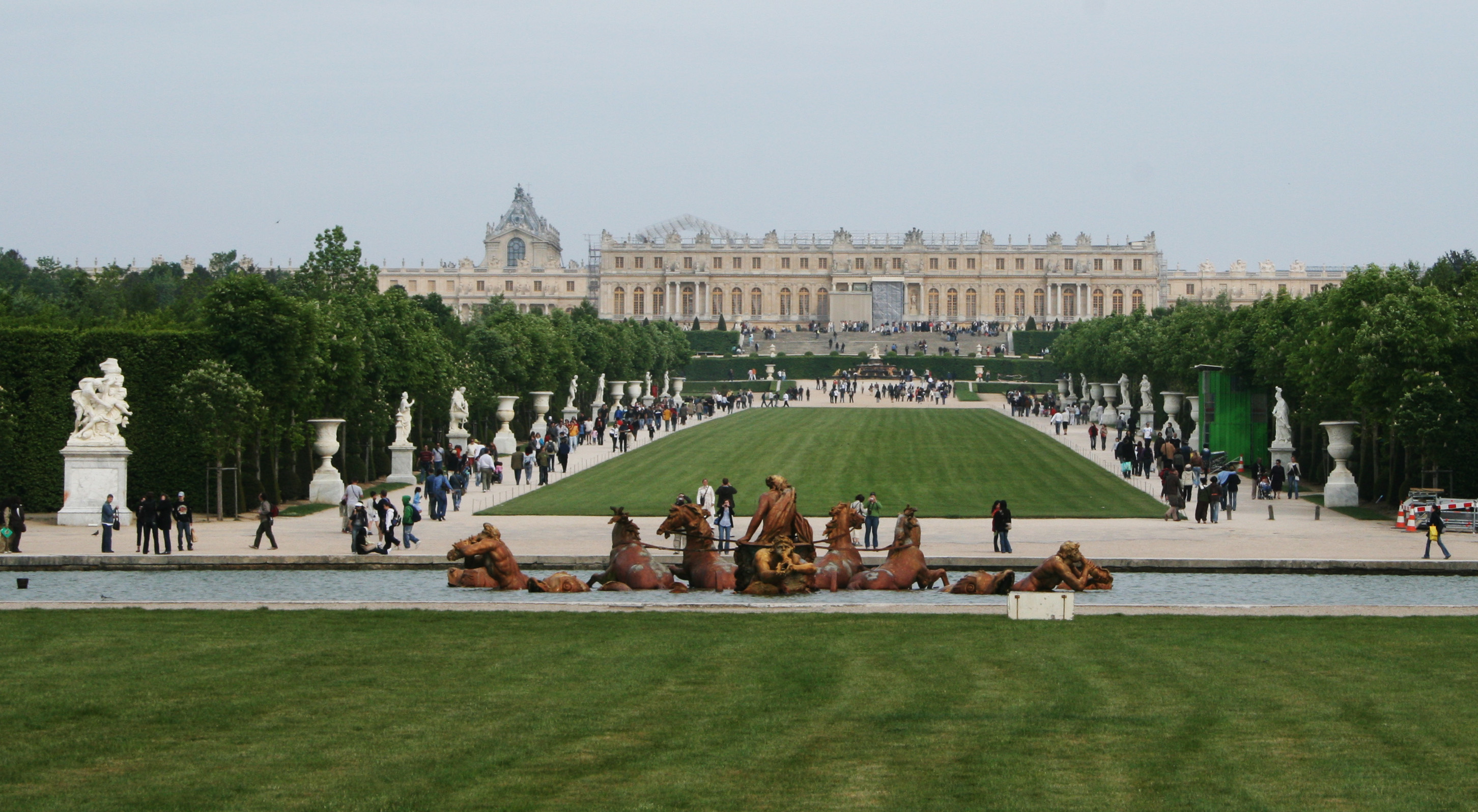
Palace of Versailles

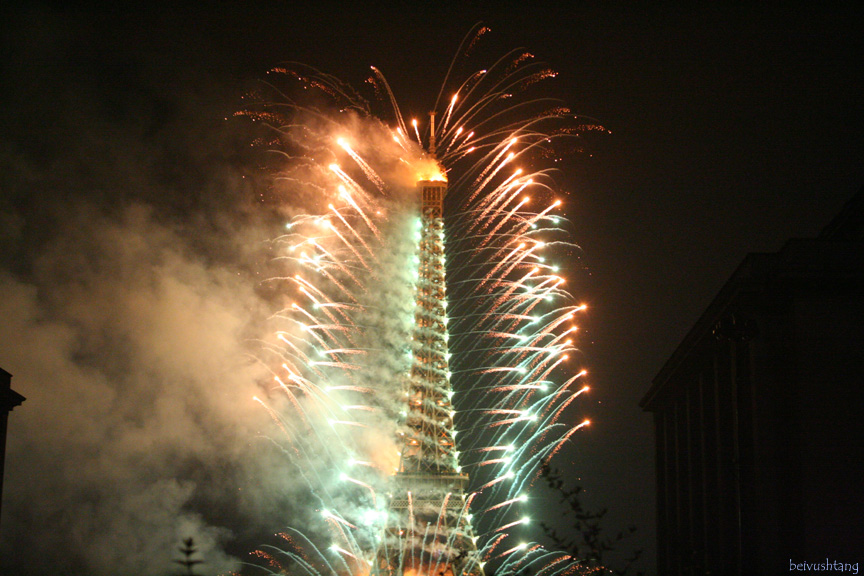
Eiffel Tower on Bastille Day

The Louvre Museum, in Paris, is home to many of the world's greatest masterpieces of art, including the Mona Lisa.

- Architecture of France
  - French Baroque architecture
  - French Colonial
  - French Gothic architecture
  - French Renaissance architecture
  - French Restoration style
  - French Romanesque architecture
- Art in France
  - Museums in France
  - Literature of France
    - French novelists
  - Music of France
    - French rock
  - Theatre in France
    - French playwrights
- Cuisine of France
- Cultural icons of France
- Languages of France
- Media in France
  - Cinema of France
  - Television in France
- Mythology in France
- National symbols of France
  - Coat of arms of France
  - Flag of France
  - National anthem of France
- People of France
  - Ethnic minorities in France
    - Armenians in France
    - Chinese diaspora in France
    - Koreans in France
    - Turks in France
- Public holidays in France
- Racism in France
- Scouting and Guiding in France
- World Heritage Sites in France (See also Transboundary sites)

=== Religion and belief systems in France ===
- Belief systems
  - Humanism in France
  - Irreligion and atheism in France
- Religion in France
  - Freedom of religion in France
  - Religions in France
    - Buddhism in France
    - Christianity in France
      - Eastern Orthodoxy in France
      - Oriental Orthodoxy in France
      - Protestantism in France
      - Roman Catholicism in France
    - Hinduism in France
    - Islam in France
    - Judaism in France
    - Scientology in France
    - Sikhism in France

=== Sports in France ===
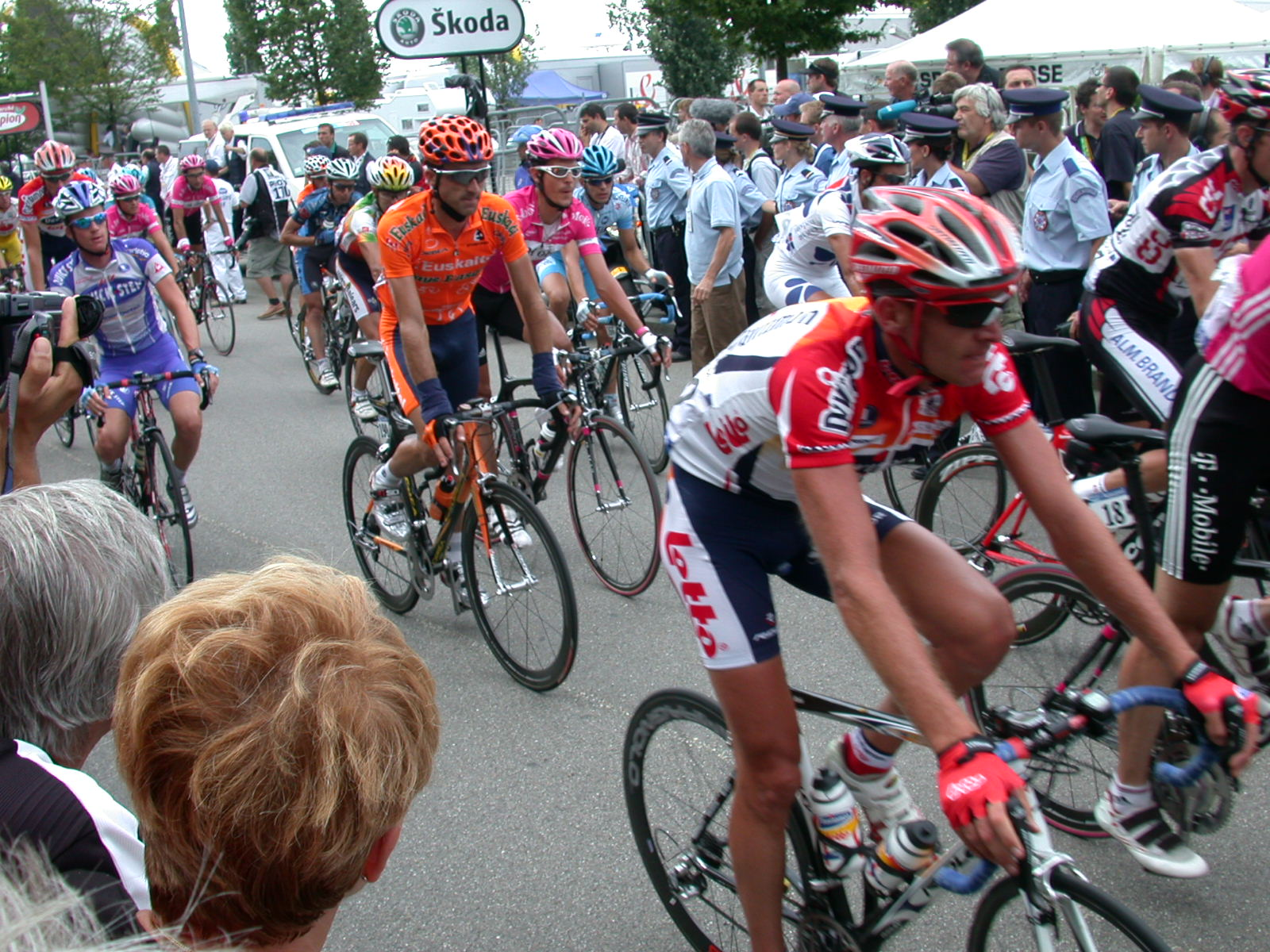
Tour de France 2005: Arrival in Mulhouse from Gérardmer

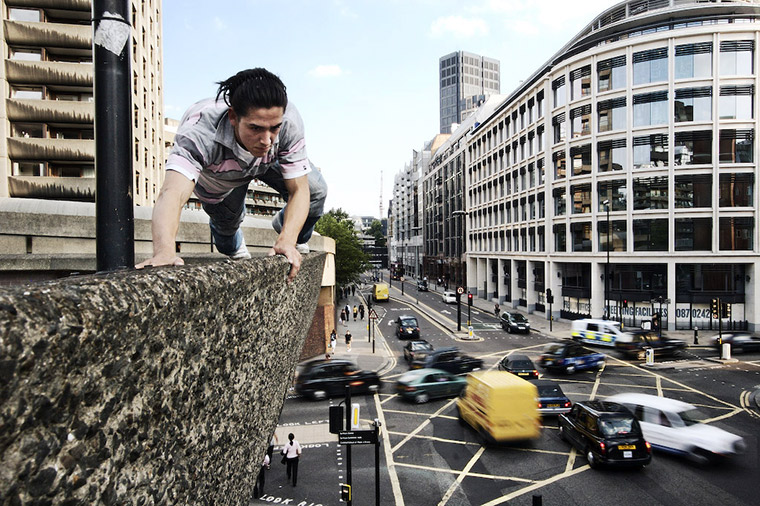
A traceur – a practitioner of parkour – performs an équilibre de chat (cat balance).

Sport articles specific to France:

- Fédération Française de Basket-Ball
- Football in France
- France at the Olympics: the modern Olympics were invented in France, in 1894
- Grand Prix de France
- French Open (tennis)
- Open de France
- Pétanque
- Parkour ('urban running')
- Rugby in France:
  - Rugby union in France
  - Rugby League in France
- Tour de France
- Alps Tour
- France men's national handball team

== Economy and infrastructure of France ==
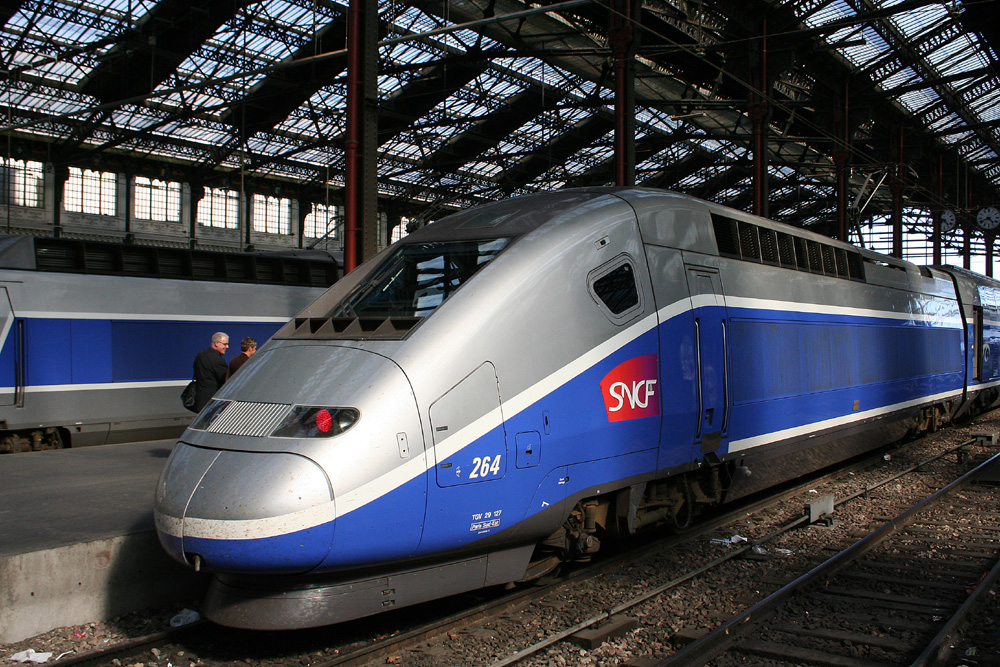
TGV Duplex in Paris, Gare de Lyon. TGV stands for train à grande vitesse, which is French for "train of great speed"), and is the name of France's high-speed rail service.

France is the most visited country in the world, receiving over 79 million foreign tourists annually (including business visitors, but excluding people staying less than 24 hours in France).

- Economic rank
  - Nominal GDP: 6th (sixth)
  - GDP (PPP): 8th (eighth)
- Agriculture in France
- Banking in France
- Communications in France
  - Newspapers in France
  - Radio in France
  - Telecommunications in France
    - Internet in France
    - Television in France
- Companies of France

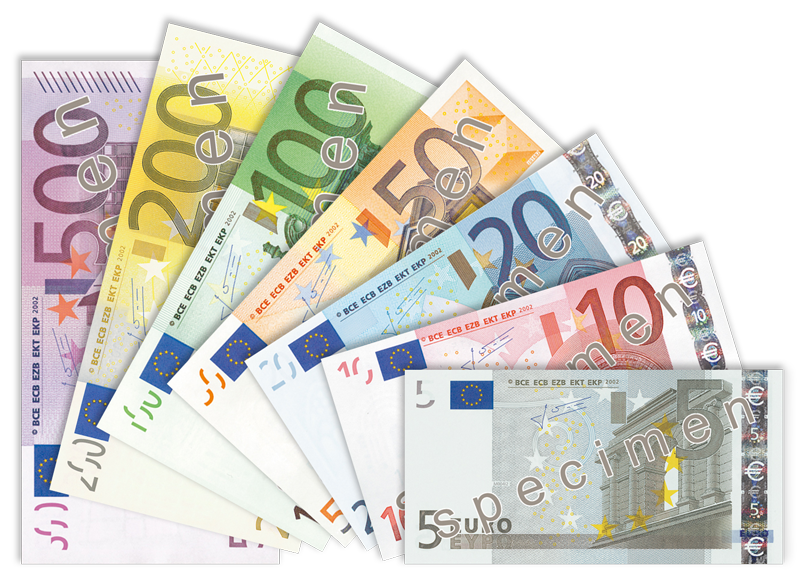
Euro banknotes

- Currency of France: Euro (see also: Euro topics)
  - ISO 4217: EUR
- Economic history of France
- Energy in France
  - Nuclear power in France
  - Renewable energy in France
- Health care in France
  - Emergency medical services in France
- Poverty in France
- Tourism in France
  - Eiffel Tower
- Transport in France
  - Airports in France
  - Highway system of France
  - Rail transport in France
    - Trams in France
- Water supply and sanitation in France

== Education in France ==
The three stages of the education process in France:

- Primary education (enseignement primaire)
- Secondary education (enseignement secondaire)
  - Collèges – cater for the first four years of secondary education from the ages of 11 to 15, equivalent to middle schools
  - Lycées – provide a three-year course of further secondary education for children between the ages of 15 and 18, during which pupils are prepared for the baccalauréat (commonly referred to as le bac), which happens between the end of the penultimate year (for the French-language exam), and the end of the last year
- Higher education (enseignement supérieur)
  - Colleges and universities in France
    - Public universities of France
  - Grandes écoles

== Health in France ==
- Hospitals in France
- Obesity in France

== See also ==
- List of international rankings
- Member state of the European Union
- Member state of the Group of Twenty Finance Ministers and Central Bank Governors
- Member state of the North Atlantic Treaty Organization
- Member state of the United Nations
- Outline of Europe
- Outline of geography
