= Movement Party (France) =

Movement Party Parti du mouvement
- Leader: Jacques Laffitte; Odilon Barrot; Adolphe Thiers
- Founded: 1831; 195 years ago
- Dissolved: 1848; 178 years ago
- Preceded by: Doctrinaires
- Merged into: Party of Order
- Newspaper: Le National; Le Siècle
- Ideology: Liberalism (French); Nationalism; Progressivism; Orléanism
- Political position: Centre-left
- Colours: Rose
- Politics of France; Political parties; Elections; A: Movement Party, along with Resistance Party, was a major monarchist party during the July Monarchy period. The Movement Party were more conservative compared to the progressive Republicans (left-wing), but were more progressive/moderate than the centre-right Resistance Party.

The Movement Party (French: Parti du Mouvement) was a centre-left liberal monarchist political group during the July Monarchy.

The party sat on the centre-left of the Chamber of Deputies between the small leftist republican opposition and the centrist conservative-liberal Third Party, but to the left from the conservative Resistance Party.

== History ==
The founder of the Movement Party was Jacques Laffitte, an Orléanist banker who supported the July Revolution of 1830. King Louis Philippe I asked Lafitte to form a government, but it lasted only six months because the King became more conservative over time. The party members were Orléanists who believed that the Charter of 1830 was a step toward a more democratic regime and they actively supported progressive policies such as a strong parliamentary system, expanded suffrage and self-determination against foreign interests.

After the fall of Lafitte, Adolphe Thiers became party leader. Thiers was well connected to the King and became Minister of the Interior in Édouard Mortier's cabinet. As Minister of the Interior, Thiers was charged with repressing the Canut revolts of 1834. He also supported repressive laws after Giuseppe Marco Fieschi's assassination attempt against Louis Philippe. Thiers was appointed Prime Minister briefly for two brief stints in 1836 and 1840, but his political fortune fell when his support to Muhammad Ali's independence claim from the Ottoman Empire caused tensions with United Kingdom and Prussia.

Once confined to the opposition, the Movement Party united with the other groups hostile towards the conservative governments of Louis Philippe. The party launched several Campagne des banquets to support expanded suffrage. The party dissolved after the tensions of 1848–1849 exploded into the February Revolution that brought to Louis Philippe's fall and birth of the Second French Republic. Many members of the Movement Party became Moderate Republicans or merged in the Party of Order.

== Electoral results ==
Chamber of Deputies
Election year	No. of overall votes	% of overall vote	No. of overall seats won	+/–	Leader
1834	21,073 (2nd)	16.3	75 / 460	▼207	Jacques Laffitte
1837	46,426 (2nd)	30.6	142 / 464	▲67	Adolphe Thiers
1839	87,352 (2nd)	43.4	199 / 459	▲57	Adolphe Thiers
1842	Unknown (2d)	42.0	193 / 459	▼6	Adolphe Thiers
1846	90,282 (2nd)	36.7	168 / 459	▼25	Adolphe Thiers

== See also ==
- History of France
