= List of elections in 1815 =

Election

The following elections occurred in the year 1815:

- 1815 French legislative election (disambiguation)
  - May 1815 French legislative election
  - August 1815 French legislative election
- 1815 French constitutional referendum
- 1815 Norwegian parliamentary election
- United States Senate election in New York, 1815

== See also ==
- Category:1815 elections
