= 1842 French legislative election =

← 1839	9 July 1842	1846 →
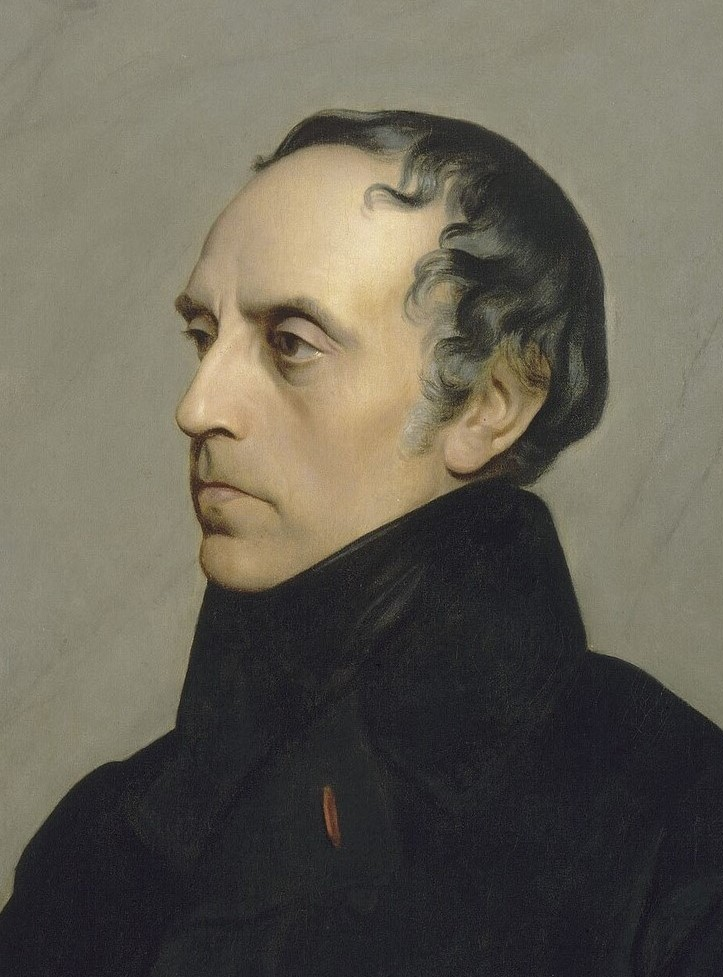

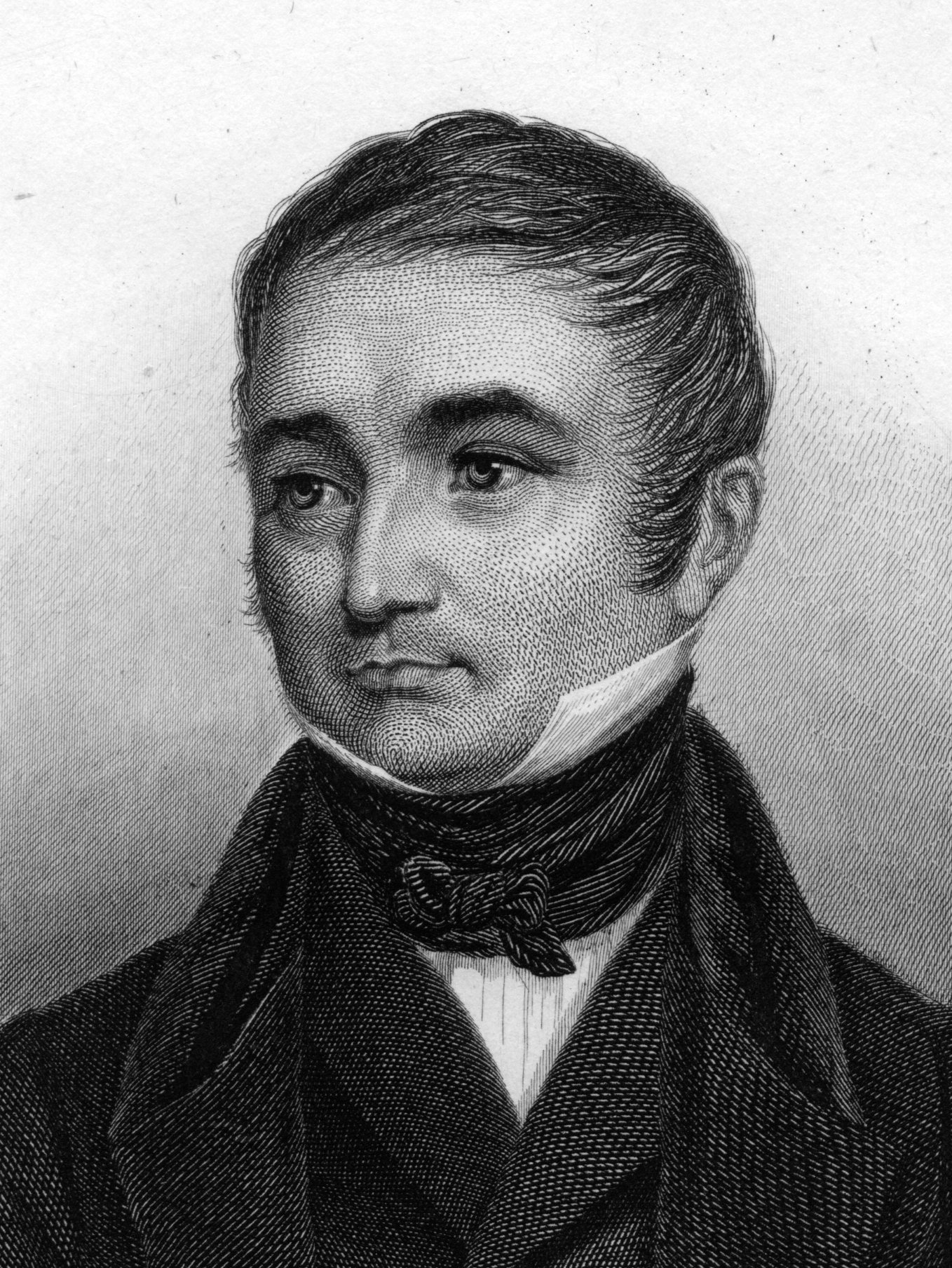
	First party	Second party
Leader	François Guizot	Adolphe Thiers
Party	Resistance Party	Opposition
Seats won	266	193
Prime Minister before election
Jean-de-Dieu Soult
Resistance Party
Elected Prime Minister
Jean-de-Dieu Soult
Resistance Party

Legislative elections were held in France on 9 July 1842. Only citizens paying taxes were eligible to vote.

== Results ==
Party	Votes	%	Seats
Resistance Party			266
Opposition			193
Total			459
Total votes	173,694	–	
Registered voters/turnout	220,040	78.94	
Source: Nohlen & Stöver, Rois et Presidents

== Aftermath ==
Louis-Philippe of France dissolved the legislature on 16 July 1846.
