= 1793 French constitutional referendum =

A constitutional referendum was held in France in 1793 and 1794. While most voting took place in July 1793, the last day of voting was not until 4 April 1794 when residents of Châteaulin voted. The new constitution was approved by over 99% of voters. However, due to the 13 Vendémiaire, the constitution was never enacted.

== Results ==
Due to the ongoing Reign of Terror no official result was never published. René Baticle collated a best estimate of the figures after reviewing the available minutes from assembly meetings; however, of the 5–6,000 assemblies, over 400 failed to transmit their results or figures.

Choice	Votes	%
Yes, without conditions	1,714,266	91.84
Yes, with conditions	139,581	7.48
No	12,766	0.68
Total	1,866,613	100.00
Valid votes	1,866,613	99.87
Invalid votes	1,065	0.06
Blank votes	1,326	0.07
Total votes	1,869,004	100.00
Source: Lavisse, Direct Democracy
