= Obesity in France =

Although France maintains lower obesity rates than its European neighbours and many other developed countries, Obesity in France remains a major public health concern.

== History ==
Obesity levels in France doubled between 1995 and 2004 (to 11.3% of the population). In 2001 France was reported to have had the lowest obesity rate in Europe.

Nord-Pas-de-Calais is considered the fattest region in France. Fifty-one percent of the population here is considered either overweight or obese. This is in contrast with France's national average at 42 percent. Between 1992 and 2000, in the region, obesity in girls doubled while the total for boys grew by 195%.

=== Recent history ===
France became the first European Union country to state that childhood obesity rates have started to level off while drastic increase in childhood obesity rates continue in most European countries. France is approximately ranked in the middle European childhood obesity rates rankings. Researchers have said this is caused from "government policies, a growing awareness of the dangers of obesity and the fact that children are eating less".

McDonald's is more profitable in France than anywhere else in Europe. Sales have increased 42% over the past five years. Some 1.2 million French, or 2 percent of the population, eat there every day.

== Causes ==
Blame has been put on fast food, ultra-processed food, the widespread presences of unhealthy snacks, sedentary lifestyle and the loss of "common food culture". The French tradition of not opening the refrigerator between meals for a child isn't as prevalent as it once was. Fat content in the French diet has increased steadily to the point where it is predicted that obesity-related diseases will start to increase.

The French connect food to pleasure and they enjoy eating, considering meals a celebration of their cuisine.

== Social correlations ==
Obesity affects disproportionately low income individuals and is one marker of social inequality. A study conducted by French researchers has shown that poor children are up to three times more likely to be obese compared to children growing up in more affluent families. A 2024 study found that 20.7% of workers and just 12.6% of senior executives were obese.

== Action ==
In September 2005, France passed a law banning soda-and-snack-selling vending machines from public schools and misleading television and print food advertising. France also put in place 1.5% tax on the advertising budgets of food companies that did not encourage healthy eating.

In 2012, the country implemented a soda tax, with rates ranging from 3.34€ to 29.09€ per hectoliter of drink, depending on the amount of added sugar, which varied from 10g/L to 150g/L respectively. And drinks with sweetener are sold at the minimal price of 3,34 € per hectoliter. The tax applies only to beverages with any quantity of added sugar and does not include naturally sweetened drinks such as fruit juices. When the product contains both sweetener and added sugar, the product is subject to two taxes.

French politicians have considered the obesity rate serious enough that they got local communities to govern their overweight and obesity levels through a program called Epode (acronym for "Ensemble, prévenons l'obésité des enfants", "Together let's prevent obesity in children"). Six years after the program has started, it has been considered a success with obesity rates lowered up to 25% in some communities. The cost of the program is €2 a day per child. Due to cultural issues brought in from immigration, there is no exact program format; though, a town implementing the program must offer a "menu Epode", which comprises dishes considered healthy.

== Statistics ==
According to the CIA's World Factbook, France's prevalence rate for adult obesity was 21.60% in 2016, placing the country at the 87th position worldwide. Among European countries, rates ranged from 19.50% (Switzerland) to 27.80% (United Kingdom).

== See also ==
- Health in France
- Epidemiology of obesity
- List of countries by Body Mass Index (BMI)
