= International rankings of France =

The following are International rankings of France.

== Cities ==
- gaWC Inventory of World Cities, 1999: Paris alpha world city

== Economic ==
- The Wall Street Journal and The Heritage Foundation: Index of Economic Freedom 2007, ranked 45 out of 157 countries
- International Monetary Fund: GDP (nominal) per capita 2006, out of 182 countries
- International Monetary Fund: GDP (nominal) 2006, ranked 5 out of 181 countries
- List of countries by GDP - official exchange rate 2019, ranked 8, out of 226 countries
- World Economic Forum: Global Competitiveness Index 2006–2007, ranked 18 out of 125 countries
- World Bank: Ease of Doing Business Index, ranked 31 out of 178 countries
- World Tourism Organization: World Tourism rankings 2008, ranked 1 in tourist arrivals
- Fortune Global 500 2010, with 39 worldwide corporations, France has the third largest number of wealthiest corporations out of 32 countries

== Environmental ==
- Yale University: Environmental Sustainability Index 2005, ranked 36 out of 146 countries
- New Economics Foundation: Happy Planet Index 2006, ranked 129 out of 178 countries

== Globalization ==
- KOF: Globalization Index 2007, ranked 6 out of 122 countries
- A.T. Kearney/Foreign Policy Magazine: Globalization Index 2006, ranked 23 out of 62 countries

== Military ==
- Ranked 5th by military expenditures out of 170 countries.
- CSIS: active troops, ranked 21st out of 166 countries

== Political ==
- Transparency International: Corruption Perceptions Index 2007, ranked 19 out of 179 countries
- Reporters Without Borders: Worldwide press freedom index 2007, ranked 31 out of 169 countries
- Economist Intelligence Unit: Democracy Index 2007, ranked 24 out of 167 countries
- Fund for Peace and Foreign Policy magazine: Failed States Index 2007, ranked 157 out of 177 countries

== Social ==
- Economist Intelligence Unit: Quality-of-life index 2005, ranked 25 out of 108 countries
- UN: Human Development Index 2007, ranked 8 out of 177 countries
- Population ranked 19 out of 221 countries

== Technological ==
- Economist Intelligence Unit e-readiness rankings 2007, ranked 22 out of 69 countries
- The World Factbook: number of Internet users, ranked 10 out of 80 countries
- World Intellectual Property Organization: Global Innovation Index 2026, ranked 13 out of 139 countries

== International rankings ==
Organization	Survey	Ranking
World Bank	Total GDP, 2009	5 out of 144
Institute for Economics and Peace	Global Peace Index	30 out of 144
Reporters Without Borders	Worldwide Press Freedom Index 2005	30 out of 167
Transparency International	Corruption Perceptions Index 2008	18 out of 163
United Nations Development Programme	Human Development Index ( 2009)	8 out of 182

== See also ==
- Lists of countries
- Lists by country
- List of international rankings
