= 1846 French legislative election =

← 1842	1 August 1846	1848 →
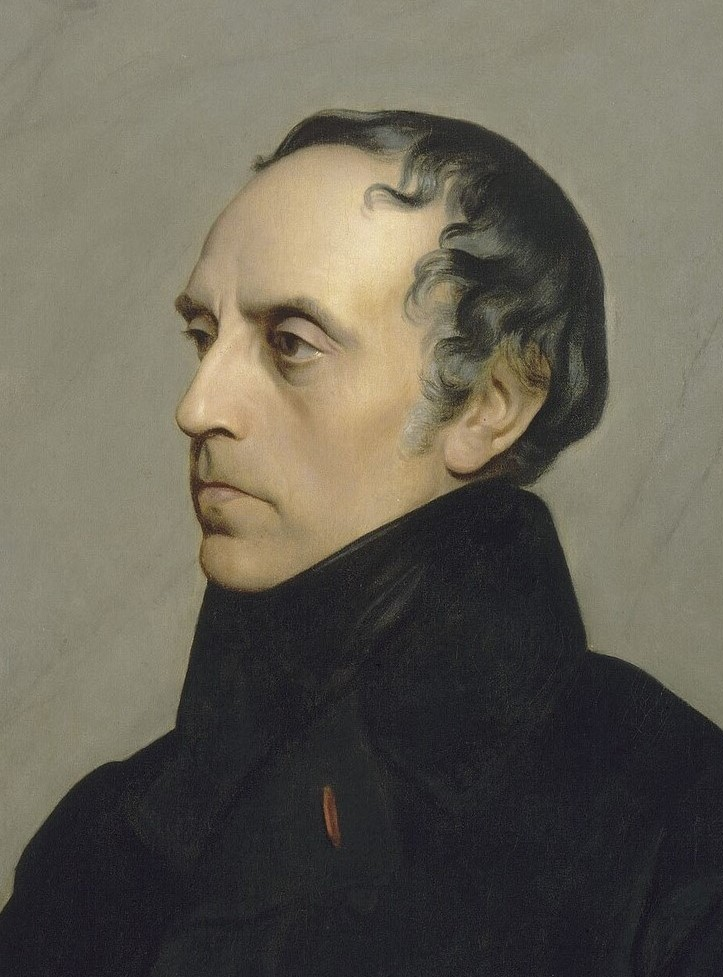

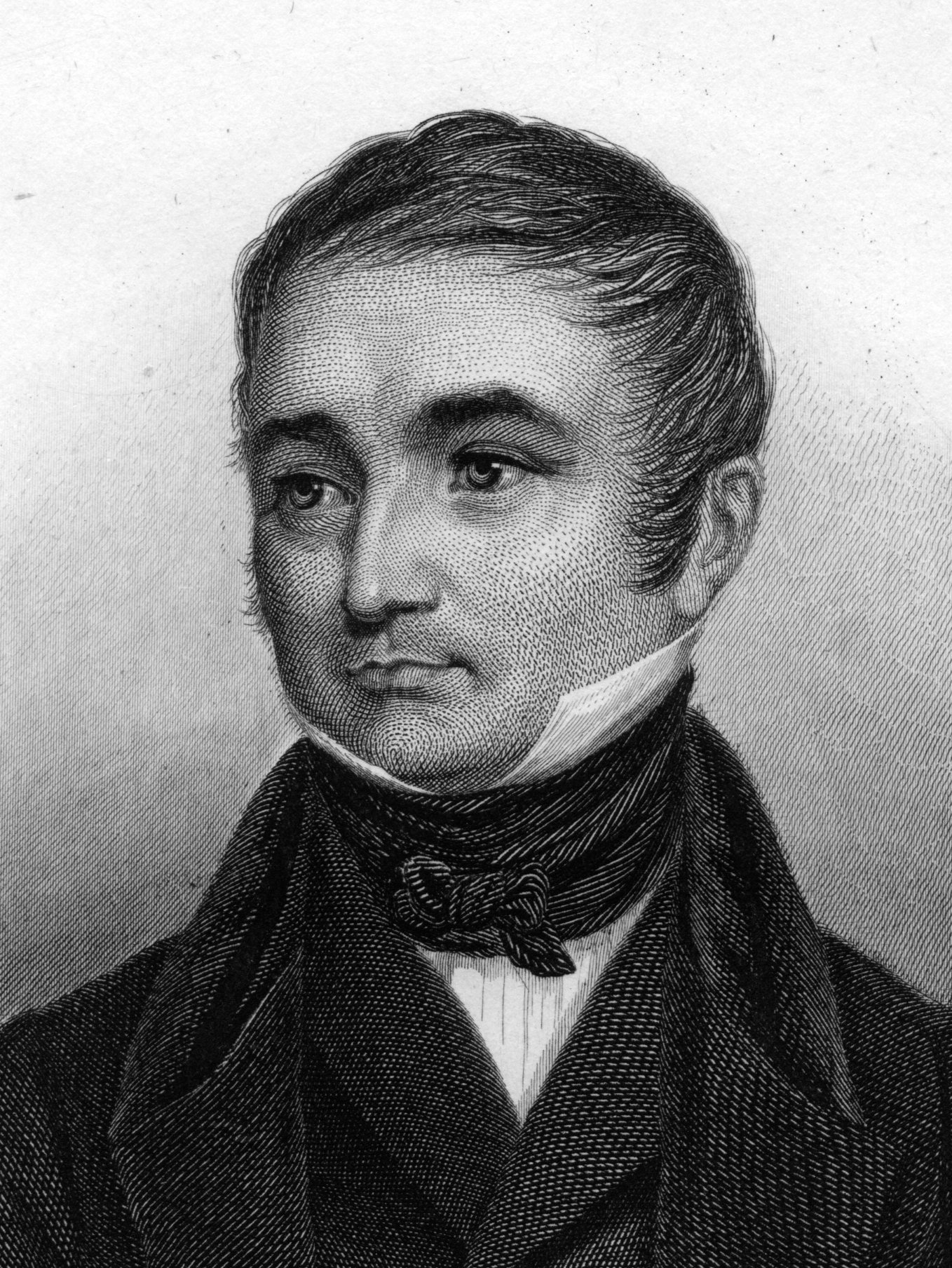
	First party	Second party
Leader	François Guizot	Adolphe Thiers
Party	Resistance Party	Movement Party
Seats won	290	168
Prime Minister before election
Jean-de-Dieu Soult
Resistance Party
Elected Prime Minister
Jean-de-Dieu Soult
Resistance Party

Legislative elections were held in France on 1 August 1846. Only citizens paying taxes were eligible to vote.

== Results ==
Party	Votes	%	Seats
Resistance Party			290
Movement Party			168
Total			458
Total votes	199,827	–	
Registered voters/turnout	240,983	82.92	
Source: Rois et Presidents, Sternberger et al.

== Aftermath ==
The legislature ended with the French Revolution of 1848.
