= 1815 French legislative election =

The 1815 French legislative election can refer to two separate elections. In May, an election was held under the Charter of 1815 under Napoleon Bonaparte's restored empire. A second election was held in August under the Bourbon Restoration government.

- May 1815 French legislative election
- August 1815 French legislative election
