= 1834 French legislative election =

- 21 June 1834
Party	Seats
Conservative ministerial	320
Opposition	75
Third Party	50
Legitimists	15
This lists parties that won seats. See the complete results below.
Prime Minister before	Prime Minister after
Jean-de-Dieu Soult; Resistance Party	Jean-de-Dieu Soult; Resistance Party

Legislative elections were held in France on 21 June. Only citizens paying taxes were eligible to vote.

== Results ==
Party	Votes	%	Seats
Conservative ministerial			320
Opposition			75
Third Party			50
Legitimists			15
Total			460
Total votes	129,211	–	
Registered voters/turnout	171,015	75.56	
Source: Roi et President

== Aftermath ==
Louis-Philippe of France dissolved the legislature on 3 October 1837.
