= Cabinet Dufaure I (France) =

54th cabinet of France

- 54th Cabinet of France

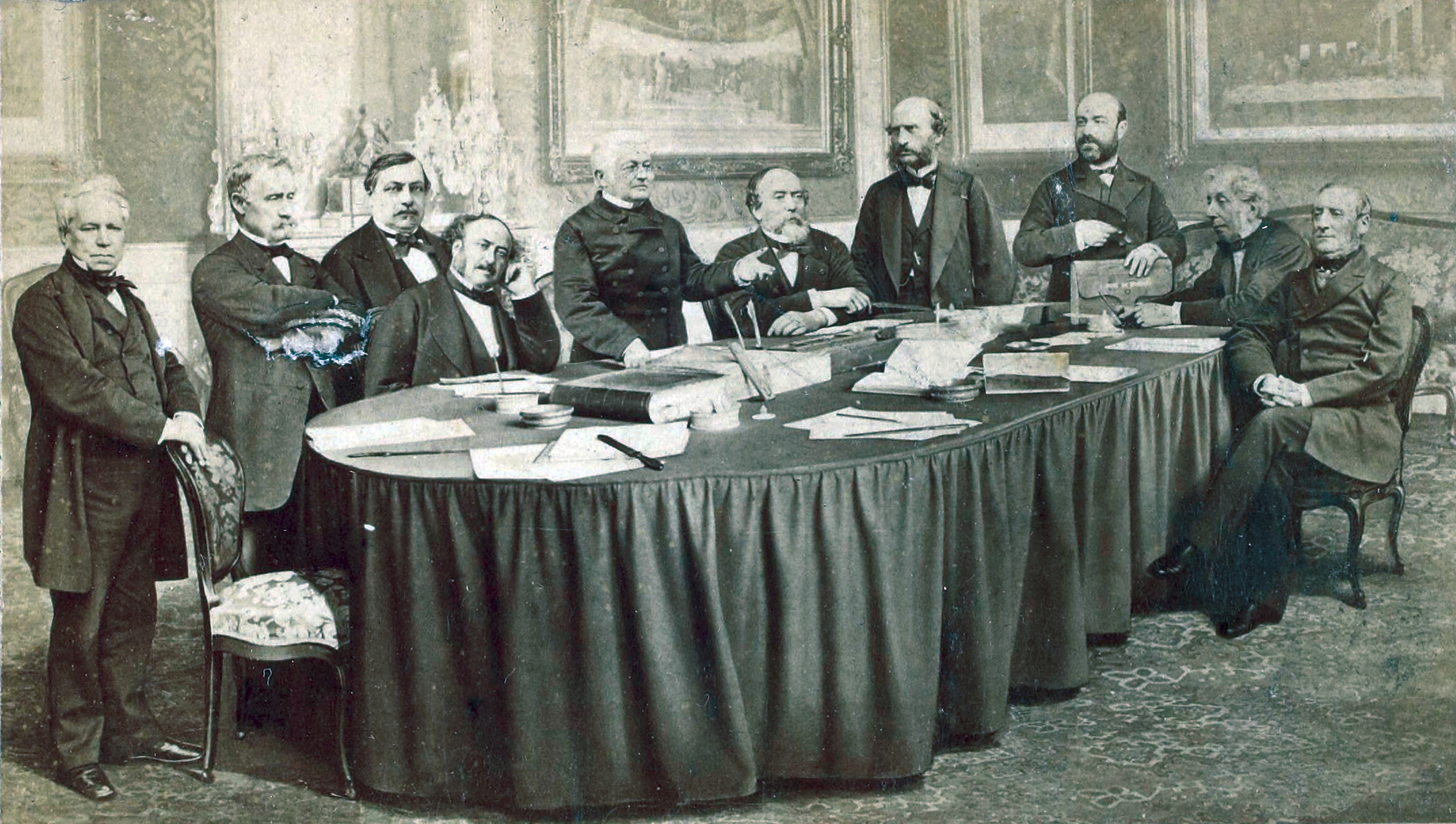
- The cabinet at the end of 1872.
- Date formed: 19 February 1871
- Date dissolved: 18 May 1873

People and organisations
- President (Note: Titled Chief of the Executive Power of the French Republic from 17 February 1871 to 31 August 1871.): Adolphe Thiers
- Head of government: Jules Dufaure
- Member parties: Opportunists; Legitimists; Orleanists; Liberals
- Status in legislature: Majority 580 / 638 (91%)
- Opposition parties: Bonapartists; Radicals

History
- Election: 1871 legislative election
- Predecessor: National Defence
- Successor: Dufaure II

The First cabinet of Jules Dufaure was the 54th cabinet of France and the second of the Third Republic, seating from 19 February 1871 to 18 May 1873, headed by Jules Dufaure as Vice-President of the Council of Ministers and Minister of Justice, under the presidency of Adolphe Thiers.

== History ==
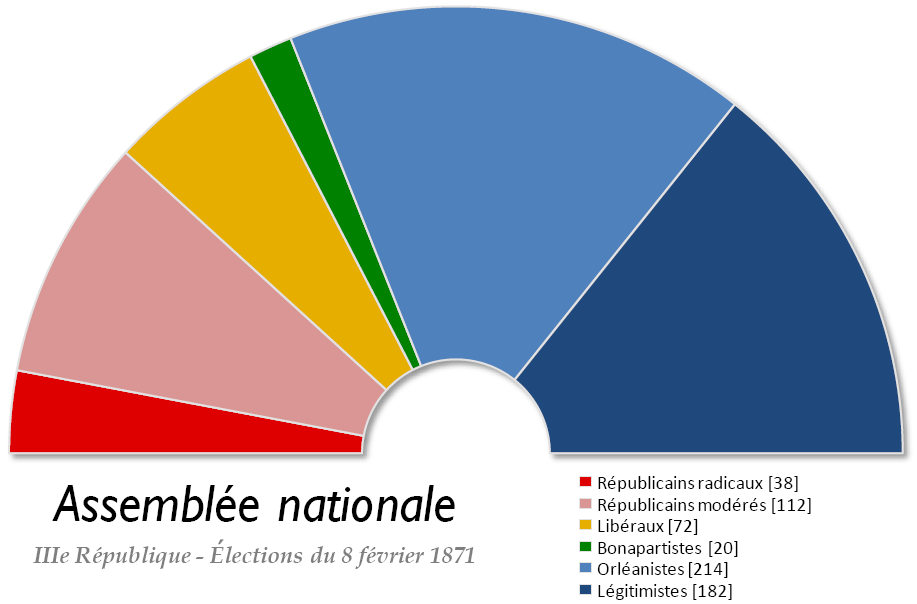
National Assembly following the elections of 8 February 1871.

The Government of National Defence, having led the republic during the Franco-Prussian War, signed the Armistice of Versailles which provided for new elections in the National Assembly to establish a more legitimate government.

The cabinet was formed following the Legislative elections of 1871, which saw a majority of royalists elected. Their initial project was a third Restoration of descendants of either the Bourbons or the Orléans; the Republic was merely seen at that time by royalists as a system of transition before the return of a constitutional monarchy.

However, Jules Dufaure succeeded in assembling a coalition of Opportunists, Legitimists, Orleanists and independent Liberals, while leaving Bonapartists, marginalized following the fall of the Second Empire, and Radicals, openly in favour of the pursuit of the war, out of the majority.

On 18 May 1873, Adolphe Thiers, wishing to reorganize the government and to make it more republican leaning, asked the cabinet to resign and tasked Jules Dufaure to form a new one, leading to the formation of the Cabinet Dufaure II.

== Actions ==
The main actions of the government were to deal with the Paris Commune and to end the Franco-Prussian War by conducting negotiations with Bismarck before signing the Treaty of Frankfurt and reducing the indemnity requested by Prussia to five billion francs.

It also supervised the reorganization of the French Army in order to provide it with manpower equivalent to that of the Prussian Army and to professionalize it, and finally dissolved the National Guard now seen as a major threat to the republic and the regular army.

== Composition ==
Vice-President of the Council of Ministers : Jules Dufaure
Portfolio (Note: Order of the list corresponds to the order of appointment.)	Name	Took office	Left office	Party	Ref.
Minister of Justice	Jules Dufaure	19 February 1871	18 May 1873	Opportunist Republicans	
Minister of Foreign Affairs	Jules Favre	19 February 1871	2 August 1871	Opportunist Republicans	
Minister of Foreign Affairs	Charles de Rémusat	2 August 1871	18 May 1873	Centre-right	
Minister of Interior	Ernest Picard	19 February 1871	5 June 1871	Centre-left	
Minister of Interior	Félix Lambrecht	5 June 1871	11 October 1871	Centre-left	
Minister of Interior	Auguste Casimir-Perier	11 October 1871	6 February 1872	Opportunist Republicans	
Minister of Interior	Victor Lefranc	6 February 1872	7 December 1872	Opportunist Republicans	
Minister of Interior	Eugène de Goulard	7 December 1872	18 May 1873	Orleanist	
Minister of War	Adolphe Le Flô	19 February 1871	5 June 1871	Orleanist	
Minister of War	Ernest de Cissey	5 June 1871	18 May 1873	Legitimist	
Minister of Navy and Colonies	Louis Pothuau	19 February 1871	18 May 1873	Centre-left	
Minister of Public Instruction	Jules Simon	19 February 1871	18 May 1873	Opportunist Republicans	
Minister of Agriculture	Félix Lambrecht	19 February 1871	5 June 1871	Centre-left	
Minister of Agriculture	Victor Lefranc	5 June 1871	6 February 1872	Opportunist Republicans	
Minister of Agriculture	Eugène de Goulard	6 February 1872	23 April 1872	Orleanist	
Minister of Agriculture	Pierre Teisserenc de Bort	23 April 1872	18 May 1873	Centre-left	
Minister of Public Works	Roger de Larcy	19 February 1871	7 December 1872	Legitimist	
Minister of Public Works	Oscar Bardi de Fourtou	7 December 1872	18 May 1873	Centre-right	
Minister of Finance	Louis Buffet	19 February 1871	25 February 1871	Centre-right	
Minister of Finance	Augustin Pouyer-Quertier	25 February 1871	23 April 1872	Centre-right	
Minister of Finance	Eugène de Goulard	23 April 1872	7 December 1872	Orleanist	
Minister of Finance	Léon Say	7 December 1872	18 May 1873	ALP	
Undersecretary of State for the Ministry of Interior	Marc-Antoine Calmon	23 February 1871	7 December 1872	Centre-left	
Undersecretary of State for the Ministry of Interior	Ernest Pascal	9 April 1873	18 May 1873	Bonapartist	
Undersecretary of State for the Ministry of War	Charles Letellier-Valazé	26 March 1873	18 May 1873	Centre-left	
