= Cabinet Dufaure II (France) =

- 55th Cabinet of France

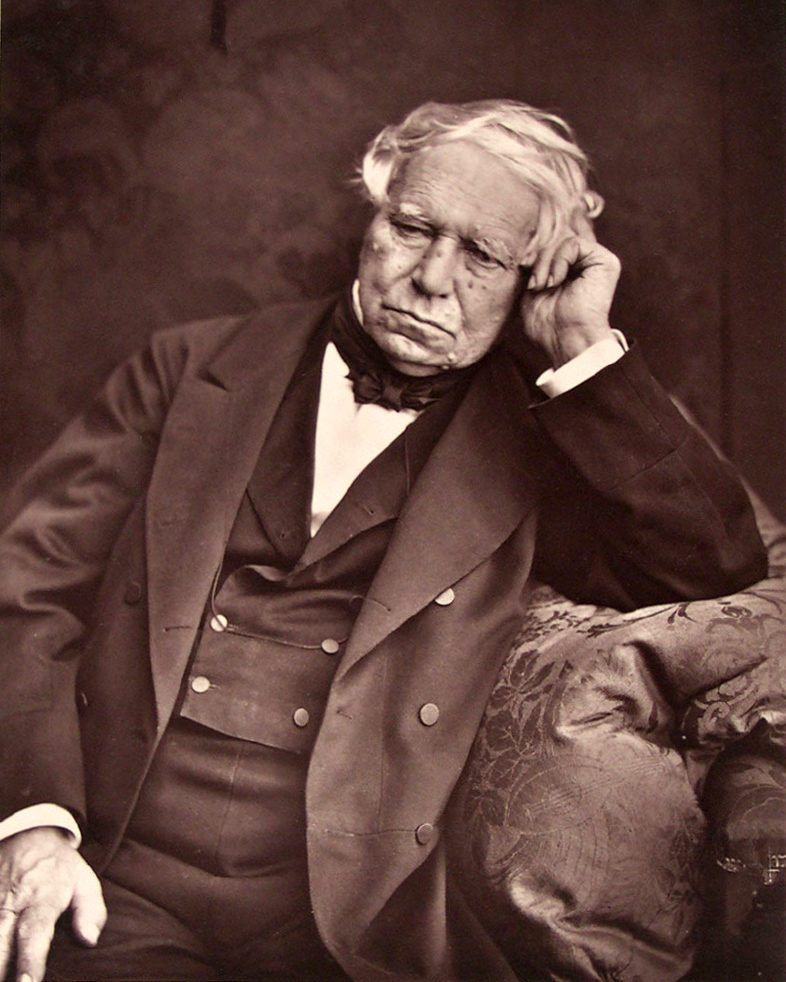
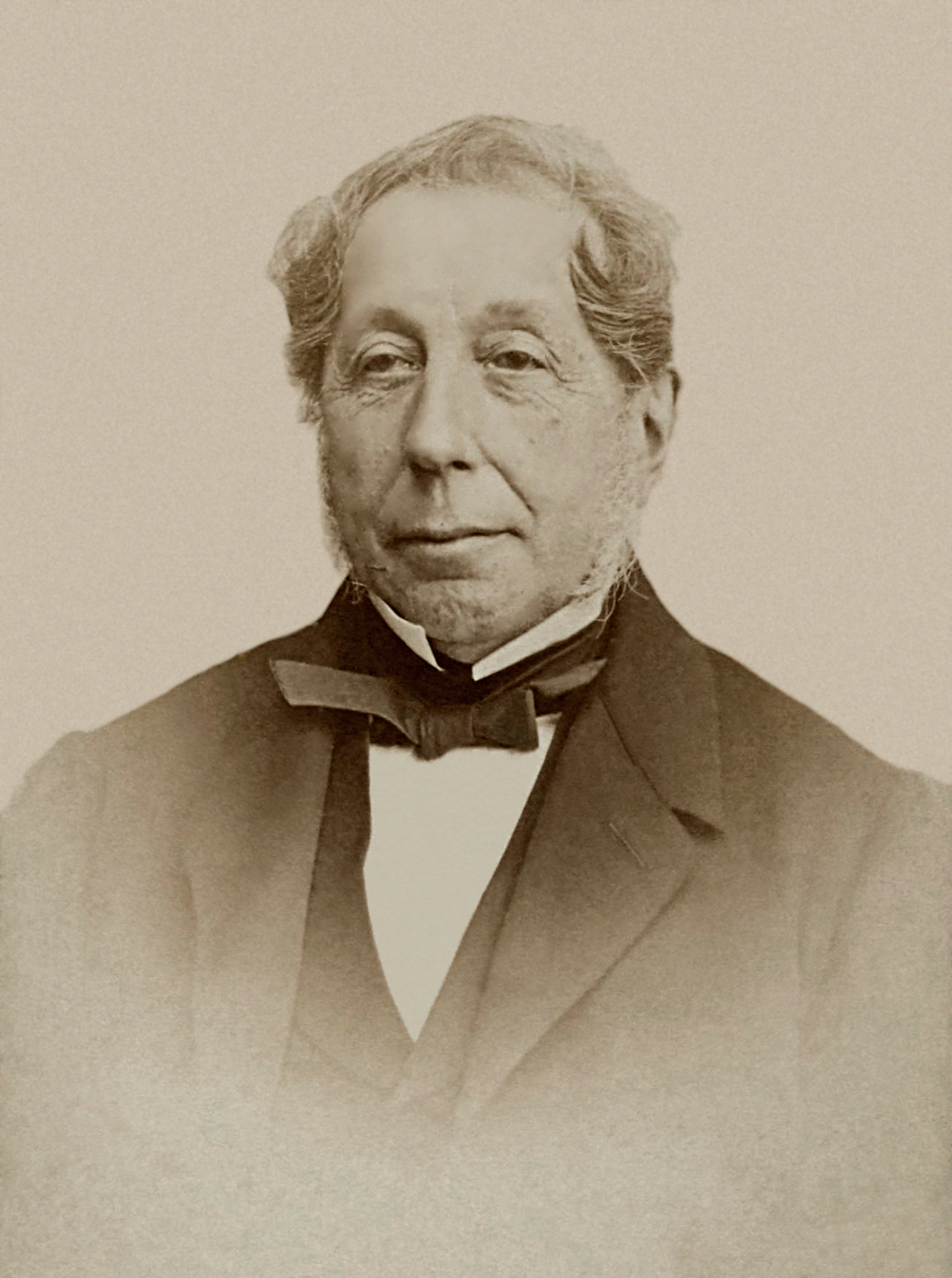
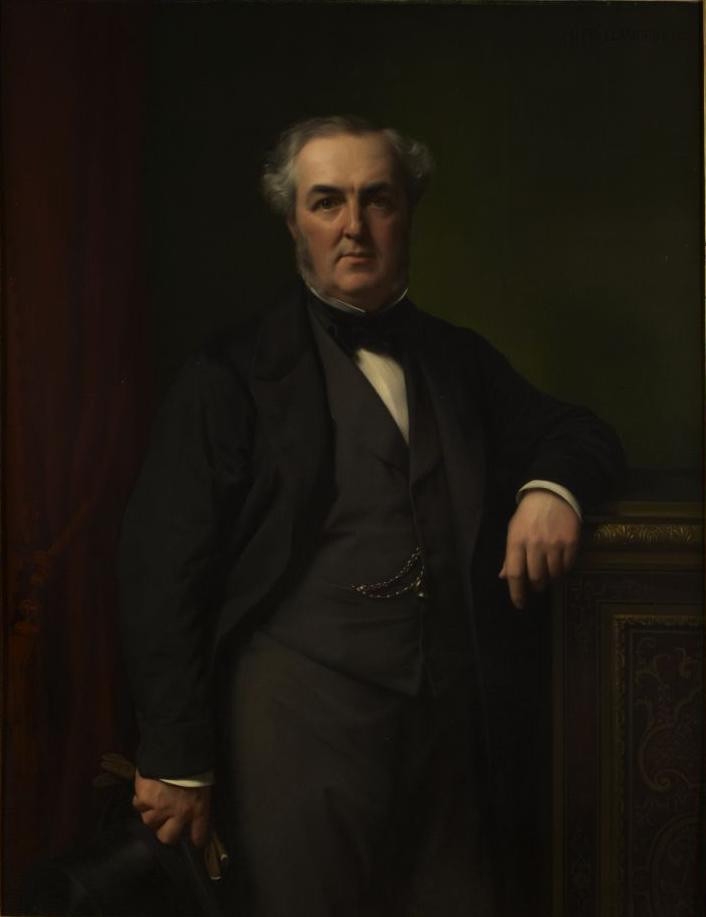
- Date formed: 18 May 1873
- Date dissolved: 25 May 1873

People and organisations
- President: Adolphe Thiers
- Head of government: Jules Dufaure
- Member parties: Opportunists; Liberals
- Status in legislature: Minority (Note: Complementary elections of 2 July 1871.) 285 / 759 (38%)
- Opposition parties: Legitimists; Orléanists; Bonapartists; Radicals

History
- Election: 1871 legislative election
- Predecessor: Dufaure I
- Successor: de Broglie I

The Second Cabinet of Jules Dufaure is the 55th cabinet of France and the third of the Third Republic, seating from 18 May 1873 to 25 May 1873, headed by Jules Dufaure as Vice-President of the Council of Ministers and Minister of Justice, under the presidency of Adolphe Thiers.

== History ==
Following the previous cabinet largely assembled by an agreement between royalists and moderate republicans that resulted in a coalition, Thiers asked Dufaure to reform a republican government without the support of the Legitimists and the Orléanists on 18 May 1873.

The goal was to pursue the reforms which Thiers had envisioned but that weren't previously possible; however, it placed the government in a minority in the National Assembly. Indeed, even after the complementary elections of 2 July 1871, which saw an increase of seats for the Opportunists and their Liberal allies, royalists still outnumbered them.

Most of the members of the preceding cabinet remained in office and only four new ministers were appointed. One particularity of the cabinet is the separation of the portfolio of Public Instruction and Worship into two distinct ministries, divisions which would be quickly erased during the following administrations.

Thiers and Dufaure presented to the Assembly a project on the organization of the powers for the republic. This project was meant to bring bicameralism, the responsibility of the government to the parliament and the right of dissolution in the political system of France.

On 24 May 1873 the vote on the project failed. A new vote, interpreted by Thiers as a vote of no confidence, was held in the National Assembly, carried out by the royalists now in opposition and in majority following their ousting of the previous government. It passed with a majority of sixteen and Adolphe Thiers resigned as a result. Jules Dufaure tendered the cabinet's resignation after only a week, making it one of the shortest cabinets of the Third Republic. The newly elected President of the Republic Patrice de MacMahon accepted it on 25 May and proceeded to ask Albert de Broglie to form a new government, leading to the formation of the much more conservative Cabinet de Broglie I.

== Composition ==
Vice-President of the Council of Ministers : Jules Dufaure
Portfolio (Note: Order of the list corresponds to the order of appointment.)	Name		Took office	Left office	Party	Ref.
Minister of Justice	Jules Dufaure	18 May 1873	25 May 1873		Opportunist Republicans	
Minister of Foreign Affairs	Charles de Rémusat	18 May 1873	25 May 1873		Centre-right	
Minister of Finance	Léon Say	18 May 1873	25 May 1873		ALP	
Minister of Agriculture	Pierre Teisserenc de Bort	18 May 1873	25 May 1873		Centre-left	
Minister of War	Ernest de Cissey	18 May 1873	25 May 1873		Legitimist	
Minister of Navy and Colonies	Louis Pothuau	18 May 1873	25 May 1873		Centre-left	
Minister of Interior	Auguste Casimir-Perier	18 May 1873	25 May 1873		Opportunist Republicans	
Minister of Worship	Oscar Bardi de Fourtou	18 May 1873	25 May 1873		Centre-right	
Minister of Public Works	René Bérenger	18 May 1873	25 May 1873		Centre-left	
Minister of Public Instruction	William Waddington	18 May 1873	25 May 1873		Centre-left	
