= Jules Armand Dufaure =

French statesman (1798–1881)

Jules Dufaure
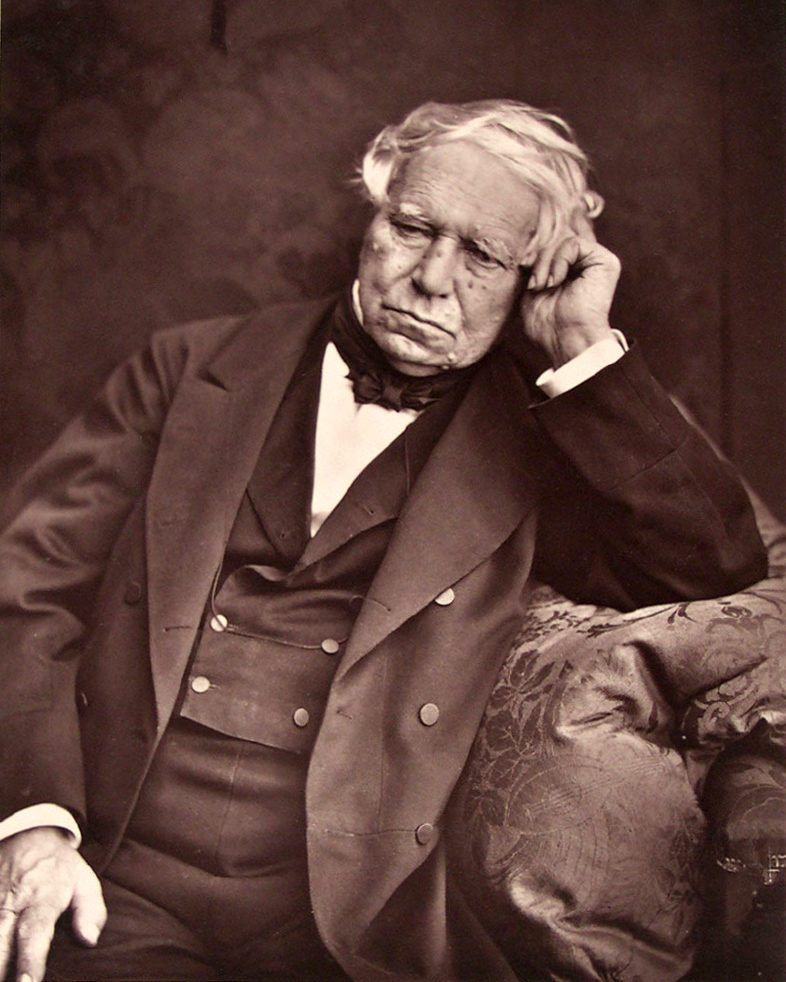
- Dufaure by Antoine Samuel Adam-Salomon, circa 1870s

Prime Minister of France
- In office 13 December 1877 – 4 February 1879
- President: Patrice de Mac-Mahon; Himself (acting); Jules Grevy
- Preceded by: Gaëtan de Rochebouët
- Succeeded by: William Waddington
- In office 23 February 1876 – 12 December 1876
- President: Patrice de Mac-Mahon
- Preceded by: Louis Buffet
- Succeeded by: Jules Simon
- In office 19 February 1871 – 24 May 1873
- President: Adolphe Thiers
- Preceded by: Louis Jules Trochu
- Succeeded by: Albert, duc de Broglie

Acting President of France
- In office 30 January 1879
- Prime Minister: Himself
- Preceded by: Patrice de Mac-Mahon
- Succeeded by: Jules Grevy

Personal details
- Born: Jules Armand Stanislas Dufaure; 4 December 1798 Saujon, Charente-Maritime, France
- Died: 28 June 1881 (aged 82) Rueil-Malmaison, France
- Party: Moderate Republicans
- Spouse: Claire Jaubert
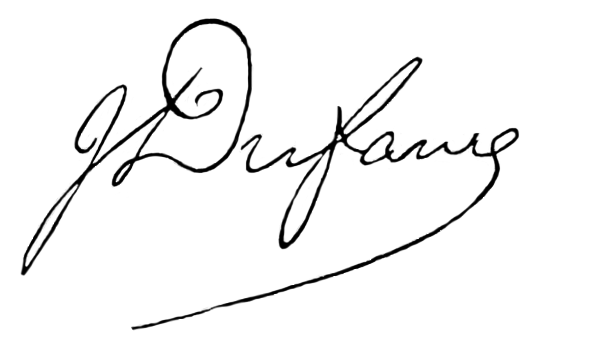
- Signature

Jules Armand Stanislas Dufaure (French: [ʒyl aʁmɑ̃ dyfoʁ]; 4 December 1798 – 28 June 1881) was a French statesman who served 3 non-consecutive terms as Prime Minister of France.

== Biography ==
Dufaure was born at Saujon, Charente-Maritime, and began his career as an advocate at Bordeaux, where he won a great reputation by his oratorical gifts. He abandoned law for politics and, in 1834, was elected deputy. In 1839, he became minister of public works in the ministry of Jean-de-Dieu Soult, and succeeded in freeing railway construction in France from the obstacles which until then had hampered it.

Losing office in 1840, Dufaure became one of the leaders of the Opposition, and on the outbreak of the revolution of 1848, he accepted the Republic and joined the party of moderate republicans. On 13 October, he became minister of the interior under Louis-Eugène Cavaignac, but retired on the latter's defeat in the presidential election. During the Second French Empire, Dufaure abstained from public life, and practised at the Paris bar with such success that he was elected bâtonnier in 1862.

In 1863, he succeeded to Étienne-Denis Pasquier's seat in the Académie Française. In 1871, he became a member of the Assembly, and proposed Adolphe Thiers as President of the Republic. Dufaure became the minister of justice as chief of the party of the "left-centre," and his tenure of office was distinguished by the passage of the jury-law. In 1873, he fell with Thiers, but in 1875 resumed his former post under Louis Buffet, whom he succeeded on 9 March 1876, the first to become president of the council (his predecessors wore the title of vice-presidents of the council). In the same year, he was elected a life senator. On 12 December, he withdrew from the ministry owing to the attacks of the republicans of the left in the chamber and of the conservatives in the senate.

After the conservatives' defeat on 16 May, he returned to power on 24 December 1877. Early in 1879, Dufaure took part in compelling the resignation of Patrice MacMahon, duc de Magenta, but immediately afterwards (1 February), worn out by opposition, he retired. As Prime Minister, he served as the Acting President of the Republic on 30 January 1879.

See G Picot, M. Dufaure, sa vie et ses discours (Paris, 1883).

== Dufaure's First Government, 19 February 1871 – 18 May 1873 ==
- Jules Dufaure – President of the Council and Minister of Justice
- Jules Favre – Minister of Foreign Affairs
- Adolphe Charles Le Flô – Minister of War
- Ernest Picard – Minister of the Interior
- Louis Buffet – Minister of Finance
- Louis Marie Alexis Pothuau – Minister of Marine and Colonies
- Jules Simon – Minister of Public Instruction, Fine Arts, and Worship
- Roger de Larcy – Minister of Public Works
- Félix Lambrecht – Minister of Agriculture and Commerce

Changes

- 25 February 1871 – Augustin Pouyer-Quertier succeeds Buffet as Minister of Finance.
- 5 June 1871 – Ernest Courtot de Cissey succeeds Le Flô as Minister of War. Félix Lambrecht succeeds Picard as Minister of the Interior. Victor Lefranc succeeds Lambrecht as Minister of Agriculture and Commerce.
- 2 August 1871 – The Comte de Rémusat, succeeds Favre as Minister of Foreign Affairs
- 11 October 1871 – Auguste Casimir-Perier succeeds Lambrecht as Minister of the Interior
- 6 February 1872 – Victor Lefranc succeeds Casimir-Perier as Minister of the Interior. Eugène de Goulard succeeds Lefranc as Minister of Agriculture and Commerce.
- 23 April 1872 – Eugène de Goulard succeeds Pouyer-Quertier as Minister of Finance. Pierre Teisserenc de Bort succeeds Goulard as Minister of Agriculture and Commerce.
- 7 December 1872 – Eugène de Goulard succeeds Lefranc as Minister of the Interior. Léon Say succeeds Goulard as Minister of Finance. Oscar Bardi de Fourtou succeeds Larcy as Minister of Public Works.

== Dufaure's Second Government, 18–25 May 1873 ==
- Jules Dufaure – President of the Council and Minister of Justice
- Comte de Rémusat – Minister of Foreign Affairs
- Ernest Courtot de Cissey – Minister of War
- Auguste Casimir-Perier – Minister of the Interior
- Léon Say – Minister of Finance
- Louis Marie Alexis Pothuau – Minister of Marine and Colonies
- William Henry Waddington – Minister of Public Instruction
- Oscar Bardi de Fourtou – Minister of Worship
- René Bérenger – Minister of Public Works
- Pierre Teisserenc de Bort – Minister of Agriculture and Commerce

== Dufaure's Third Government, 23 February – 9 March 1876 ==
- Jules Dufaure – President of the Council and Minister of the Interior and of Justice
- Louis Decazes – Minister of Foreign Affairs
- Ernest Courtot de Cissey – Minister of War
- Eugène Caillaux – Minister of Finance and Public Works
- Louis Raymond de Montaignac de Chauvance – Minister of Marine and Colonies
- Henri Wallon – Minister of Public Instruction, Fine Arts, and Worship
- Vicomte de Meaux – Minister of Agriculture and Commerce

== Dufaure's Fourth Government, 9 March – 12 December 1876 ==
- Jules Dufaure – President of the Council and Minister of Justice
- Louis Decazes – Minister of Foreign Affairs
- Ernest Courtot de Cissey – Minister of War
- Amable Ricard – Minister of the Interior
- Léon Say – Minister of Finance
- Martin Fourichon – Minister of Marine
- William Henry Waddington – Minister of Public Instruction
- Albert Christophle – Minister of Public Works
- Pierre Teisserenc de Bort – Minister of Agriculture and Commerce

Changes

- 11 May 1876 – Émile de Marcère succeeds Ricard as Minister of the Interior.
- 15 August 1876 – Jean Auguste Berthaud succeeds Courtot de Cissey as Minister of War.

== Dufaure's Fifth Government, 13 December 1877 – 4 February 1879 ==
- Jules Dufaure – President of the Council and Minister of Justice
- William Henry Waddington – Minister of Foreign Affairs
- Jean-Louis Borel – Minister of War
- Émile de Marcère – Minister of the Interior
- Léon Say – Minister of Finance
- Louis Marie Alexis Pothuau – Minister of Marine and Colonies
- Agénor Bardoux – Minister of Public Instruction, Fine Arts, and Worship
- Charles de Freycinet – Minister of Public Works
- Pierre Teisserenc de Bort – Minister of Agriculture and Commerce

Changes

- 16 May 1878 – Henri François Xavier Gresley succeeds Borel as Minister of War.

Political offices
Preceded by Jules Trochu	Prime Minister of France; 1871–1873	Succeeded by Duc de Broglie
Preceded by Adolphe Crémieux	Minister of Justice; 1871–1873	Succeeded by Jean Emoul
Preceded by Louis Buffet	Prime Minister of France; 1876	Succeeded by Jules Simon
Preceded by Gaëtan de Rochebouët	Prime Minister of France; 1877–1879	Succeeded by William Waddington
Preceded by François Le Pelletier	Minister of Justice; 1877–1879	Succeeded by Philippe Le Royer
