= French Republican Left (1871–1885) =

French parliamentary group of moderate republicans

Republican Left Gauche Républicaine
- President: Jules Grévy
- Founded: February 1871
- Dissolved: February 1882
- Merged into: Union démocratique
- Ideology: Republicanism
- Political position: Left-wing, later centre-left
- Legislatures: I, II, III of the Third Republic
- Legislative body: National Assembly (1871–1876)
- Legislative body: Chamber of Deputies (1876–1882)

The Gauche Républicaine (Republican Left) was a French parliamentary group, initially informal, originating from the republican opposition positioned on the left in the Corps législatif during the Second French Empire. It operated in the National Assembly elected in 1871 at the start of the Third Republic, and later in the Chamber of Deputies from 1876, before merging with the radicals of the Union républicaine to form the Union des gauches in 1885.

== Formation of the Gauche Républicaine ==
The group comprised "moderate" republicans with liberal leanings, also known as Opportunist Republicans. It positioned itself between the radical Extrême gauche led by Léon Gambetta and the Centre gauche associated with Adolphe Thiers. Its key leaders included Jules Grévy, Jules Ferry, who served as President of the Council in 1880–1881 and 1883–1885, and Jules Simon.

Following the Ordre moral government under Patrice de MacMahon, during the first true legislature of the Third Republic (1876–1877), the Gauche républicaine held the largest group in the Chamber with 193 deputies. However, it faced significant conflict with President Patrice de MacMahon, a monarchist elected by the previous Assembly. This tension culminated in the 16 May 1877 crisis, which led to the dissolution of the Chamber. The subsequent elections reaffirmed the republican majority, prompting MacMahon's resignation in 1879, allowing the moderates, led by Léon Gambetta, to dominate.

== Shift to the centre-right: the 1880s ==
With Jules Grévy ascending to the presidency, the Gauche républicaine became the dominant political force for the next two decades, supplying most ministers and senior officials. The term "gauche" (left) reflected the group's position in the hemicycle opposite the monarchists on the right, as well as the French political tendency known as sinistrisme. As the radicals, led by Georges Clemenceau, a fierce opponent of Jules Ferry, gained strength, the Gauche républicaine shifted toward the centre-right.

In February 1882, after the fall of Léon Gambetta's "Grand ministère," the group adopted the name Union démocratique. Its members supported all successive ministries until 1885, forming the "ministerial majority."

Following the 1885 legislative elections, the group merged with two other opportunist factions—the Union républicaine and the remaining members of the Centre gauche—to form the Union des gauches.

From a historical perspective, the Gauche républicaine of 1871 can be seen as a precursor to modern French parliamentary right-wing groups.

== Notable members ==
=== Leadership in the National Assembly and Chamber of Deputies ===
- Emmanuel Arago (steering committee, 1873)
- Jean-Baptiste Billot (steering committee, 1873)
- François Carquet (secretary, 1871)
- Hippolyte Carnot (steering committee until 1873)
- Sadi Carnot (secretary, 1871–1876)
- Adolphe Cochery (quaestor, 1877)
- Paul Devès (president, 1880)
- Philippe Devoucoux (steering committee, 1877; president, May 1877)
- Charles Duclerc (vice-president, 1874)
- Pascal Duprat (vice-president, 1877)
- Léopold Faye (quaestor, 1872)
- Jules Ferry (president, 1875; steering committee, 1877)
- Albert Grévy (secretary, 1871; president, 1872 and 1876; steering committee, 1873 and 1877)
- Victor Guichard (vice-president, 1880)
- Charles Guillemaut (steering committee, 1872)
- Gustave Humbert (president, 1871; steering committee, 1872)
- Léon Journault (secretary, 1877)
- Oscar de Lafayette (vice-president, 1871)
- Louis Laget (steering committee, 1872)
- Bernard Lavergne (steering committee, 1877; president, 1879)
- Désiré Médéric Le Blond (steering committee until 1873; president, 1877)
- Philippe Le Royer (steering committee, 1872; vice-president, then president, 1873)
- Henri Lévêque (secretary, 1872)
- Eugène Lisbonne (vice-president, 1877)
- Pierre Magnin (vice-president, 1872)
- François Malézieux (steering committee, 1872)
- Camille Margaine (quaestor, 1877)
- Frédéric Mestreau (steering committee until 1873)
- Charles Rolland (quaestor, 1872)
- Armand Rousseau (steering committee, 1872)
- Camille Sée (secretary, 1877)
- Jules Simon (vice-president, 1873; president, 1874)
- Henri Varroy (secretary, 1871)

=== Leadership in the Senate ===
- Emmanuel Arago (president from May 1877)
- Hippolyte Carnot (president, 1885)
- Jules Favre (steering committee, 1879)
- Ferdinand Hérold (quaestor, 1877)
- Désiré Médéric Le Blond (vice-president, 1879; president, 1880)
- Philippe Le Royer (vice-president, 1877; president, 1878)
- Pierre Magnin (president until May 1877)
- César Malens (secretary, 1877)
- Paul-Alexandre Robert de Massy (vice-president, 1879)
- Charles Mazeau (secretary, 1877)
- Hippolyte Ribière (president, 1884)
- Jules Simon (steering committee, 1879)

== See also ==
- French Third Republic
- Opportunist Republicans
- Radical Party (France)
- French Second Empire
- Sinistrisme

== Bibliography ==
- Claretie, Jules (1877). Histoire de la Révolution de 1870-71 [History of the Revolution of 1870–71] (in French). Paris: Librairie du Journal des débats. Archived from the original on November 28, 2022.
- Mayeur, Jean-Marie (1984). La vie politique sous la Troisième République: 1870-1940 [Political life under the Third Republic: 1870–1940] (in French). Paris: Editions du Seuil. p. 445. ISBN 9782020067775.
- Arnold, Edward J. (2000). The Development of the Radical Right in France. London: Palgrave Macmillan. ISBN 978-0333790373.
