= De Bort =

De Bort is a French surname. Notable people with the surname include:

- Léon Teisserenc de Bort (1855–1913), French meteorologist
- Pierre Edmond Teisserenc de Bort (1814–1892), French writer and politician
