= Louis-Amédée Humbert =

French politician (1814–1876)

Louis-Amédée Humbert (23 June 1814, Metz - 6 February 1876) was a French republican politician. He was a member of the National Assembly in 1871. He belonged to the Opportunist Republican parliamentary group, Gauche républicaine.
