= Eugène Flotard =

French politician

Eugène Flotard (21 March 1821 - 10 January 1910) was a French republican politician. Flotard was born in Saint-Étienne and was a member of the National Assembly from 1871 to 1876. He belonged to the Opportunist Republican parliamentary group, Gauche républicaine.
