= Édouard Bamberger =

French politician (1825–1910)

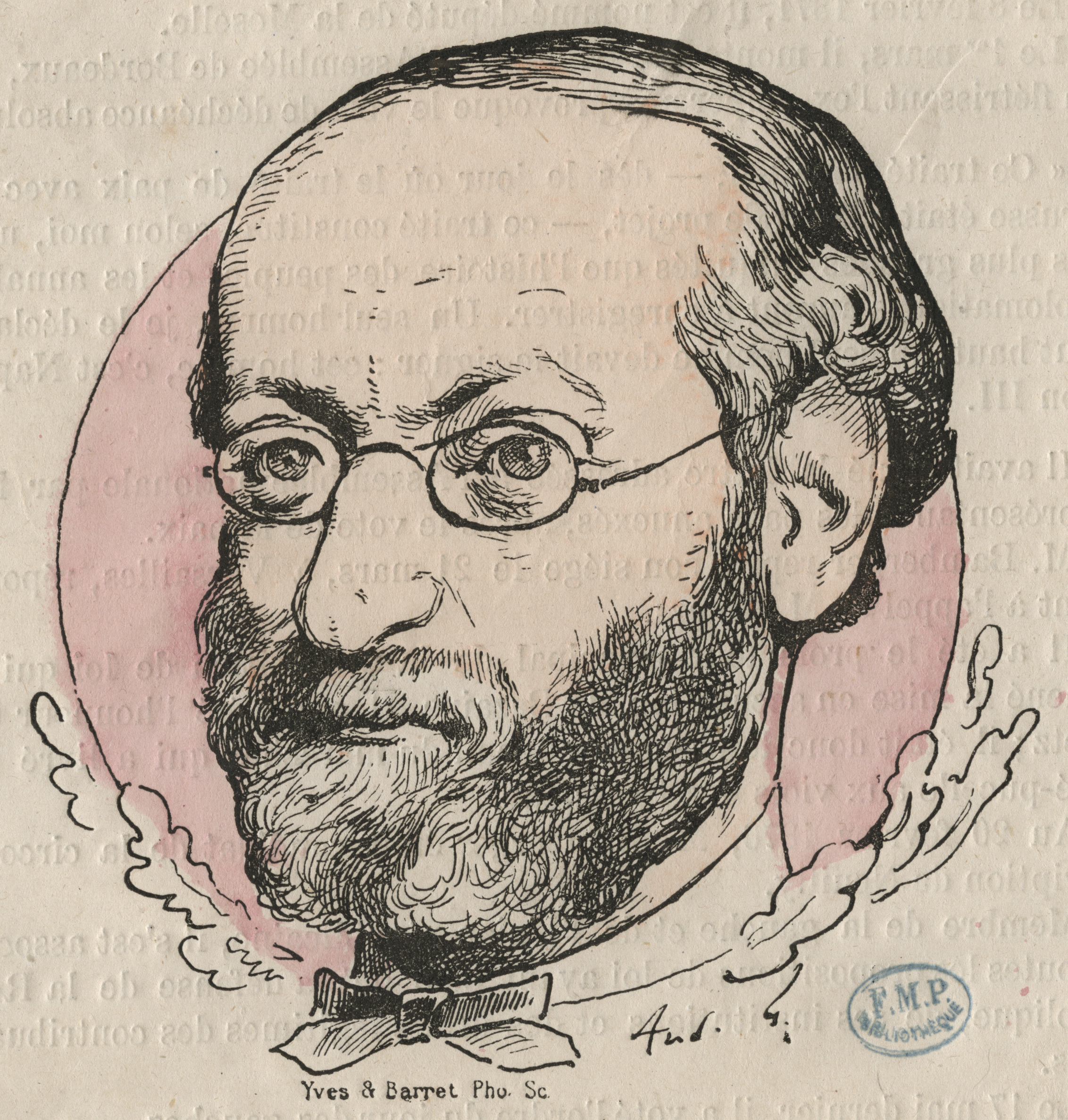

Édouard Bamberger (25 September 1825, Strasbourg – 8 July 1910) was a French republican politician. He was a member of the National Assembly from 1871 to 1876 and of the Chamber of Deputies from 1876 to 1881.
