= Eugène Caillaux =

French engineer and politician

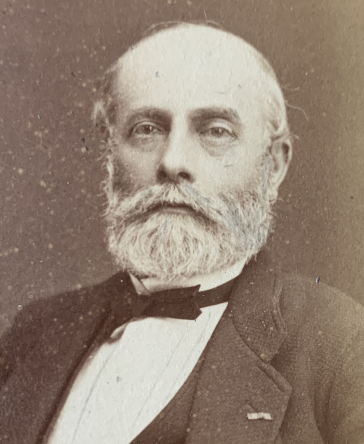

Personal details
- Born: 10 September 1822 Orléans, France
- Died: 8 August 1896 (aged 73) Paris, France

Eugène Alexandre Caillaux (French: [øʒɛn kajo]; 10 September 1822 – 8 August 1896) was a French engineer and politician. He was Minister of Public Works from 1874 until 1876, then Minister of Finance from May to November 1877. He was the father of the politician Joseph Caillaux.

== Biography ==
Born in Orléans, Caillaux studied at the École polytechnique (graduating 12 out of 118) and the École des ponts et chaussées before becoming an engineer, first in Laval, then in Le Mans. From 1862 to 1871 he was engineer-in-chief for the Compagnie des chemins de fer de l'Ouest.

In 1871, he was elected deputy for Sarthe. A monarchist, he was a member of the republican-conservative Target group which participated in the overthrow of Adolphe Thiers in 1873. A supporter of the Duke of Broglie's two governments, Caillaux entered government himself in May 1874, as Minister of Public Works in Ernest Courtot de Cissey's government, remaining in post until 1876 in Louis Buffet and Jules Dufaure's governments. As minister, he was a supporter of the railway companies and took a special interest in the improvement of the Loire basin.

Caillaux was elected a senator for Sarthe in January 1876, the last of three on the Union conservatrice list. from May to November 1877, he was Minister of Finance under Broglie. In 1882, he was defeated in the senatorial elections by the republicans, and abandoned national politics in favour of local politics in Sarthe.

Caillaux died in Paris in 1896 and was buried in the Père Lachaise Cemetery.

== Family ==
A son was Joseph Caillaux.

== Sources ==
- https://www2.assemblee-nationale.fr/sycomore/fiche/%28num_dept%29/1365
- https://www.senat.fr/senateur-3eme-republique/caillaux_eugene1249r3.html
- https://www.economie.gouv.fr/saef/eugene-caillaux
- https://archives.sarthe.fr/action-culturelle-et-educative/action-culturelle/jeudiarchives/histoire-du-departement/les-presidents-du-conseil-general-de-la-sarthe/eugene-caillaux-1822-1896
- https://www.appl-lachaise.net/caillaux-eugene-1822-1896/
