= Léon Say =

French statesman and diplomat (1826–1896)

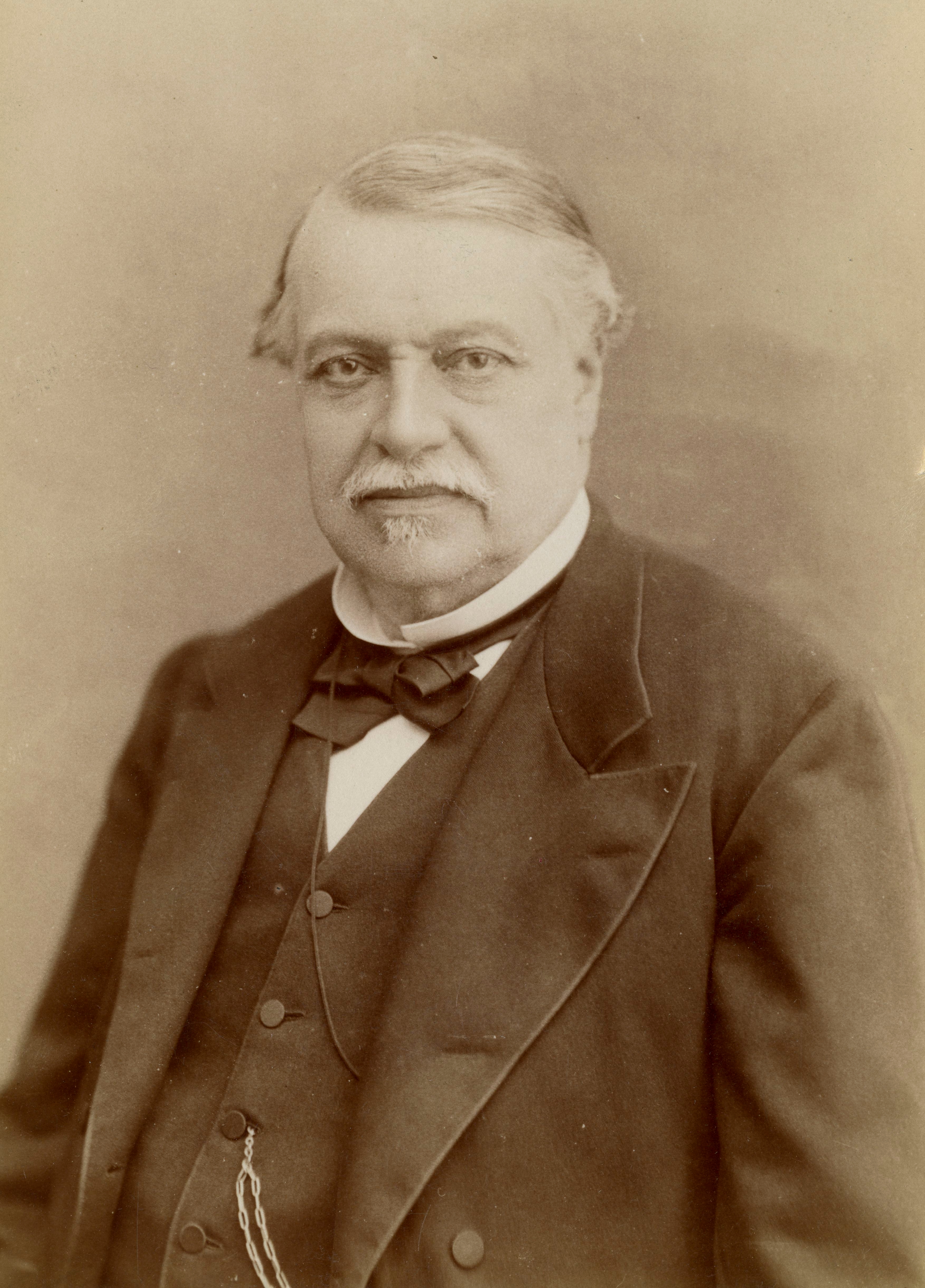
In 1893

Jean-Baptiste-Léon Say (6 June 1826, Paris – 21 April 1896, Paris) was a French banker, statesman and diplomat. One of the 19th-century's noted economists, he served as French Finance Minister from 1872 until 1883. He also served as an ambassador in London and with an interest in horticulture he presided over the National Horticultural Society of France.

== Biography ==
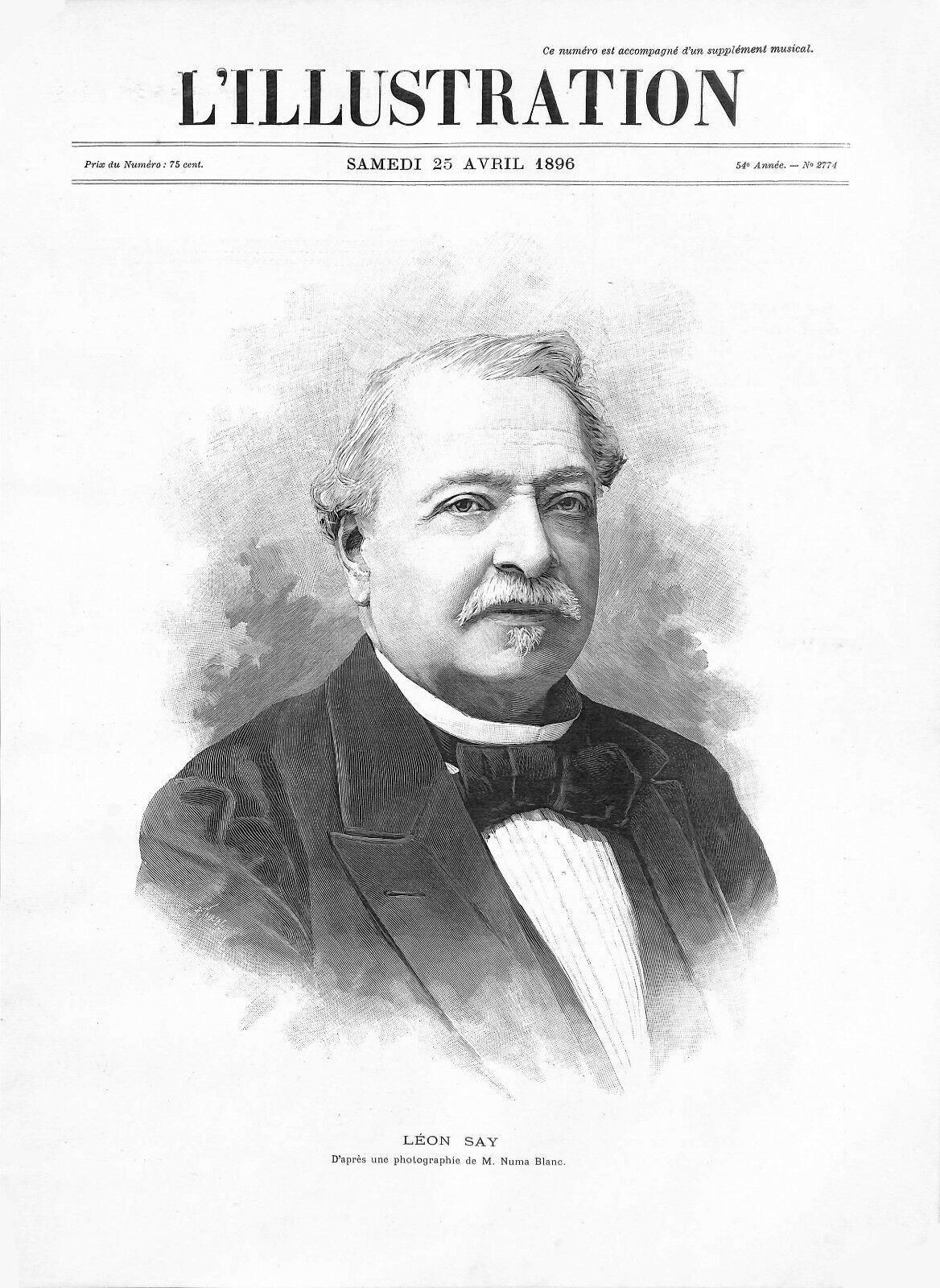
Léon Say on the cover of L'Illustration, 25 April 1896.

=== Say family ===
The Say family is a most remarkable one. His grandfather, Jean-Baptiste Say, was a well-known economist. His brother Louis-Auguste Say (1774–1840) was a director of a sugar refinery at Nantes who wrote several books on economics; his son, Horace-Émile Say (1794–1860), Léon Say's father, was educated at Geneva, before travelling in the United States. After returning to Paris, he then established himself in business later becoming President of Paris Chamber of Commerce in 1848; his acclaimed study of industrial conditions in Paris earned him a seat at the Academy of Moral and Political Sciences in 1857.

Léon Say was thus imbued with a zeal for economic study and theory, which first emerged at the age of twenty-two with his brief Histoire de la caisse descompte. Having initially been destined for the law, he became a banker and then was appointed as an executive for the Chemins de fer du Nord. Meanwhile, he was a regular contributor to the Journal des débats, growing his reputation through a series of brilliant attacks on the financial administration of Baron Haussmann, Prefect of the Seine.

He displayed a particular talent for engaging popular audiences in economic questions. His sympathies, like those of his grandfather, lay with the British economics school of thought, and he established a reputation as a proponent of free-trade principles for France. As a fluent English speaker, well acquainted with its customs and institutions, Say translated into French Goschen's Theory of Foreign Exchanges.

He was one of the pioneers of the co-operative movement in France. Elected to the Assembly of 1871 for the Departments of Seine and Seine-et-Oise, he adopted the former, taking his seat with the Moderate Liberals, whose principles he espoused throughout his life. He was immediately chosen as rapporteur to the parliamentary commission regarding the state of French national finances, and in this capacity he produced two elaborate statements. Thiers, though opposing their publication on grounds of public expediency, was much struck by the ability displayed in them, and on 5 June appointed Say as Prefect of the Seine.

The fall of the Empire, the siege of Paris, and the Commune had reduced the administration of the capital to chaos, and the task of reconstruction severely tried the prefecture's administration. This was, however, a gift to Say who was eminently suited to the task; he only quit this post to assume, in December 1872, the office of Minister of Finance — a remarkable tribute to his abilities from Thiers, who held strong protectionist views. In that same year, he was elected as a member to the American Philosophical Society.

In all other respects Say regarded himself as the disciple of Thiers, who, in his last public utterance, designated Say as one of the younger men who should carry on his work. He fell from office with Thiers on 24 May 1873 and became leader of the Centre-Left parliamentary group, having unsuccessfully contested the Presidency of the Chamber against Buffet. In spite of their divergent views, he consented, at the urgent request of Patrice de MacMahon, Duke of Magenta and President of France, to take office in March 1875 in the Buffet Cabinet; but the reactionary policy of the Prime Minister led to a dispute between him and Say both in the press and in parliament, leading to Buffet's resignation.

Say continued to hold the Finance ministerial brief under Dufaure and Jules Simon, and again in the Dufaure Government of December 1877, as well as in the succeeding Waddington Cabinet, until December 1879. During this long period, in which he became the undoubted doyen of French financial affairs; he first had to make repayment for the War Indemnity — a task which, owing largely to his consummate knowledge of foreign exchange markets, was effected long before the prescribed time. It was at a conference held between Say, Gambetta and Charles de Freycinet in 1878 that the great scheme of public works, introduced by the latter, was adopted as government policy.

Say's general financial outlook was to ameliorate the burden of taxation. In accordance with his free-trade market principles, he believed that the surest way of enriching the French nation, and therefore its Treasury, was to remove all restrictions on internal commerce. Accordingly, Say reduced the rate of postage, repealed duties on many basic utilities, such as paper, and fought strongly, though unsuccessfully, against the system of octrois.

On 30 April 1880 he accepted the post of Ambassador to London for the purpose of negotiating a commercial treaty between France and Britain, but the Presidency of the Senate having become vacant, he was elected to this office on 25 May, but not before securing an outline agreement with the British Government, an important feature of which was the reduction of duty on cheaper French wines.

In January 1882 he became Minister of Finance in the Freycinet Cabinet, which was defeated in the following July over the Egyptian question. Say's economic policies fell out of favour with the new generation of French politicians, since his academic Liberalism became regarded as old-fashioned; Socialism, which he never ceased to attack, obtained even greater power, and free-trade was discarded in favor of Félix Méline's protectionism, against which Say organized in vain the Ligue contre le renchérissement du pain. He had, however, a large share in the successful opposition to raising income tax, which he considered likely to discourage individual effort and thrift.

Léon Say's arms

In 1889 he resigned from the Senate to enter the Chamber as Deputy for Pau, in the belief that his efforts for Liberalism were more urgently needed in the National Assembly. Throughout his career he was indefatigable both as a writer and as a lecturer on economics, and in both capacities exerted a far wider influence than just in political circles.

Special mention must be made of his work, as editor and contributor, on the Dictionnaire des finances and Nouveau Dictionnaire d'économie politique. His style was easy and lucid, and he was often called upon for advice in drawing up important official documents, such as the famous presidential message of December 1877. He was for many years the most prominent member of the Académie des Sciences Morales et Politiques, and in 1886 was appointed to an Académie française seat, succeeding Edmond About.

Say died in Paris on 21 April 1896. A selection of his most important writings and speeches has since been published in four volumes under the title of Les Finances de la France sous la troisime république (1898 1901).

== Honours ==
- Grand-croix, Légion d'honneur

== See also ==
- Antoine Gustave Droz
- List of Ambassadors of France to the United Kingdom
- Famille Say

Political offices
Preceded by Eugène de Goulard	Minister of Finance; 1872–1873	Succeeded by Pierre Magne
Preceded by Pierre Mathieu-Bodet	Minister of Finance; 1875–1877	Succeeded by Eugène Caillaux
Preceded by François Dutilleul	Minister of Finance; 1877–1879	Succeeded by Pierre Magnin
Preceded by Louis Martel	President of the Senate; 1880–1882	Succeeded by Philippe Le Royer
Preceded by François Allain-Targé	Minister of Finance; 1882	Succeeded by Pierre Tirard
