= Jules Simon =

French statesman and philosopher (1814–1896)

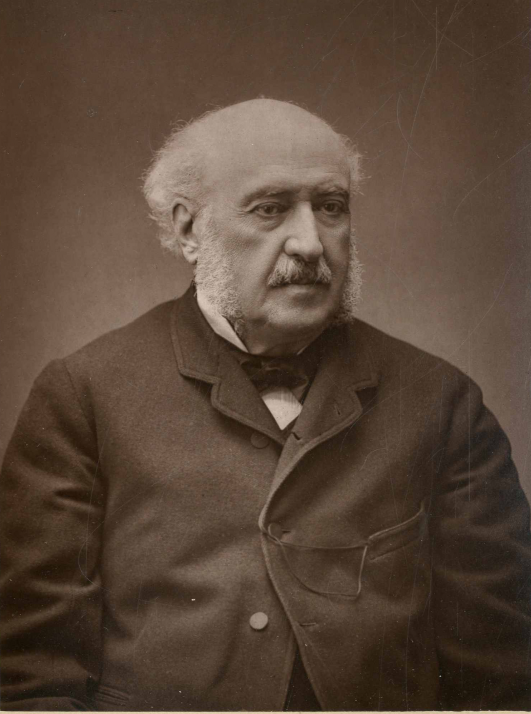

Prime Minister of France
- In office 12 December 1876 – 17 May 1877
- President: Patrice de MacMahon
- Preceded by: Jules Dufaure
- Succeeded by: Albert, duc de Broglie

Personal details
- Born: Jules François Simon; 31 December 1814 Lorient, France
- Died: 8 June 1896 (aged 81) Paris, France
- Party: Moderate Republican (1848–1871); Opportunist Republican (1871–1896)
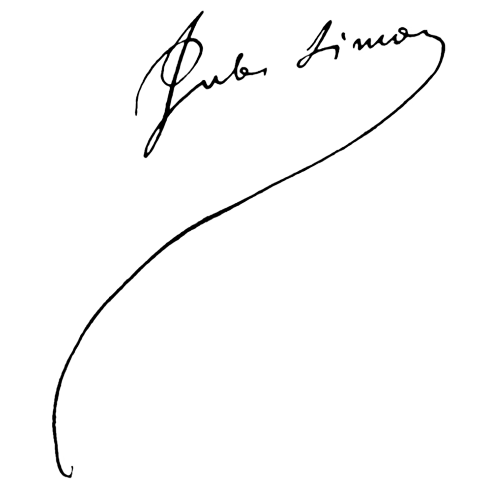
- Signature

Jules François Simon (French: [ʒyl simɔ̃]; 31 December 1814 – 8 June 1896) was a French statesman and philosopher, and one of the leaders of the Moderate Republicans in the Third French Republic.

Acclaimed during his lifetime by several intellectual circles, he was, according to Marc Angenot, a true 'intellectual mentor' for the 'bourgeois and petty-bourgeois masses' of the late 19th century.

== Biography ==
Simon was born at Lorient, Brittany. His father was a linen-draper from Lorraine, who renounced Protestantism before his second marriage with a Catholic Breton. Jules Simon was the son of this second marriage. The family name was Suisse, which Simon dropped in favour of his third forename. By considerable sacrifice he was enabled to attend a seminary at Vannes, and worked briefly as usher in a school before, in 1833, he became a student at the École Normale Supérieure in Paris (ENS Ulm). There he came in contact with Victor Cousin, who sent him to Caen and then to Versailles to teach philosophy. He helped Cousin, without receiving any recognition, in his translations from Plato and Aristotle, and in 1839 became his deputy in the chair of philosophy at the University of Paris, with the meagre salary of 83 francs per month. He also lectured on the history of philosophy at the École Normale Supérieure.

At this period he edited the works of Nicolas Malebranche (2 vols, 1842), of René Descartes (1842), Bossuet (1842) and of Antoine Arnauld (1843), and in 1844–1845 appeared the two volumes of his Histoire de l'école d'Alexandrie. He became a regular contributor to the Revue des deux mondes, and in 1847, with Amédée Jacques and Émile Saisset, founded the Liberté de penser, with the intention of throwing off the yoke of Cousin, but he retired when Jacques allowed the insertion of an article advocating the principles of collectivism, with which he was at no time in sympathy.

== Political career from 1848 to 1871 ==
In 1848 he represented the Côtes-du-Nord in the National Assembly, and next year entered the Council of State, but was retired on account of his republican opinions. His refusal to take the oath of allegiance to the government of Louis Napoleon after the coup d'état was followed by his dismissal from his professorship, and he devoted himself to philosophical and political writings of a popular order. Le Devoir (1853), which was translated into modern Greek and Swedish, was followed by La Religion naturelle (1856, Eng. trans., 1887), La Liberté de conscience (1857), La Liberté politique (1859), La Liberté civile (1859), L'Ouvrière (1861), L'Ecole (1864), Le Travail (1866), L'Ouvrier de huit ans (1867) and others.

In 1863 he was returned to the Corps Législatif for the 8th circonscription of the Seine département, and supported "les Cinq" (Darimon, Favre, Hénon, Ollivier and Picard) in their opposition to the government. He became minister of instruction in the Government of National Defense on 5 September 1870. After the capitulation of Paris in January 1871 he was sent down to Bordeaux to prevent the resistance of Léon Gambetta to the peace. But at Bordeaux, Gambetta, who had issued a proclamation excluding from the elections those who had been officials under the Empire, was all-powerful. Pretending to dispute Jules Simon's credentials, he issued orders for his arrest. Meanwhile, Simon had found means of communication with Paris, and on 6 February was reinforced by Eugène Pelletan, E. Arago and Garnier-Pages. Gambetta resigned, and the ministry of the Interior, though nominally given to Arago, was really in Simon's hands.

== Third Republic ==
Defeated in the département of the Seine, he sat for the Marne in the National Assembly, and resumed the portfolio of Education in the first cabinet of Adolphe Thiers's presidency. He advocated free primary education yet sought to conciliate the clergy by all the means in his power; but no concessions removed the hostility of Dupanloup, who presided over the commission appointed to consider his draft of an elementary education bill. The reforms he was actually able to carry out were concerned with secondary education. He encouraged the study of living languages, and limited the attention given to the making of Latin verse; he also encouraged independent methods at the École Normale, and set up a school at Rome where members of the French school of Athens should spend some time.

He retained office until a week before the fall of Thiers in 1873. He was regarded by the monarchical right as one of the most dangerous obstacles in the way of a restoration, which he did as much as any man (except perhaps the comte de Chambord himself) to prevent, but by the extreme left he was distrusted for his moderate views, and Gambetta never forgave his victory at Bordeaux. In 1875, he became a member of the Académie Française and a life senator, and in 1876, on the resignation of Jules Dufaure, was summoned to form a cabinet. He replaced anti-republican functionaries in the civil service by republicans, and held his own until 3 May 1877, when he adopted a motion carried by a large majority in the Chamber inviting the cabinet to use all means for the repression of clerical agitation.

His clerical enemies then induced Marshal MacMahon to take advantage of a vote on the press law carried in Jules Simon's absence from the Chamber to write him a letter regretting that he no longer preserved his influence in the Chamber, and thus practically demanding his resignation. His resignation in response to this act of the president, known as the "Seize Mai", which he might have resisted by an appeal to the Chamber, proved his ruin, and he never again held office. He justified his action by his fear of providing an opportunity for a coup d'état on the part of the Marshal. However, the May 1877 crisis eventually ended in MacMahon's demise and in the victory of the Republicans over the monarchist Orleanists and Legitimists.

The rejection (1880) of article 7 of Ferry's Education Act, by which the profession of teaching would have been forbidden to members of non-authorized congregations, was due to his intervention. He was in fact one of the chief of the left centre Opportunist Republicans faction, opposed in the same faction to Jules Grévy and also to the Radical Gambetta. He was director of Le Gaulois from 1879 to 1881, and his influence in the country among moderate republicans was retained by his articles in Le Matin from 1882 onwards, in the Journal des Débats, which he joined in 1886, and in Le Temps from 1890.

== Works ==
His own accounts of some of the events in which he had been involved appear in Souvenirs du 4 septembre (1874), Le Gouvernement de M. Thiers (2 vols., 1878), in Mémoires des autres (1889), Nouveaux mémoires des autres (1891) and Les Derniers mémoires des autres (1897), while his sketch of Victor Cousin (1887) was a further contribution to contemporary history. For his personal history, the Premiers mémoires (1900) and Le Soir de ma journée (1902), edited by his son Gustave Simon, may be supplemented by Léon Séché's Figures bretonnes, Jules Simon, sa vie, son œuvre (new ed., 1898), and Georges Picot, Jules Simon: notice historique (1897); also by many references to periodical literature and collected essays in Hugo Paul Thieme's Guide bibliographique de la littérature française de 1800 à 1906 (1907).

== Simon's Ministry, 12 December 1876 – 17 May 1877 ==
- Jules Simon – President of the Council and Minister of the Interior
- Louis Decazes – Minister of Foreign Affairs
- Jean Auguste Berthaud – Minister of War
- Léon Say – Minister of Finance
- Louis Martel – Minister of Justice and Worship
- Martin Fourichon – Minister of Marine and Colonies
- William Henry Waddington – Minister of Public Instruction
- Albert Christophle – Minister of Public Works
- Pierre Teisserenc de Bort – Minister of Agriculture and Commerce

Political offices
Preceded by Jules Dufaure	Prime Minister of France; 1876–1877	Succeeded by Duc de Broglie
