= Philippe Le Royer =

French and Swiss politician

Philippe Élie Le Royer was a French and Swiss politician from the 19th century, who served as the president of the French Senate and as the minister of Justice.

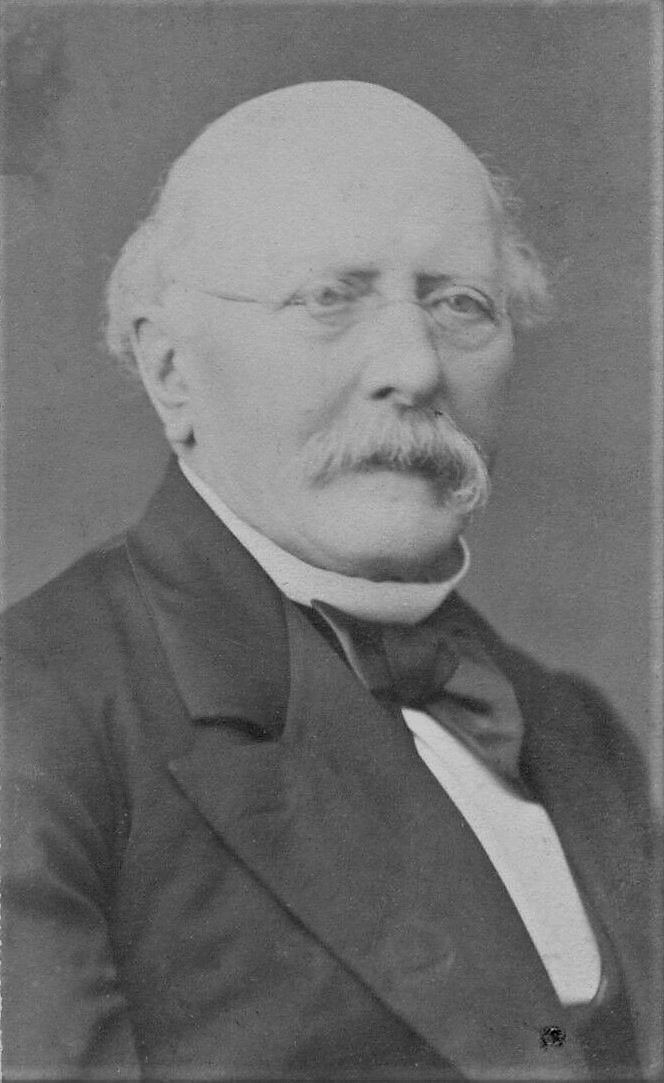
Portrait of Philippe Le Royer

== Early life ==
Philippe Le Royer was born in Geneva, Switzerland in 1816 to a notable Swiss and French family. His ancestors were peers of La Rochelle in the 14th century and subsequently printers to the King of France in the 16th century. Following edict of Nantes, his family became established as a bourgeois family of Geneva, Switzerland. The family held seats on the Council of Two Hundred, and were the proprietors of a renowned pharmacy. His father, Charles Le Royer was the captain of the garrison of the city of Geneva. Philippe Le Royer studied law in Paris, and became a lawyer based in Paris, Lyon and Chalon-sur-Saône.

== Career ==
He became advocate General of Lyon, where he repressed severe riots following the Franco Prussian War in 1870. During this time, he administered a policy against arbitrary detention of key personalities from the Second French Empire. Following this, became elected as a representative of the National Assembly of 1871, representing the French Left. He served in the Senate of France from 1875 until his death and was its president (1882–1893). He served as minister of justice (1878–1879) in the Government of France under Prime Minister William Henry Waddington, during which he oversaw the case of amnesty for the Paris Commune. He died in Paris in 1897, and is now buried at the Père Lachaise Cemetery.

== Bibliography ==
- "Philippe Le Royer", in Adolphe Robert and Gaston Cougny, Dictionnaire des parlementaires français (1789-1891), Bourloton, Paris, 1889 Edition details Wikisource
- Dictionnaire des Parlementaires français, Jean Jolly.

Political offices
Preceded by Jules Dufaure	Minister of Justice; 1878–1879	Succeeded by Jules Cazot
Preceded by Léon Say	President of the French Senate; 1882–1893	Succeeded by Jules Ferry
