= Louis Buffet =

French statesman (1818–1898)

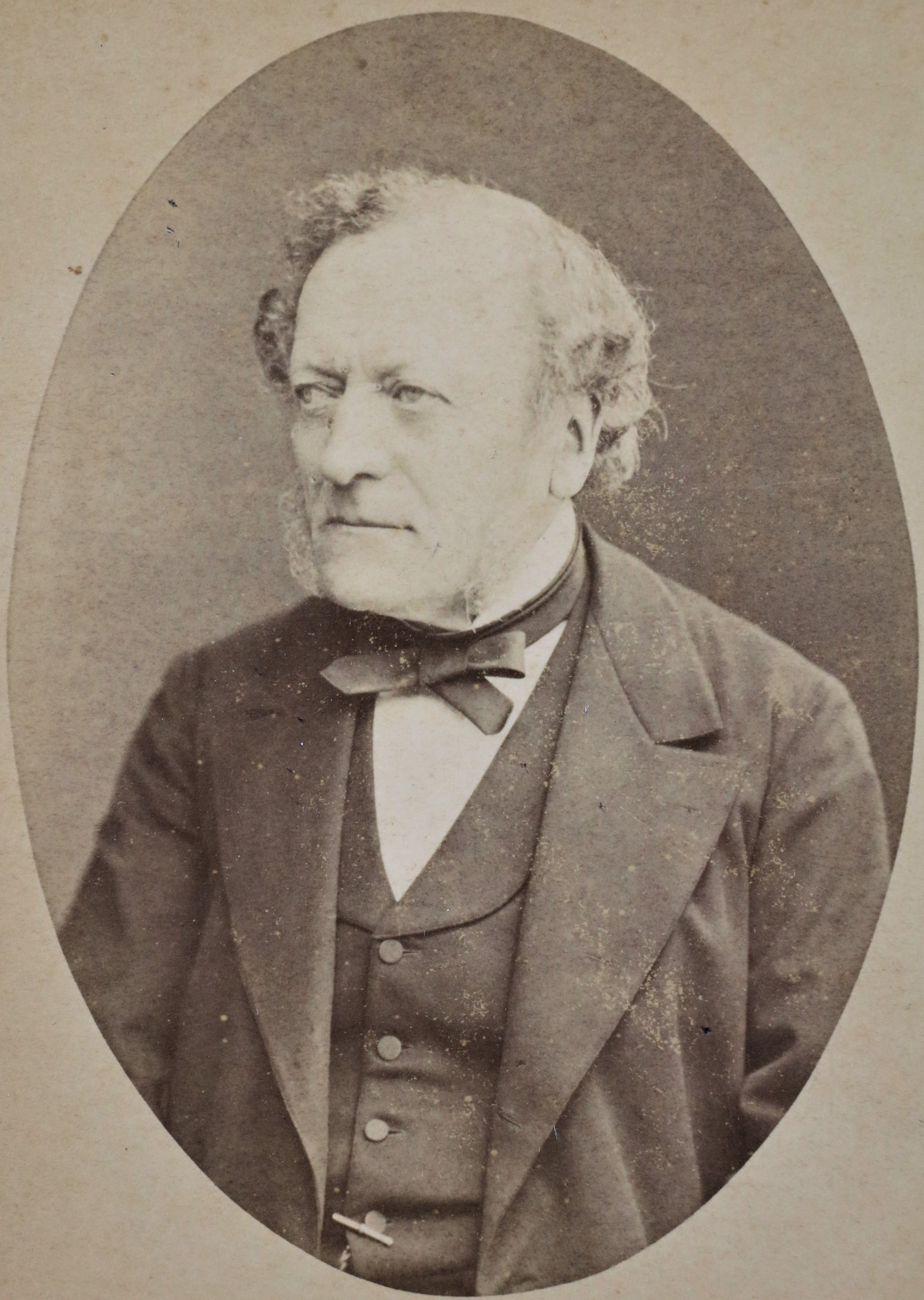

Prime Minister of France
- In office 10 March 1875 – 23 February 1876
- President: Patrice de MacMahon
- Preceded by: Ernest Courtot de Cissey
- Succeeded by: Jules Dufaure

Personal details
- Born: 26 October 1818 Mirecourt
- Died: 7 July 1898 (aged 79) Paris
- Party: None

Louis Joseph Buffet (French: [lwi byfɛ]; 26 October 1818 – 7 July 1898) was a French statesman.

He was born at Mirecourt, Vosges. After the revolution of February 1848 he was elected deputy for the department of the Vosges, and in the Assembly sat on the right, pronouncing for the repression of the insurrection of June 1848 and for Louis Napoleon Bonaparte. He was minister of agriculture from August to December 1849 and from August to October 1851.

Re-elected deputy in 1863, he was one of the supporters of the "Liberal Empire" of Émile Ollivier, and was finance minister in Ollivier's cabinet from January to 10 April 1870. He was president of the National Assembly from 4 April 1872 to 10 March 1875, minister of the interior in 1875, and Prime Minister of France from 1875 to 1876. Having made himself obnoxious to the Republican party, he failed to secure a reëlection to the Assembly in 1876. Then, elected senator for life (1876), he pronounced himself in favour of President MacMahon's failed attempt to seize political control on 16 May 1877.

Buffet had some oratorical talent, but shone most in opposition.

== Buffet's Ministry, 10 March 1875 – 22 February 1876 ==
- Louis Joseph Buffet – President of the Council and Minister of the Interior
- Louis Decazes – Minister of Foreign Affairs
- Ernest Courtot de Cissey – Minister of War
- Léon Say – Minister of Finance
- Jules Armand Dufaure – Minister of Justice
- Louis Raymond de Montaignac de Chauvance – Minister of Marine and Colonies
- Henri-Alexandre Wallon – Minister of Public Instruction, Fine Arts, and Worship
- Eugène Caillaux – Minister of Public Works
- Vicomte de Meaux – Minister of Agriculture and Commerce

Political offices
Preceded by Ernest Courtot de Cissey	Prime Minister of France; 1875–1876	Succeeded by Jules Dufaure
