= Jean Auguste Berthaut =

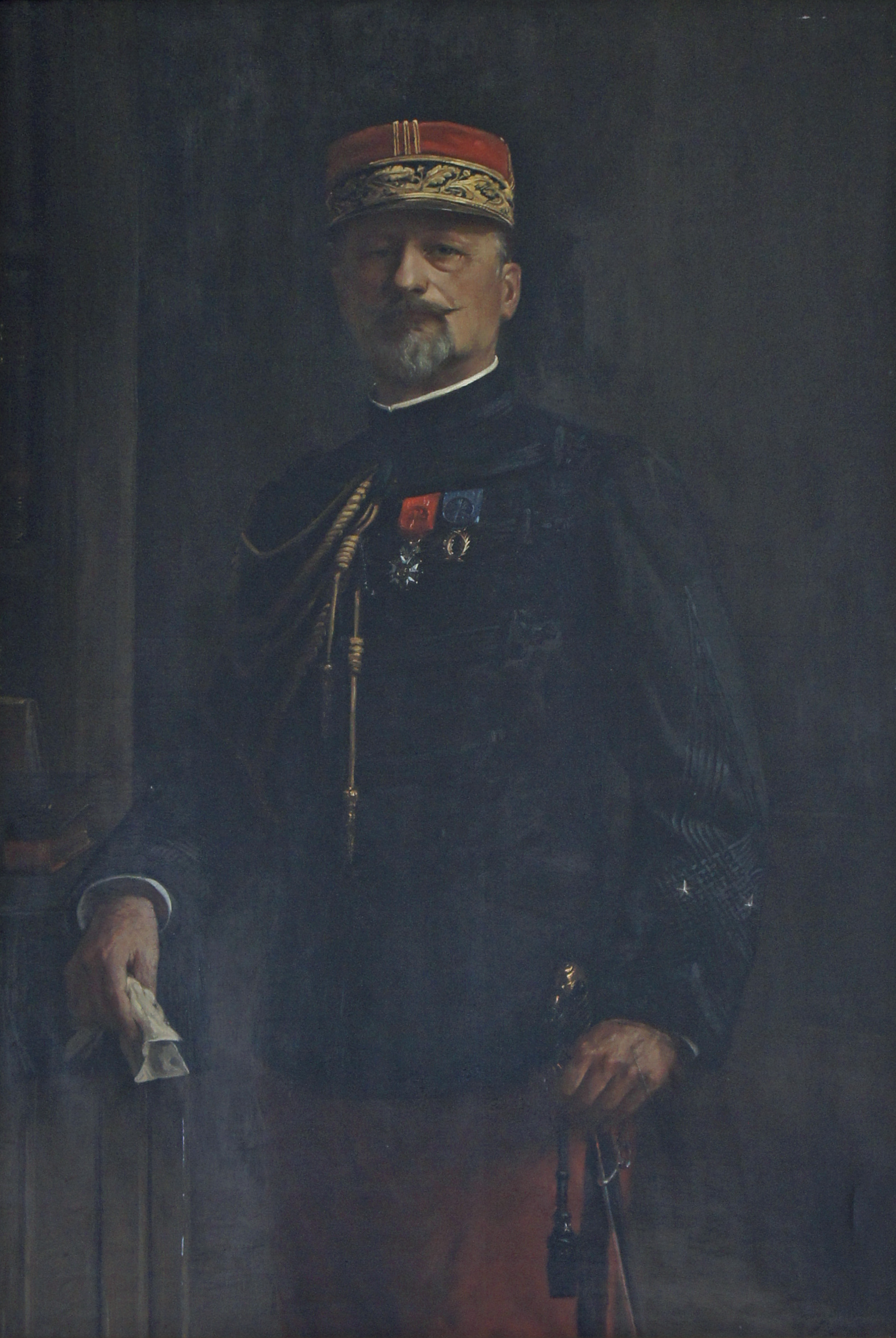
Jean Auguste Berthaut

Jean Auguste Berthaut (French: [ʒɑ̃ oɡyst bɛʁto]; 29 March 1817 – 24 December 1881) was a French soldier and politician.

He graduated from Saint Cyr in 1837. He was promoted to Brigadier general July 1870.

He commanded the National Guard in Paris in 1870. He fought at the Battle of Le Bourget, Champagny, and Battle of Buzenval. He was appointed Minister of War, in the government of Jules Dufaure. He was appointed commander of the 18th Army Corps. He was a grand officer of the Legion of Honor.

Political offices
Preceded by Ernest Courtot de Cissey	Minister of War; 15 August 1876 – 23 November 1877	Succeeded by Gaétan de Grimaudet de Rochebouët
