= Victor Lefranc =

French lawyer and politician

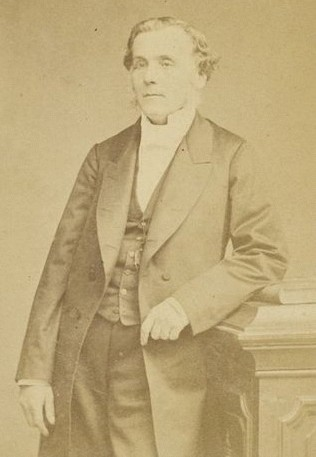
Victor Lefranc

Bernard Edme Victor Etienne Lefranc (3 February 1809 – 12 September 1883), French lawyer and politician, moderate republican, was under the French Third Republic Minister of Agriculture and Trade, then Interior Minister.

== Life ==
Victor Lefranc was born at Garlin (Pyrénées-Atlantiques). He studied in law and became lawyer.

Moderated republican, he opposed Louis-Philippe. After the revolution of February 1848, he was elected as deputy in the constituent Assembly. The Coup d'état stopped his public life in 1851. During the Second Empire, he was famous at the Parisian bar. He failed in 1863 and in 1869 elections in the Landes against the official candidate of the second Empire.

After the revolution of September 4, 1870, Victor Lefranc was elected at the French National Assembly. He was the rapporteur of the commission which entrusts to Thiers the executive power, then of the commission charged to reopen the negotiations with Prussia for peace.

Victor Lefranc was named Minister of Agriculture and Trade on June 9, 1871, in the government of Jules Armand Dufaure. He negotiated in London with the ministry Gladstone the revision of the bilateral commercial treaties.

Victor Lefranc became Interior Minister on February 6, 1872. He restricted some liberties. On November 30, 1872, the monarchist majority voted against the policy of the Interior Minister, who gave his resignation at once.

He became unremovable senator in 1881, and died in Saint-Sever, September 12, 1883.

== Deputy ==
- April 25, 1848: deputy of the Landes to the constituent Assembly
- May 13, 1849: deputy of the Landes to the Legislative Parliament
- February 8, 1871: deputy of the Landes to the French National Assembly
- February 20, 1876: deputy of the Landes to the French National Assembly
- May 21, 1881: unremovable senator

== Minister ==
- Minister of Agriculture and the trade (June 9, 1871 - February 6, 1872)
- Minister of Interior Department (February 6, 1872 - November 30, 1872)
