= Louis Pierre Alexis Pothuau =

French naval officer and politician

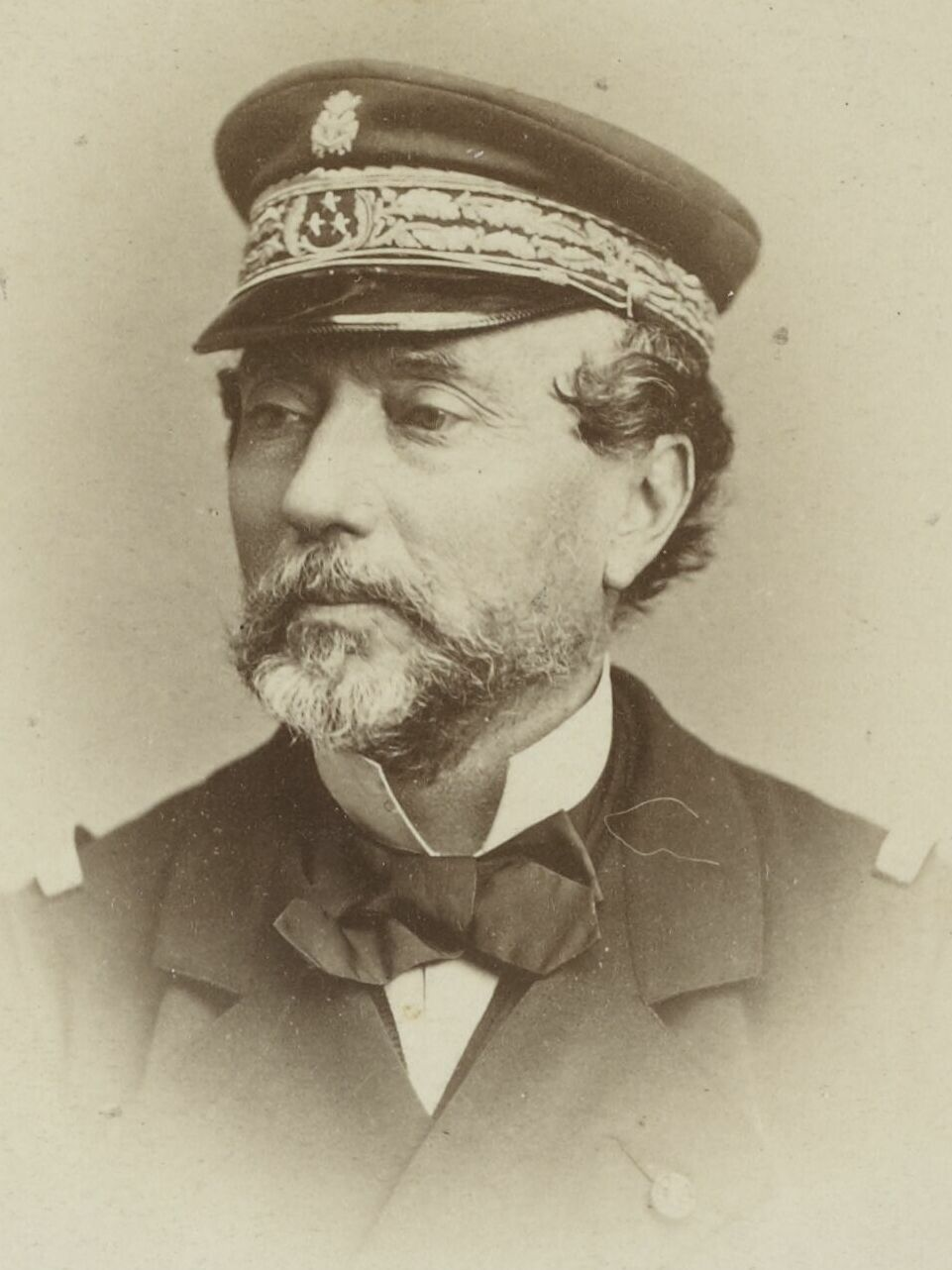

Louis Pierre Alexis Pothuau (28 October 1815, Paris – 7 October 1882) was a French naval officer and politician. He served as deputy for Paris, then as a sénateur inamovible. He was twice Minister for the Navy and the Colonies and ended his career as France's ambassador to the United Kingdom.

== Life ==
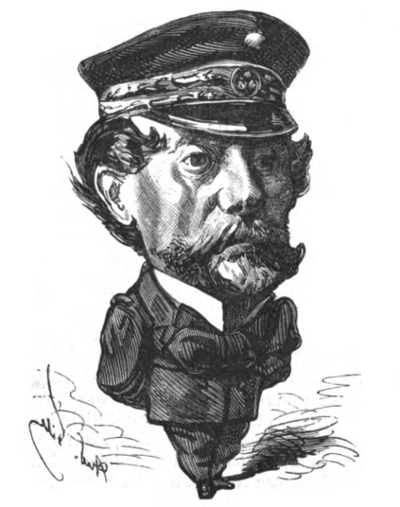
Admiral Pothuau by André Gill – 1873, from Le Trombinoscope of Touchatout.

His family originated on Martinique. He left he naval school in 1832 and (under the prince de Joinville's command) took part in the bombardment of Mogador in 1844, then in the bombardment of Odessa and the siege of Sebastopol.

He was made contre-amiral in 1864 and during the siege of Paris in 1870 commanded the forts in the south of the city, then headed a division in the battle at Gare-aux-Bœufs. He was promoted to vice-admiral and elected deputy for Paris in the national assembly. He joined the Centre gauche parliamentary group and entered the first ministry formed by Thiers as minister for the navy and the colonies (19 February 1871 – 25 May 1873). He was made a sénateur inamovible in 1875 and sided with the opposition during the 16 May 1877 crisis. Due to this he was re-appointed as naval minister in Dufaure's ministry (13 December 1877 – 4 February 1879). Finally he became ambassador to London between 1878 and 1880. On 12 October 1882 he was buried in the 14th division of cimetière du Père-Lachaise. In 1893 a cruiser named after him was launched.
