= Ernest Courtot de Cissey =

French general and Prime Minister (1810–1882)

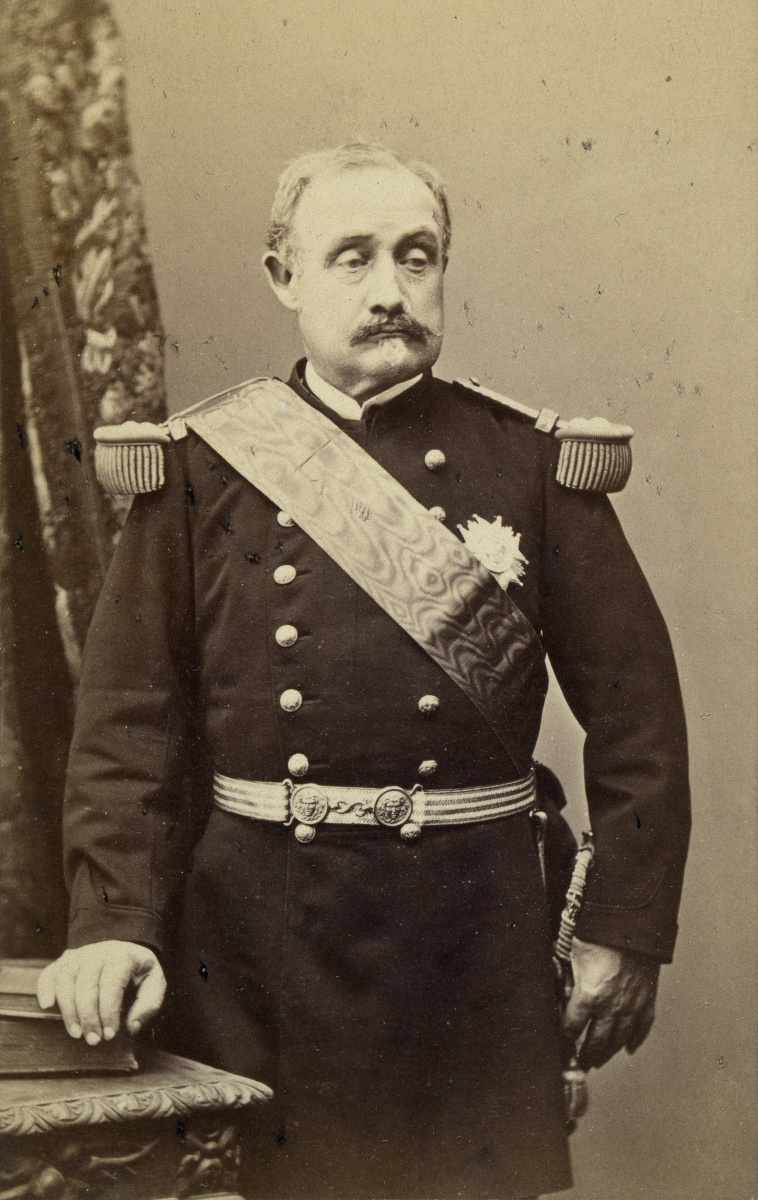

Prime Minister of France
- In office 22 May 1874 – 10 March 1875
- President: Patrice de MacMahon
- Preceded by: Albert, duc de Broglie
- Succeeded by: Louis Buffet

Personal details
- Born: 12 September 1810 Paris, French Imperial
- Died: 15 June 1882 (aged 71) Paris, Third Republic of France
- Party: None
- Spouse: Marie-Anne Rigodit
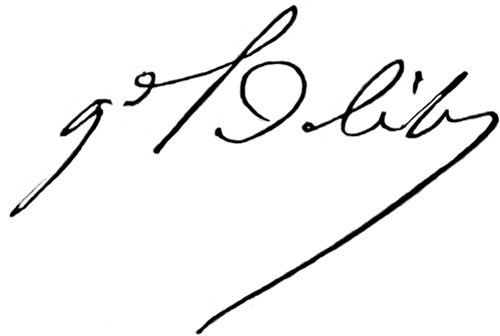
- Signature

Ernest Louis Octave Courtot de Cissey (French: [ɛʁnɛst lwi ɔktav kuʁto də sisɛ]; 1810–1882) was a French general and Prime Minister.

== Biography ==
Ernest Courtot de Cissey was born in Paris, educated at the Prytanée National Militaire and, after passing through St Cyr, entered the army in 1832, becoming captain in 1839. He saw active service in Algeria, and became chef d'escadron in 1849 and lieutenant-colonel in 1850. He took part as a colonel in the Crimean War, and after the battle of Inkerman received the rank of general of brigade.

In 1863 he was promoted general of division. When the Franco-German War broke out in 1870, de Cissey was given a divisional command in the Army of the Rhine, and he was included in the surrender of Bazaine's army at Metz. He was released from captivity only at the end of the war, and on his return was at once appointed by the Versailles government to a command in the army engaged in the suppression of the Commune.

From July 1871 de Cissey sat as a deputy, and he had already become minister of war. He occupied this post several times during the critical period of the reorganization of the French army, and served briefly as Prime Minister of France from 1874 to 1875. In 1875, he was elected senator for life. In 1880, whilst holding the command of the XI corps at Nantes, he was accused of having relations with a certain Baroness Lucie von Kaulla (1840–1891?), a descendant of Karoline Kaulla, who was said to be a spy in the pay of Germany, and he was in consequence relieved from duty. An inquiry subsequently held resulted in de Cissey's favour (1881).

== Cissey's Ministry, 22 May 1874 – 10 March 1875 ==
- Ernest Courtot de Cissey – President of the Council and Minister of War
- Louis Decazes – Minister of Foreign Affairs
- Oscar Bardi de Fourtou – Minister of the Interior
- Pierre Magne – Minister of Finance
- Adrien Tailhand – Minister of Justice
- Louis Raymond de Montaignac de Chauvance – Minister of Marine and Colonies
- Arthur de Cumont – Minister of Public Instruction, Fine Arts, and Worship
- Eugène Caillaux – Minister of Public Works
- Louis Grivart – Minister of Agriculture and Commerce

=== Changes ===
- 20 July 1874 – The Baron de Chabaud-Latour succeeds Fourtou as Minister of the Interior. Pierre Mathieu-Bodet succeeds Magne as Minister of Finance.

Political offices
| Preceded by Duc de Broglie | Prime Minister of France; 22 May 1874 – 10 March 1875 | Succeeded by Louis Buffet |
| Preceded by Adolphe Charles Le Flô | Minister of War; 5 June 1871 – 25 May 1873 | Succeeded by François Claude du Barail |
| Preceded by François Claude du Barail | Minister of War; 22 May 1874 – 15 August 1876 | Succeeded by Jean Auguste Berthaud |
