= Roger de Larcy =

French politician

Charles-Paulin-Roger Saubert, Baron de Larcy (20 August 1805 in Le Vigan, Gard – 6 October 1882 in Pierrelatte) was a French Legitimist politician. He served as Minister of Public Works from 19 February 1871 – 7 December 1872 and 26 November 1873 – 22 May 1874.

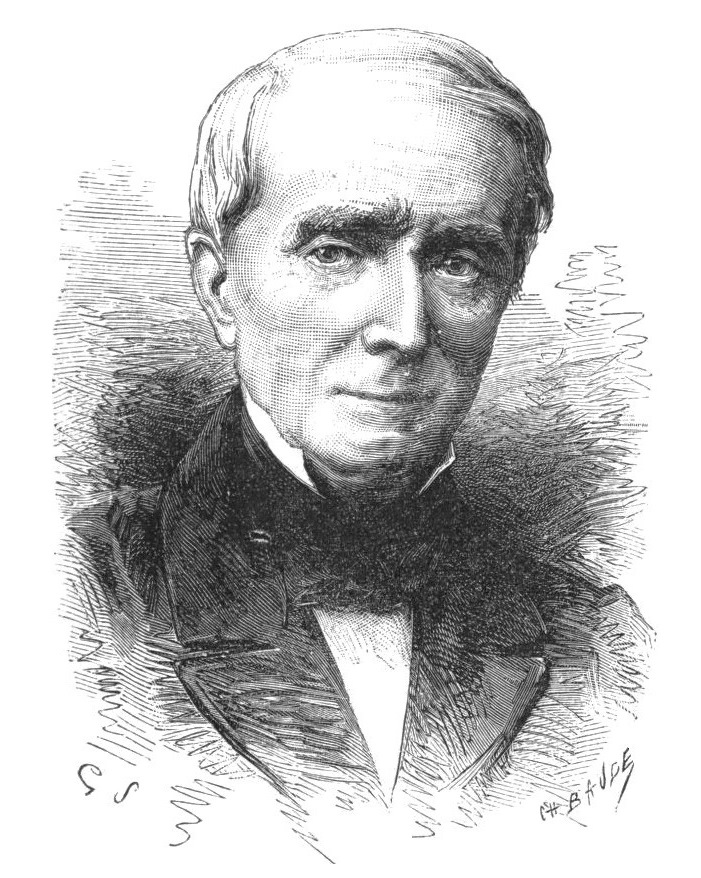
Portrait of Charles de Larcy, was a French Legitimist politician.
