= Pierre Edmond Teisserenc de Bort =

French writer and politician

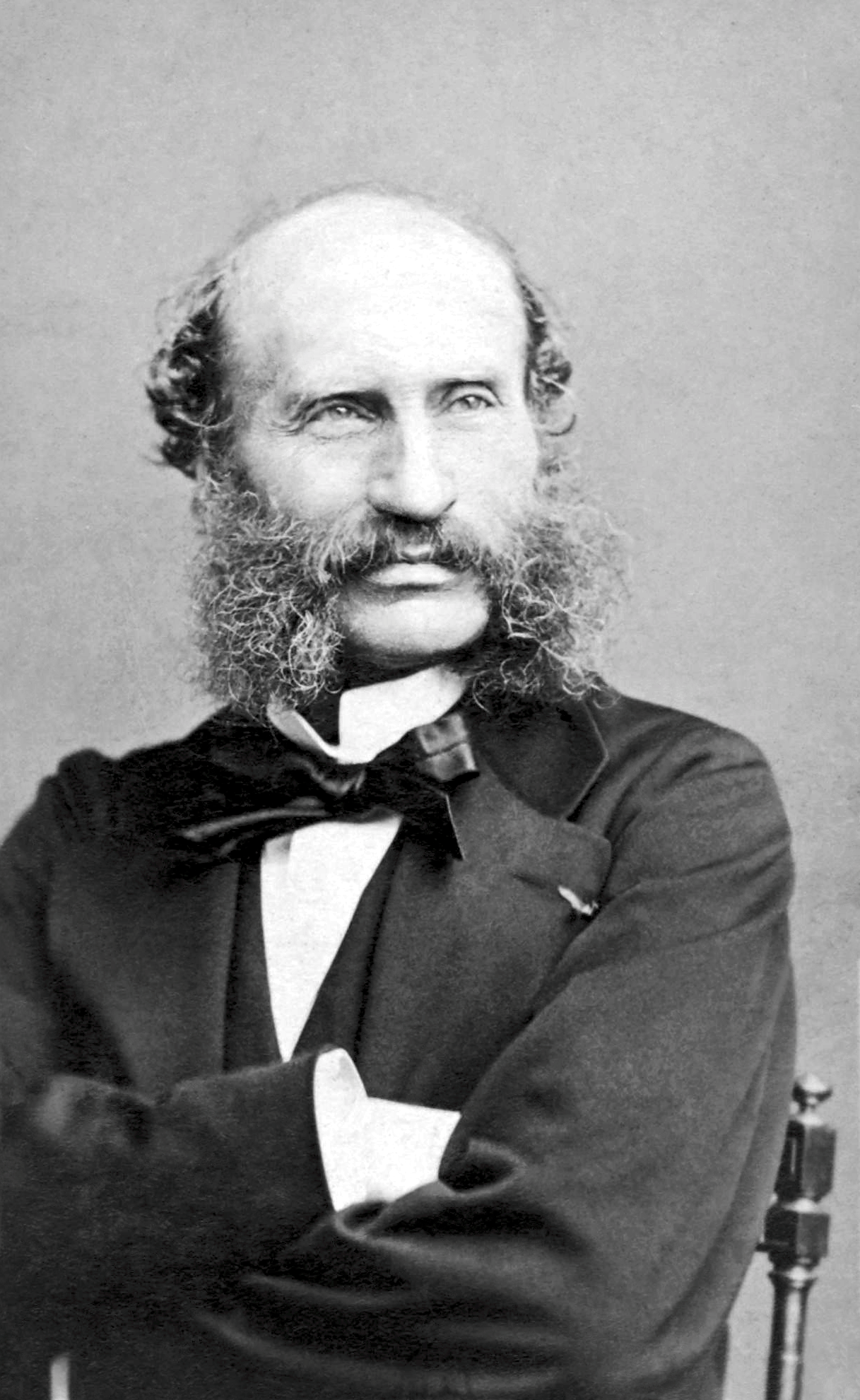
Pierre Edmond Teisserenc de Bort

Pierre Edmond Teisserenc de Bort (17 September 1814 at Châteauroux – 29 July 1892 in Paris), was a French writer and politician.

== Life ==
He entered the civil service after the completion of his education at the École Polytechnique. He was a railway expert, becoming secretary-general of the Railway Commission established in 1842, government commissioner to the authorized railway companies, administrator of the Lyon-Mediterranean railway, and commissioner to examine foreign railways.

In 1846 he was returned to the Chamber of Deputies for Hérault, but the revolution of 1848 drove him into private life, from which he only emerged after the downfall of the Second Empire, when in February 1871 he was returned to the National Assembly. He supported the government of Adolphe Thiers and was minister of agriculture and commerce in 1872–73.

He sat in the Left Centre, and steadily supported republican principles. He entered the Senate in 1876, and was minister of agriculture in the Dufaure-Ricard cabinet of that year, retaining his portfolio in the Jules Simon ministry which fell on 16 May 1877. In 1878, when he joined the new Dufaure cabinet, he opened the Paris exhibition of agriculture and manufactures, the original suggestion of which had been made by him during his 1876 ministry. In 1879 he was sent as ambassador to Vienna, whence he was next year recalled on the score of health. Two years later he re-entered the Senate, where he did good service to the cause of "Republican Defence" during the Boulangist agitation.

His works consist of discussions of railway policy from the technical and economic side.
