= Charles de Rémusat =

French politician and writer

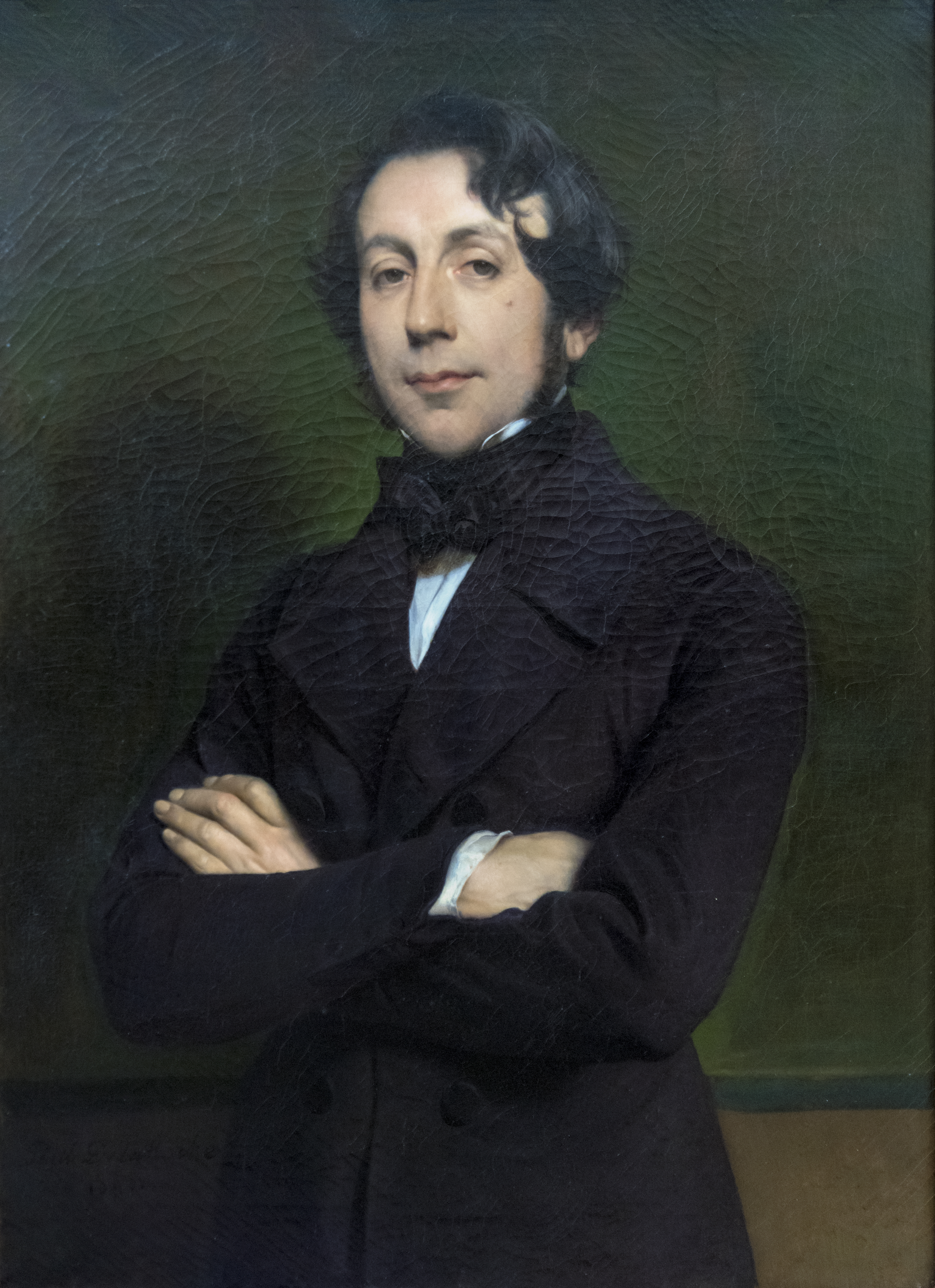
Portrait of Rémusat by Paul Delaroche

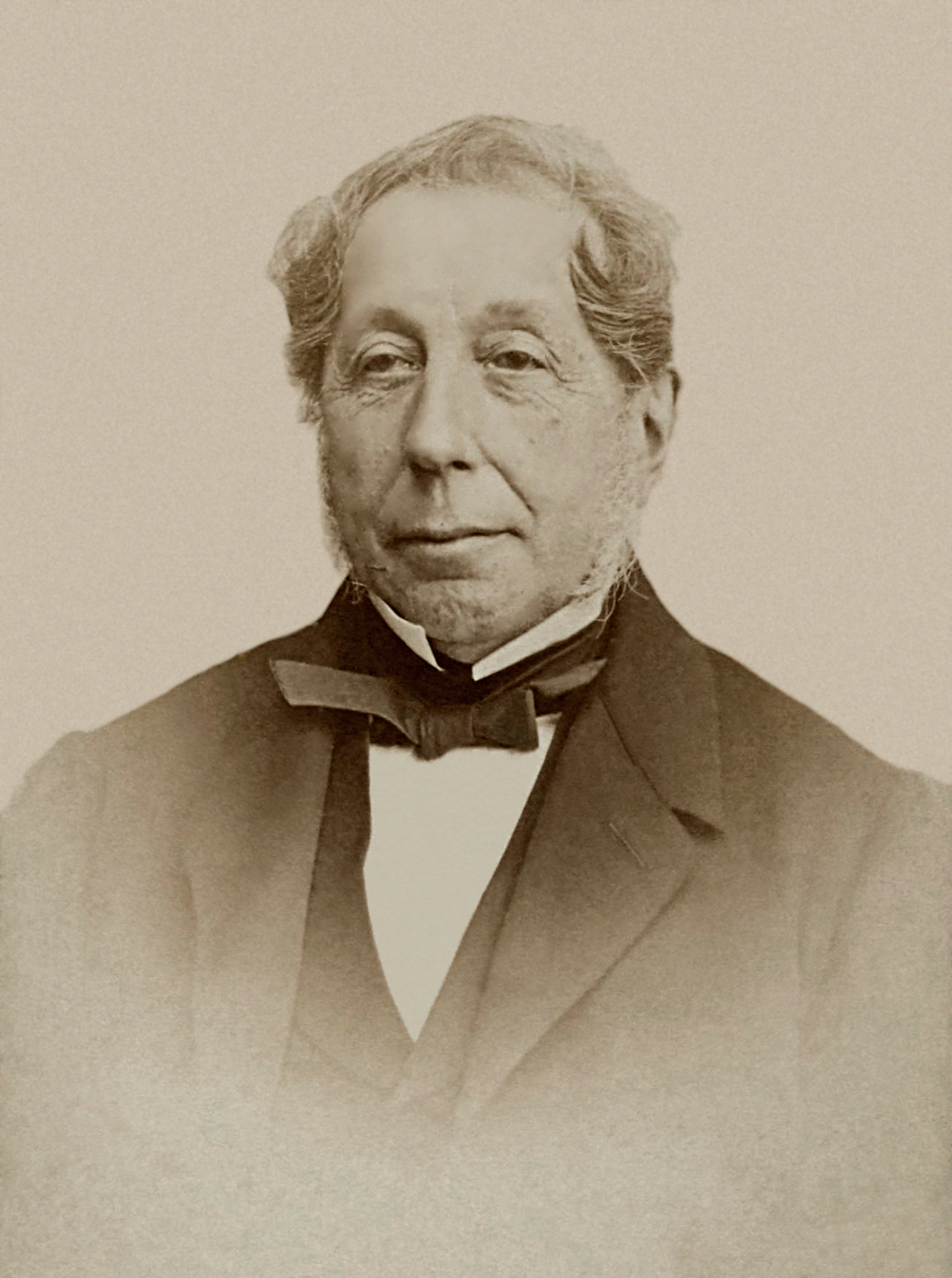
Rémusat by Charles Reutlinger, ca. 1865.

Charles François Marie, Comte de Rémusat (French: [ʃaʁl fʁɑ̃swa maʁi kɔ̃t də ʁemyza]; 13 March 1797 – 6 June 1875) was a French politician and writer.

== Biography ==
He was born in Paris. His father, Auguste Laurent, Comte de Rémusat, whose family came from Toulouse, was chamberlain to Napoleon Bonaparte, but acquiesced in the restoration and became prefect first of Haute Garonne, and then of Nord. Charles' mother was Claire Élisabeth Jeanne Gravier de Vergennes, Madame de Rémusat.

He developed political views more liberal than those of his parents, and having been brought up for a career in law, he published in 1820 a pamphlet on trial by jury. He was an active journalist, showing in philosophy and literature the influence of Victor Cousin, and is said to have furnished to no small extent the original of Honoré de Balzac's character, Henri de Marsay. He signed the journalists' protest against the Ordinances of July 1830, and in the following October was elected deputy for Haute Garonne.

Becoming a Doctrinaire, he supported most of those measures of restriction on popular liberty which made the July monarchy unpopular with French Radicals. In 1836 he became for a short time undersecretary of state for the interior. He then became an ally of Adolphe Thiers, and in 1840 held the ministry of the interior for a brief period. In the same year he became an Academician. For the rest of Louis Philippe's reign he was in opposition until he joined Thiers in his attempt at a ministry in the spring of 1848. During this time Rémusat constantly spoke in the chair here, but was still more active in literature, especially on philosophical subjects, the most remarkable of his works being his book on Pierre Abélard (2 vols., 1845). He had to leave France after the coup d'état; nor did he re-enter political life during the Second Empire until 1869, when he founded a moderate opposition journal at Toulouse. Neither the Revolution of 1848 nor the Second Empire was to his taste. Eventually he gave up hope for the restoration of constitutional monarchy in France and he declared himself in favor of the Third French Republic: "I have never desired anything else than the peaceful triumph of the great principles of the French Revolution. I hoped that the monarchy would bring it forth; today I put my hopes in the Republic, firmly maintained and wisely organized."

In 1871 he refused the Vienna embassy offered him by Thiers, but in August he was appointed minister of foreign affairs in succession to Jules Favre. Although minister he was not a deputy, and on standing for Paris in September 1873 he was beaten by Désiré Barodet. A month later he was elected (having already resigned with Thiers) for Haute Garonne by a great majority. He died in Paris.

During his abstention from politics Rémusat continued to write on philosophical history, especially English. Saint Anselme de Cantorbéry appeared in 1854; L'Angleterre au ... son temps, etc., in 1858; John Wesley in 1870; Lord Herbert de Cherbury in 1874; Histoire de la philosophie en Angleterre depuis Bacon jusqu'à Locke in 1875; besides other and minor works. He wrote well, was a forcible speaker and an acute critic; but his adoption of the indeterminate eclecticism of Cousin in philosophy and of the somewhat similarly indeterminate liberalism of Thiers in politics probably limited his powers, though both no doubt accorded with his critical and unenthusiastic turn of mind. He was elected a Foreign Honorary Member of the American Academy of Arts and Sciences in 1873.

== Selected works ==
- Essais de philosophie (1842)
- Abélard (2 vol. 1845)
- Sur la philosophie allemande (1845)
- Saint Anselme de Cantorbéry (1854). Tableau de la vie monastique et de la lutte du pouvoir spirituel onzième siècle.
- Critiques et études littéraires (2 volumes, 1857)
- Politique libérale ou Fragments pour servir à la défense de la Révolution française (1860)
- Channing, sa vie et ses œuvres (1862)
- Philosophie religieuse; de la théologie naturelle en France et en Angleterre, Éd. Germer Baillière, coll. «Bibliothèque de philosophie contemporaine» (1864)
- John Wesley et le méthodisme (1870)
- Lord Herbert de Cherbury (1874). Exposition, avec une grande liberté d'esprit, de la doctrine de Lord Herbert, qui peut être regardé comme le fondateur de la religion naturelle en Angleterre.
- Casimir Perier (1874)
- Histoire de la philosophie en Angleterre depuis Bacon jusqu'à Locke (1875)
- Mémoires de ma vie

Political offices
Preceded by Charles Duchâtel	Minister of the Interior; 1840	Succeeded by Charles Duchâtel
Preceded by Jules Favre	Minister of Foreign Affairs; 1871–1873	Succeeded by Duc de Broglie
