= Auguste Casimir-Perier =

French diplomat and politician (1811–1876)

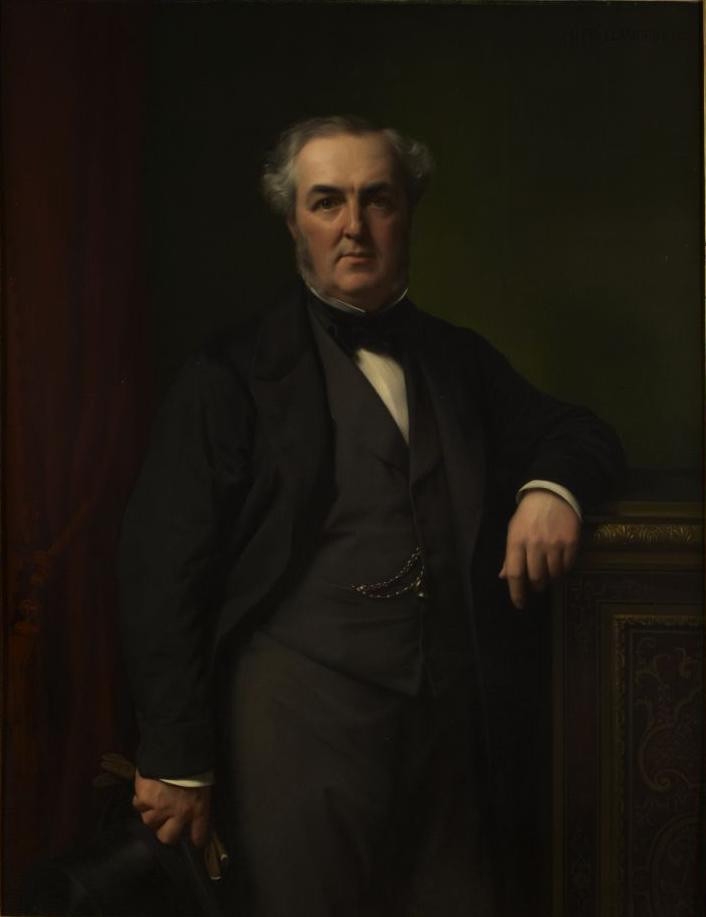
Auguste Casimir-Perier, (Musée de la Révolution française).

Auguste Victor Laurent Casimir-Perier (20 August 1811, in Paris – 6 June 1876) was a French diplomat and political leader. He was the son of Prime Minister Casimir Pierre Perier and the father of President Jean Casimir-Perier.

He entered the diplomatic service, being attached successively to the London, Brussels and St Petersburg embassies and in 1843 became minister plenipotentiary at Hanover.

In 1846 he resigned from the service to enter the legislature as deputy for the département of Seine, a constituency which he exchanged for another one in the département of Aube after the Revolution of 1848.

On the establishment of the Second Empire he retired temporarily from public life, and devoted himself to economic questions of which he published a series of works, notably Les Finances et la politique (1863), dealing with the interaction of political institutions and finance. He contested Grenoble unsuccessfully in 1863 against the imperial candidate, Casimir Royer; and failed again for Aube in 1869.

In 1871 he was returned by three départements to the National Assembly, and elected to sit for Aube. He joined the Centre gauche parliamentary group. He was minister of the interior for a few months from 11 October 1871 to 6 February 1872, and his retirement deprived Thiers of one of the strongest elements in his cabinet. He also joined the short-lived ministry of May 1873 (18 to 25 May). He consistently opposed all efforts in the direction of a monarchical restoration, but on the definite constitution of the republic became a senator for life, declining Mac-Mahon's invitation to form the first cabinet under the new constitution. He died in Paris.
