= Oscar Bardi de Fourtou =

French politician (1836–1897)

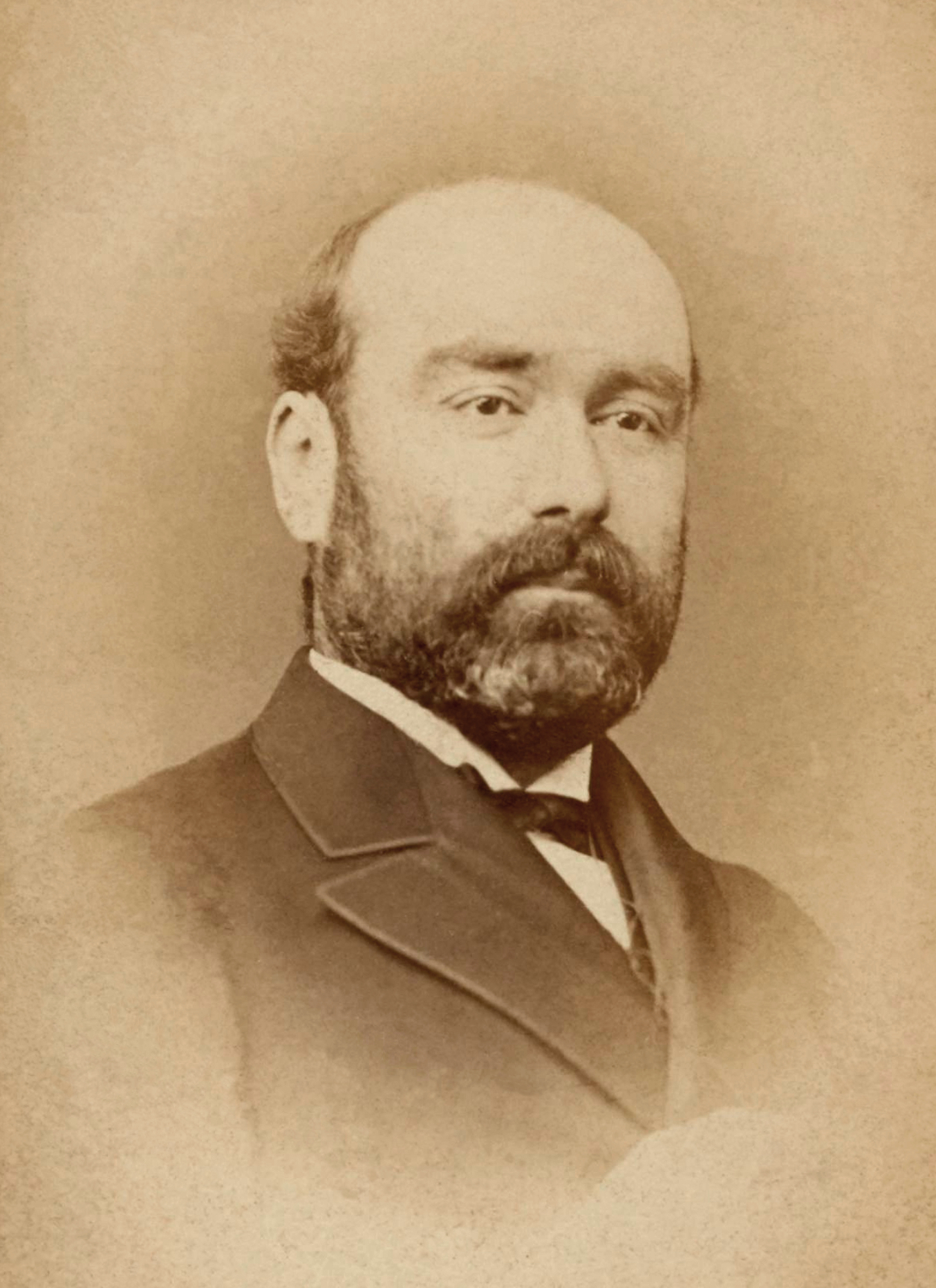
- Photograph by Eugène Appert

Minister of Public Works
- In office 7 December 1872 – 18 May 1873

Personal details
- Born: Marie François Oscar Bardi de Fourtou; 3 January 1836; Ribérac, France
- Died: 6 December 1897 (aged 61); Paris, France

Marie François Oscar Bardi de Fourtou (3 January 1836 – 6 December 1897) was a French politician. Born into a bourgeois family, he served as Minister of Transport from 7 December 1872 to 18 May 1873. He also served as Minister of Interior and Minister of Public Instruction, in which he "carried out aggressively conservative policies by dismissing certain liberal professors and re-establishing censorship."

== Biography ==
There he proved a useful adherent to Thiers, who made him minister of public works in December 1872. He was minister of religion in the cabinet of 18–24 May 1873, being the only member of the Right included by Thiers in that short-lived ministry. As minister of education, religion and the fine arts in the reconstructed cabinet of the duc de Broglie he had used his administrative powers to further clerical ends, and as minister of the interior in de Broglie's cabinet in 1877 he resumed the administrative methods of the Second French Empire. With a well-known Bonapartist, Baron R. C. F. Reille, as his secretary, he replaced republican functionaries by Bonapartist partisans, reserving a few places for the Legitimists. In the general elections of that year he used the whole weight of officialdom to secure a majority for the Right, to support a clerical and reactionary programme.

He accompanied Marshal MacMahon in his tour through southern France, and the presidential manifesto of September, stating that the president would rely solely on the Senate should the elections prove unfavourable, was generally attributed to Fourtou. In spite of these efforts the cabinet fell, and a commission was appointed to inquire into their unconstitutional abuse of power. Fourtou was unseated in consequence of the revelations made in the report of the commission. In the Chamber of Deputies Gambetta gave the lie direct to Fourtou's allegation that the republican party opposed every republican principle that was not antiquated.

In November 1878, Fourtou participated in the most laughable duel ever fought with Léon Gambetta at Plessis-Picquet. Both duelers were accompanied by their seconds and surgeons. A thick French November fog consumed the field so much that it obscured a hand held to a face. The duel required thirty-five paces between the two men. Besides the fog, Fourtou is reported to have said "Monsieur Gambetta has but one eye, and I am short-sighted; so the game will be about even." It was rendered additionally even with the dense fog. The danger of the duel no longer fell to the duelists, but the spectators and doctors. Miraculously the two bullets that were exchanged missed all persons in attendance. With Fourtou and Gambetta's honor satisfied, the two parties went home.

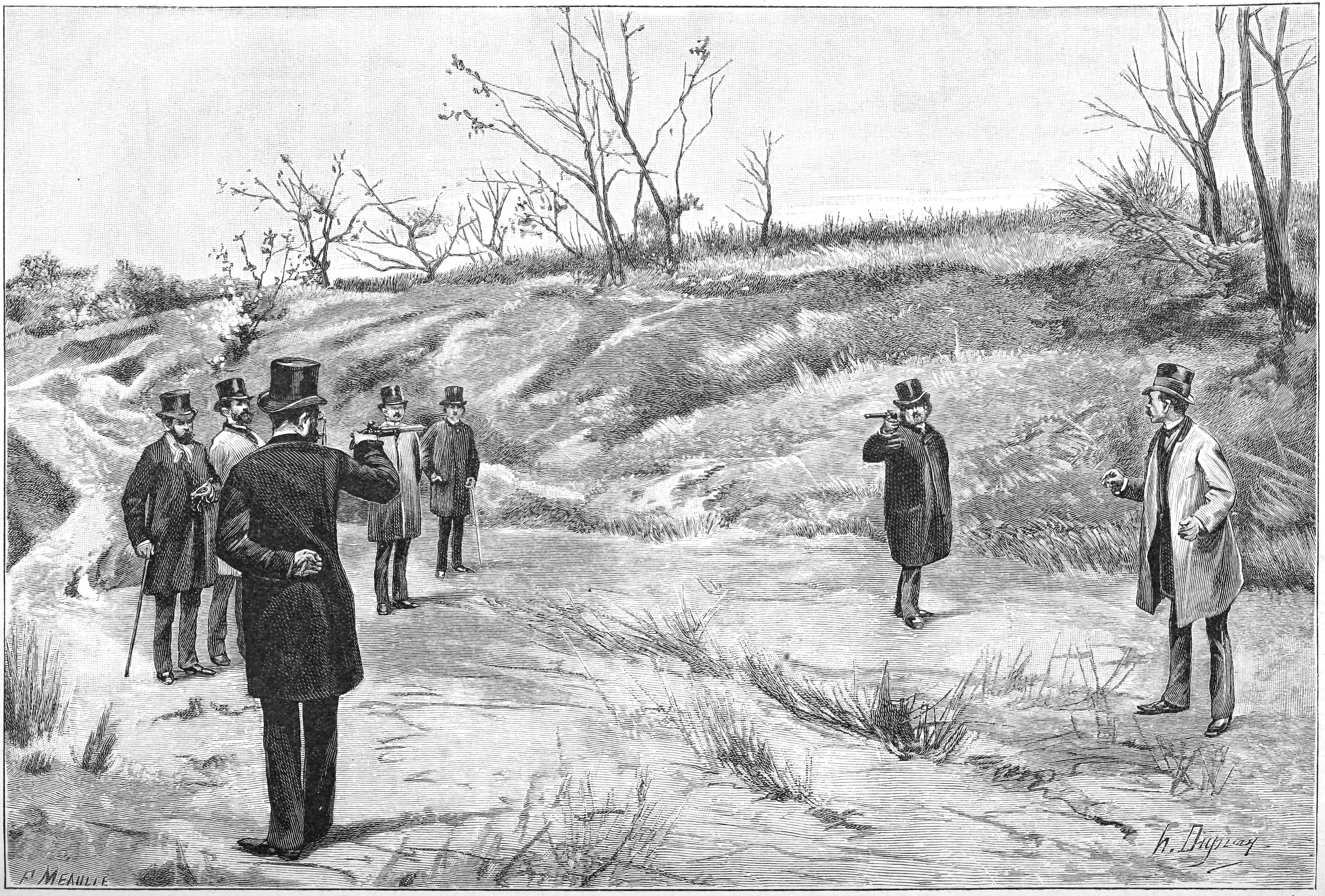
The duel fought by Oscar Bardi de Fourtou and Léon Gambetta in 1878, as illustrated by Henri Dupray

A duel was fought in consequence, but neither party was injured. He was re-elected to the chamber in 1879 and entered the Senate the next year. Failing to secure re-election to the Senate in 1885 he again entered the popular chamber as Legitimist candidate in 1889, but he took no further active part in politics. He died in Paris in 1897 of tuberculosis.

His works include Histoire de Louis XVI (1840); Histoire de Saint Pie V (1845); Mme Swetchine, sa vie et ses œuvres (2 vols., 1859); La Question italienne (1860); De la centre-revolution (1876); and Mémoires d'un royaliste (2 vols., 1888).
