= Jules Favre =

French statesman and lawyer

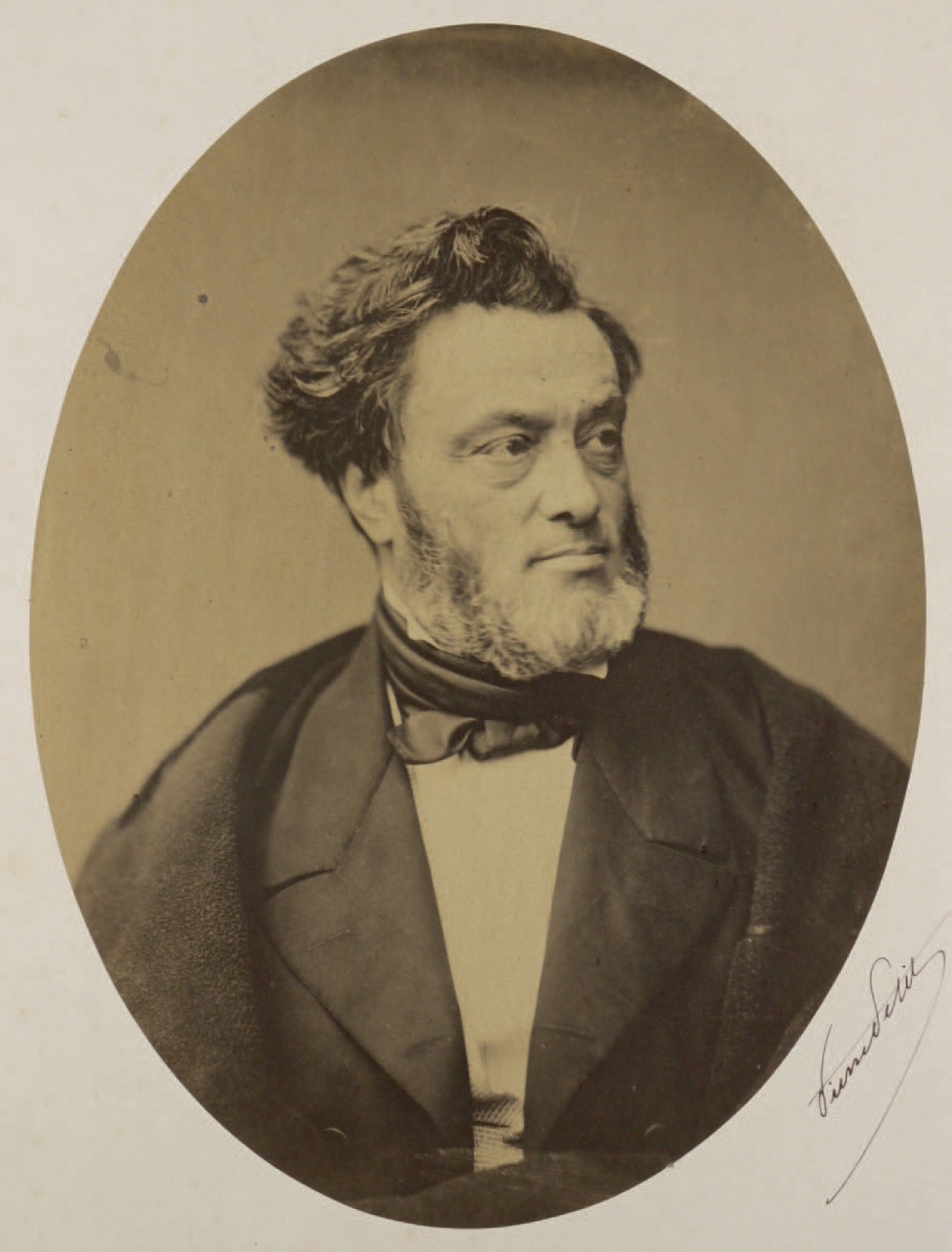
Portrait by Pierre Petit, 1860s

Jules Claude Gabriel Favre (21 March 1809 – 20 January 1880) was a French statesman and lawyer. After the establishment of the Third Republic in September 1870, he became one of the leaders of the Moderate Republicans in the National Assembly.

== Early years ==
He was born in Lyon, and began his career as a lawyer. From the time of the Revolution of 1830, he openly declared himself a republican, and in political trials he took the opportunity to express this opinion. After the Revolution of 1848 he was elected deputy for Lyon to the Constituent Assembly, where he sat among the Moderate Republicans, voting against the socialists. When Louis Napoleon was elected President of France, Favre openly opposed him.On 2 December 1851 he tried with Victor Hugo and others to organize armed resistance in the streets of Paris. After the coup d'état, he withdrew from politics, returned to the legal profession, distinguishing himself by his defence of Felice Orsini, the perpetrator of the attack against the life of Napoleon III.

In 1858 he was elected deputy for Paris, being one of the "Five" who gave the signal for the republican opposition to the Empire. In 1863 he became the head of his party and delivered a number of addresses denouncing the Mexican expedition and the occupation of Rome. These addresses, eloquent, clear and incisive, won him a seat in the Académie française in 1867.

== Franco-Prussian War and Third Republic ==
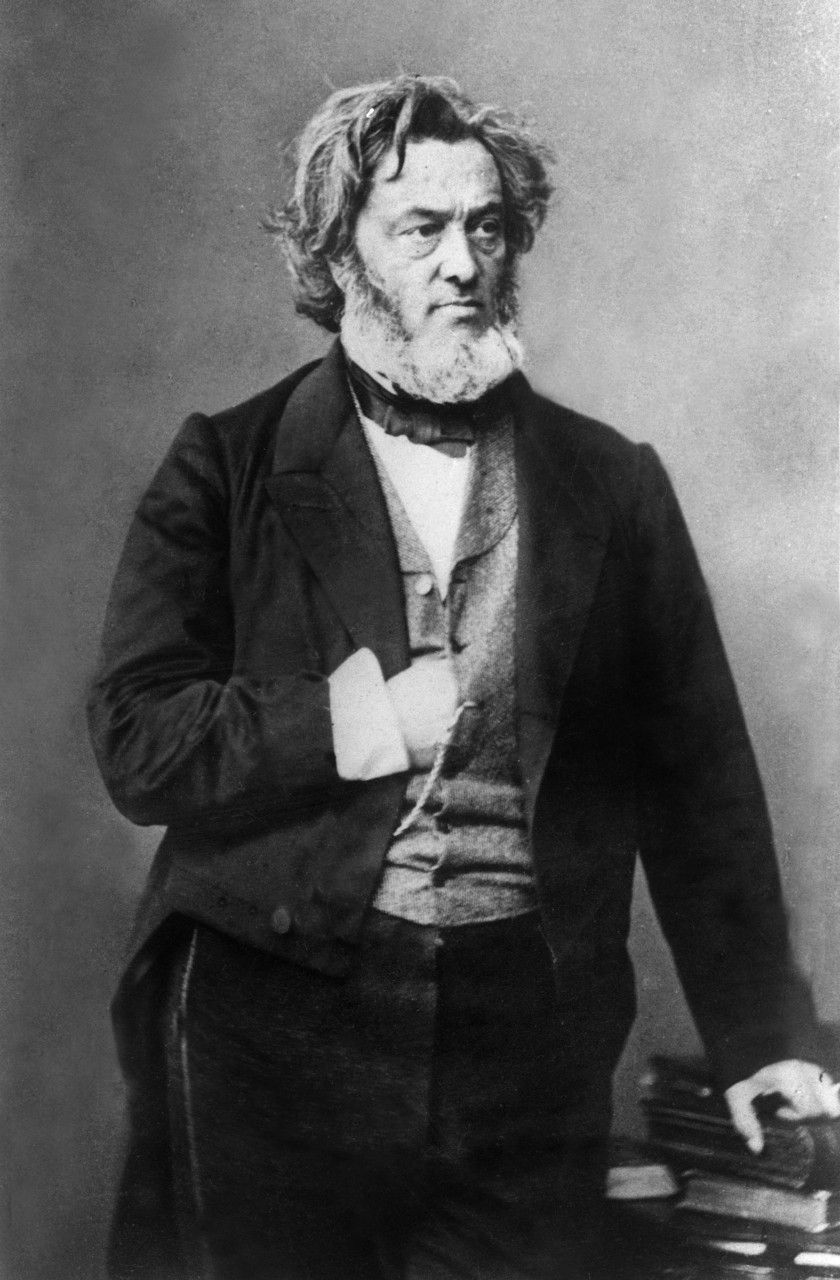
Jules Favre in 1865, photo taken by Nadar.

With Adolphe Thiers he opposed the war against Prussia in 1870, and at the news of the defeat of Napoleon III at Sedan he demanded the deposition of the emperor. Favre opposed the removal of the government from Paris during the siege.

In the government of National Defence he became vice-president under General Trochu, and minister of foreign affairs, with the onerous task of negotiating peace with victorious Germany. He proved to be less adroit as a diplomat than he had been as an orator, and committed several irreparable blunders. His famous statement on 6 September 1870, that he "would not yield to Germany an inch of territory nor a single stone of the fortresses" was a piece of oratory which Bismarck met on the 19th by his declaration to Favre that Alsace and Lorraine had to be ceded as a condition of peace.

He arranged for the armistice of 28 January 1871 without knowing the situation of the armies, and without consulting the government at Bordeaux. By a grave oversight, he neglected to inform Léon Gambetta that the Army of the East (80,000 men) was not included in the armistice, and it was thus obliged to retreat to neutral territory. He showed no diplomatic skill in the negotiations for the Treaty of Frankfurt, and it was Bismarck who imposed all the conditions. He withdrew from the ministry, discredited, on 2 August 1871, but remained in the Chamber of Deputies as a member of the Opportunist parliamentary group, Gauche républicaine. Elected Senator on 30 January 1876, he continued to support the government of the republic against the reactionary opposition until his death on 20 January 1880.

== Post-war scandal ==
Favre turned out to have a skeleton in his closet, although he probably never saw it as such. He had a series of children with a married woman who never got a divorce. Although Favre recognized these children as his own legally, the story did not become known generally until after 1871, when his bungling of the diplomacy with Bismarck left him a good target for political enemies. The story was released, and Favre did win damages against one of the men who released it, but whatever influence he might still have had was smashed. Ironically, it is apparent that his old opponent, Napoleon III knew of the situation, but as Favre never attacked the Emperor about his sexual affairs, the Emperor respected Favre on the same issue.

== Descendants ==
Favre was the grandfather of the Existential Thomist philosopher and theologian Jacques Maritain, through Favre's daughter Geneviève.

== Works ==
His works include many speeches and addresses, notably La Liberté de la Presse (1849), Défense de F. Orsini (1866), Discours de réception a l'Académie française (1868), Discours sur la liberté intérieure (1869). In Le Gouvernement de la Défense Nationale, 3 vols., 1871–1875, he explained his role in 1870–1871.

After Favre's death his wife Julie Velten Favre, an educator and philosopher who had collaborated with Favre during their marriage, compiled and edited his speeches into 8 volumes.
