= National Assembly (France, 1871) =

Former legislative body of France

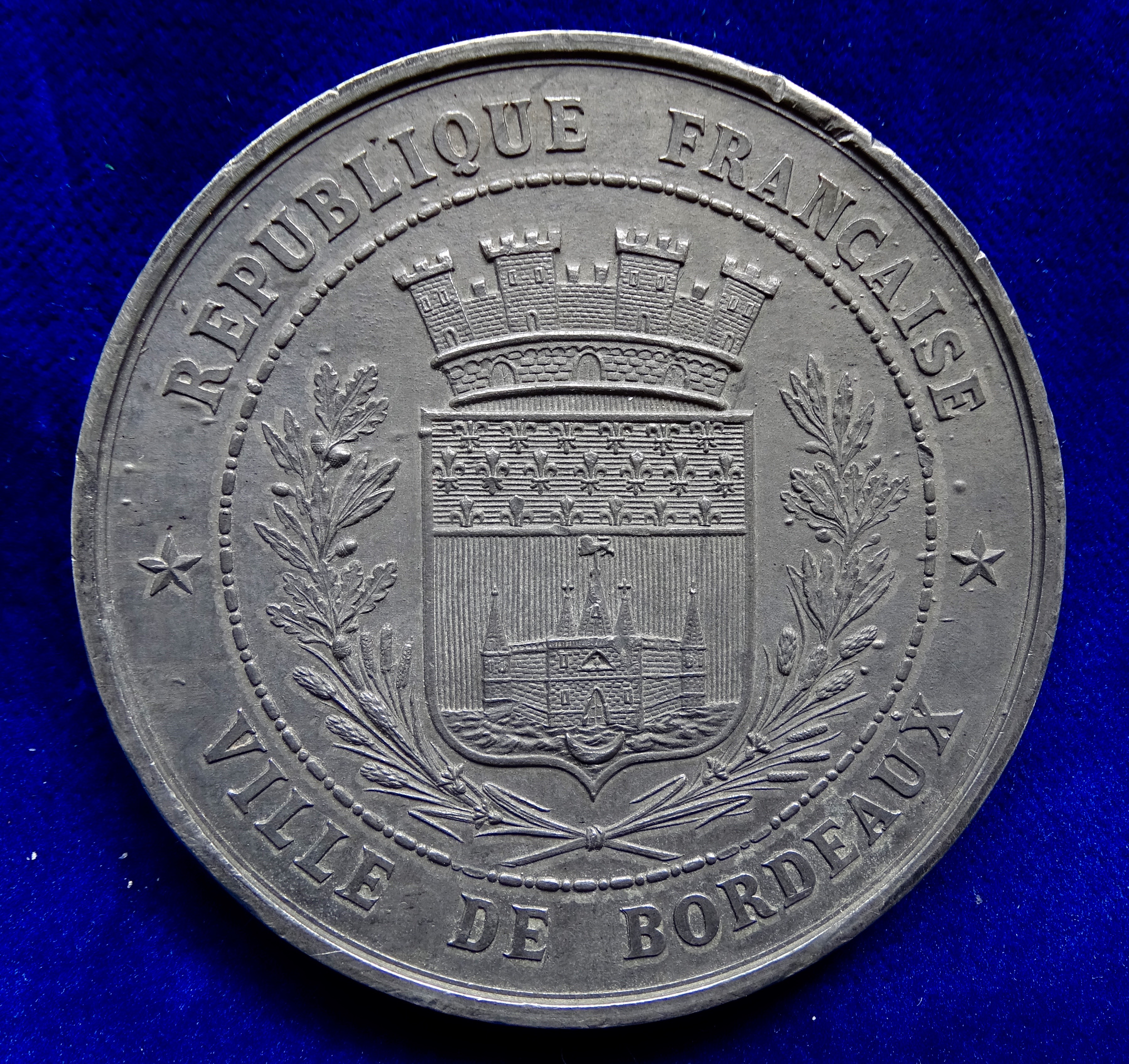
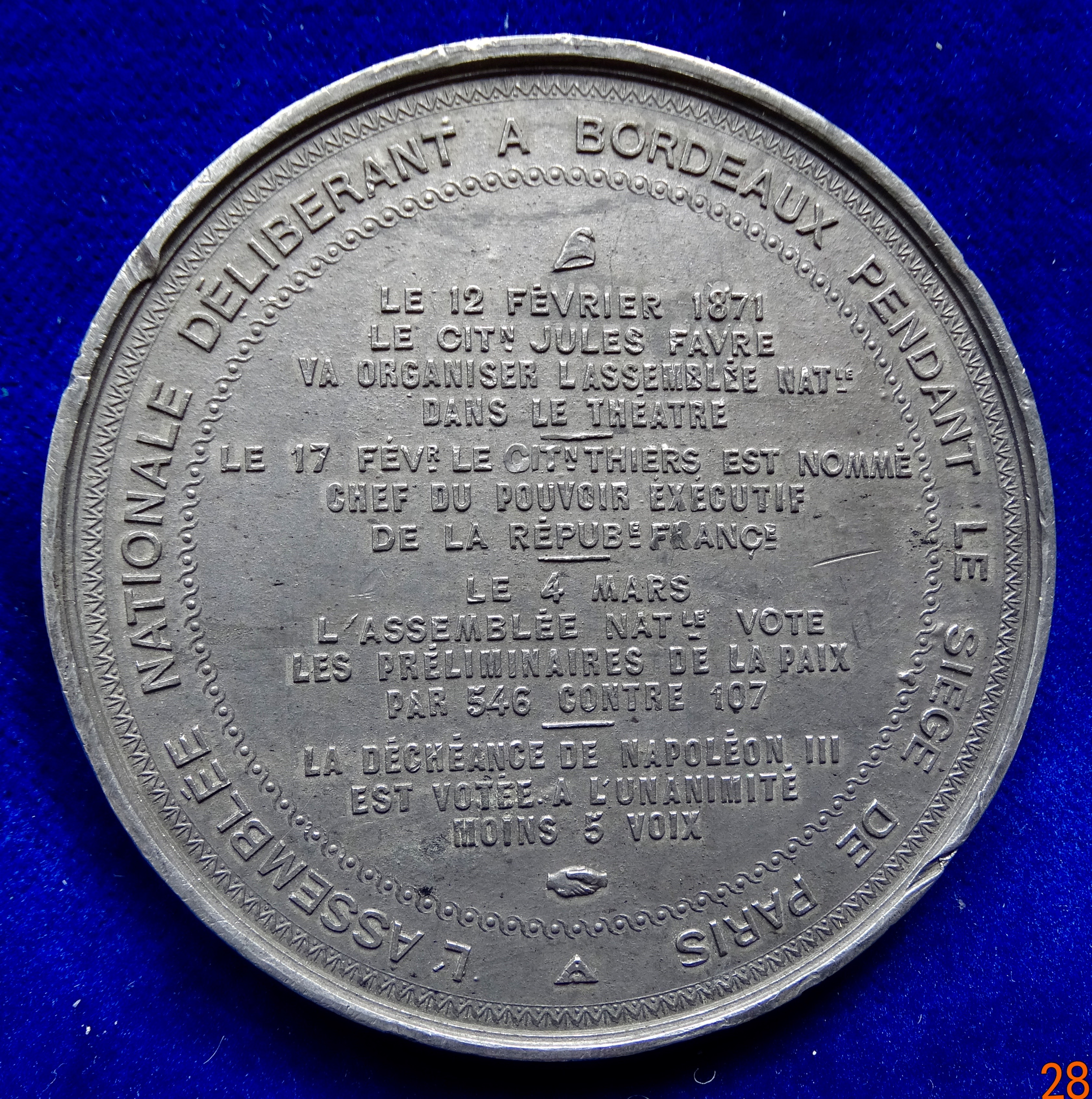
Numismatic reference of the first decisions of the National Assembly at the Grand Théâtre de Bordeaux in February and March 1871, obverse and reverse.

The National Assembly (French: Assemblée nationale) was a French unicameral legislative body elected on 8 February 1871 in the wake of the Armistice of Versailles signed on 26 January 1871 at the end of the Franco-Prussian War. It sat in Bordeaux until 20 March 1871, when it moved to the Palace of Versailles near Paris. The cabinets which issued from it governed France from 19 February 1871 to 31 December 1875.

== See also ==
- Commune of Paris
- French constitutional laws of 1875

== Sources ==
- Bernard Noël, Dictionnaire de la Commune, Flammarion, collection Champs, 1978
- Jean-Pierre Azéma et Michel Winock, Naissance et mort. La Troisième République, Collection Pluriel, 1978
- Antoine Olivesi et André Nouschi, La France de 1848 à 1914, Nathan Université, collection fac Histoire, 1997.
