= List of ministers of justice of France =

This is a list of justice ministers of France, working for the French Ministry of Justice.

== 1790 to the Consulate ==
- 21 November 1790 – 23 March 1792: Marguerite-Louis-François Duport-Dutertre
- 23 March 1792 – 12 April 1792: Jean-Marie Roland de la Platière
- 13 April 1792 – 4 July 1792: Antoine Duranton
- 4 July 1792 – 10 August 1792: Étienne de Joly
- 10 August 1792 – 6 October 1792: Georges Jacques Danton
- 9 October 1792 – 19 March 1793: Dominique Joseph Garat
- 20 March 1793 – 23 April 1794: Louis-Jérôme Gohier
- 4 November 1795 – 2 January 1796: Philippe-Antoine Merlin de Douai
- 5 January 1796 – 4 April 1796: Jean-Joseph-Victor Genissieu
- 10 February 1797 – 3 September 1797: Philippe-Antoine Merlin de Douai
- 24 September 1797 – 20 July 1799: Charles Lambrechts
- 14 June 1799 – 9 November 1799: Jean-Jacques-Régis de Cambacérès
- 9 November 1799 – 13 September 1802: André Joseph Abrial

== Consulate to the Revolution of 1848 ==
- 14 September 1802 – 18 November 1813: Claude Ambroise Régnier
- 19 November 1813 – 11 April 1814: Mathieu Molé
- 3 April 1814 – 13 May 1814: Pierre Paul Nicolas Henrion de Pansey
- 13 May 1814 – 20 March 1815: Charles Henri Dambray (interim)
- 20 March 1815 – 22 June 1815: Jean-Jacques-Régis de Cambacérès
- 22 June 1815 – 7 July 1815: Antoine Boulay de la Meurthe
- 9 July 1815 – 27 September 1815: Étienne-Denis Pasquier
- 28 September 1815 – 10 May 1816: François Barbé-Marbois
- 11 May 1816 – 19 January 1817: Charles Henri Dambray (interim)
- 19 January 1817 – 27 December 1818: Étienne-Denis Pasquier
- 28 December 1818 – 13 December 1821: Pierre de Serre
- 14 December 1821 – 4 January1828: Pierre-Denis de Peyronnet
- 5 January 1828 – 13 March 1829: Joseph-Marie Portalis
- 14 May 1829 – 8 August 1829: Pierre-Alpinien Bourdeau
- 8 August 1829 – 19 May 1830: Jean de Courvoisier
- 19 May 1830 – 31 July 1830: Jean de Chantelauze
- 31 July 1830 – 27 December 1830: Jacques Charles Dupont de l'Eure
- 27 December 1830 – 13 March 1831: Joseph Mérilhou
- 13 March 1831 – 11 February 1832: Félix Barthe
- 11 February 1832 – 22 February 1836: Jean-Charles Persil
- 22 February 1836 – 5 September 1836: Paul Jean Pierre Sauzet
- 6 September 1836 – 15 April 1837: Jean-Charles Persil
- 15 April 1837 – 31 March 1839: Félix Barthe
- 31 March 1839 – 12 May 1839: Amédée Girod de l'Ain
- 12 May 1839 – 1 March 1840: Jean-Baptiste Teste
- 1 March 1840 – 29 October 1840: Alexandre-François Vivien
- 29 October 1840 – 13 March 1847: Nicolas Martin du Nord
- 14 March 1847 – 24 February 1848: Michel Hébert

== Under the Provisional Government of 1848 and the Second Republic ==
- 24 February 1848 – 7 June 1848: Adolphe Crémieux
- 7 June 1848 – 17 July 1848: Eugène Bethmont
- 17 July 1848 – 20 December 1848: Pierre Marie de Saint-Georges
- 20 December 1848 – 31 October 1849: Odilon Barrot, simultaneously President of the Council
- 31 October 1849 – 24 January 1851: Eugène Rouher
- 24 January 1851 – 10 April 1851: Ernest de Royer
- 10 April 1851 – 26 October 1851: Eugène Rouher
- 26 October 1851 – 1 November 1851: Eugène Corbin
- 1 November 1851 – 3 December 1851: Alfred Daviel
- 3 December 1851 – 22 January 1852: Eugène Rouher

== Second Empire ==
- 22 January 1852 – 11 November 1857: Jacques Pierre Abbatucci
- 16 November 1857 – 5 May 1859: Ernest de Royer
- 5 May 1859 – 23 June 1863: Claude Delangle
- 23 June 1863 – 17 July 1869: Pierre Jules Baroche
- 17 July 1869 – 2 January 1870: Jean-Baptiste Duvergier
- 2 January 1870 – 10 August 1870: Émile Ollivier
- 10 August 1870 – 4 September 1870: Théodore Grandperret

== Paris Commune ==
- 16 April 1871 – 28 May 1871: Eugène Protot

== Third Republic ==
List of ministers of justice of the French Third Republic
Minister	Titled	Party	Took office	Left office	Government	Ref.
Adolphe Crémieux	Minister of Justice	Opposition	4 September 1870	19 February 1871	Government of National Defense	
Presidency of Adolphe Thiers
Jules Dufaure	Minister of Justice	Centre Left	19 February 1871	25 May 1873	Dufaure I Dufaure II	
Presidency of Patrice de Mac Mahon
Jean Ernoul	Minister of Justice	Legitimist	25 May 1873	26 November 1873	de Broglie I	
Octave Depeyre	Minister of Justice	Legitimist	26 November 1873	22 May 1874	de Broglie II	
Adrien Tailhand	Minister of Justice	Orléanist	22 May 1874	10 March 1875	Courtot de Cissey	
Jules Dufaure	Minister of Justice	Moderate Republicans	10 March 1875	12 December 1876	Buffet; Dufaure III; Dufaure IV	
Louis Martel	Minister of Justice	Centre Left	12 December 1876	17 May 1877	Simon	
Albert de Broglie	Minister of Justice	Orléanist	17 May 1877	23 November 1877	de Broglie III	
François Le Pelletier	Minister of Justice	Independent	23 November 1877	13 December 1877	de Rochebouët	
Jules Dufaure	Minister of Justice	Centre Left	13 December 1877	4 February 1879	Dufaure V	
Philippe Le Royer	Minister of Justice	Republican Left	4 February 1879	28 December 1879	Henry Waddington	
Presidency of Jules Grévy
Jules Cazot	Keeper of the Seals, Minister of Justice	Republican Left	28 December 1879	30 January 1882	de Freycinet I Ferry I Gambetta	
Gustave Humbert	Keeper of the Seals, Minister of Justice	Independent	30 January 1882	7 August 1882	de Freycinet II	
Paul Devès	Keeper of the Seals, Minister of Justice	Republican Left	7 August 1882	21 February 1883	Duclerc; Fallières	
Félix Martin-Feuillée	Keeper of the Seals, Minister of Justice	Republican Union	21 February 1883	6 April 1885	Ferry II	
Henri Brisson	Keeper of the Seals, Minister of Justice	Republican Union	6 April 1885	7 January 1886	Ferry II	
Charles Demôle	Keeper of the Seals, Minister of Justice	Republican Union	7 January 1886	11 December 1886	de Freycinet III	
Ferdinand Sarrien	Keeper of the Seals, Minister of Justice	Republican Union	11 December 1886	30 May 1887	Goblet	
Charles Mazeau	Keeper of the Seals, Minister of Justice	Republican Union	30 May 1887	30 November 1887	Rouvier I	
Presidency of Sadi Carnot
Armand Fallières	Keeper of the Seals, Minister of Justice	Democratic Alliance	30 November 1887	3 April 1888	Tirard I	
Jean-Baptiste Ferrouillat	Keeper of the Seals, Minister of Justice	Republican Union	3 April 1888	5 February 1889	Floquet	
Edmond Guyot-Dessaigne	Keeper of the Seals, Minister of Justice	Republican Union	6 February 1889	15 February 1889	Floquet	
François Thévenet	Keeper of the Seals, Minister of Justice	Extreme Left	22 February 1889	17 March 1890	Tirard II	
Armand Fallières	Keeper of the Seals, Minister of Justice	Democratic Alliance	17 March 1890	27 February 1892	de Freycinet IV	
Louis Ricard	Keeper of the Seals, Minister of Justice	Independent	27 February 1892	6 December 1892	Loubet	
Léon Bourgeois	Keeper of the Seals, Minister of Justice	Radical Party	6 December 1892	12 March 1893	Ribot I Ribot II	
Jules Develle	Keeper of the Seals, Minister of Justice	Republican Union	12 March 1893	13 March 1893	Ribot II	
Léon Bourgeois	Keeper of the Seals, Minister of Justice	Radical Party	13 March 1893	4 April 1893	Ribot II	
Eugène Guérin	Keeper of the Seals, Minister of Justice	Radical Party	4 April 1893	3 December 1893	Dupuy I	
Antonin Dubost	Keeper of the Seals, Minister of Justice	Radical Left	3 December 1893	30 May 1894	Casimir-Perier	
Presidency of Jean Casimir-Perier
Eugène Guérin	Keeper of the Seals, Minister of Justice	Radical Party	30 May 1894	26 January 1895	Dupuy II; Dupuy III	
Presidency of Félix Faure
Ludovic Trarieux	Keeper of the Seals, Minister of Justice	Republican Left	26 January 1895	1 November 1895	Ribot III	
Louis Ricard	Keeper of the Seals, Minister of Justice	Non-Attached	1 November 1895	29 April 1896	Bourgeois	
Jean-Baptiste Darlan	Keeper of the Seals, Minister of Justice	Progressive Union	29 April 1896	1 December 1897	Méline	
Victor Milliard	Keeper of the Seals, Minister of Justice	Non-Attached	3 December 1897	28 June 1898	Méline	
Ferdinand Sarrien	Keeper of the Seals, Minister of Justice	Republican Union	28 June 1898	1 November 1898	Brisson II	
Presidency of Émile Loubet
Georges Lebret	Keeper of the Seals, Minister of Justice	Non-Attached	1 November 1898	22 June 1899	Dupuy IV; Dupuy V	
Ernest Monis	Keeper of the Seals, Minister of Justice	Radical Party	22 June 1899	7 June 1902	Waldeck-Rousseau	
Ernest Vallé	Keeper of the Seals, Minister of Justice	Radical Party	7 June 1902	24 January 1905	Combes	
Presidency of Armand Fallières
Joseph Chaumié	Keeper of the Seals, Minister of Justice	Democratic Republican Alliance	24 January 1905	14 March 1906	Rouvier II; Rouvier III	
Ferdinand Sarrien	Keeper of the Seals, Minister of Justice	PRRRS	14 March 1906	25 October 1906	Sarrien	
Edmond Guyot-Dessaigne	Keeper of the Seals, Minister of Justice	Radical Left	25 October 1906	31 December 1907	Clemenceau I	
Aristide Briand	Keeper of the Seals, Minister of Justice	SI	4 January 1908	24 July 1909	Clemenceau I	
Louis Barthou	Keeper of the Seals, Minister of Justice	ARD	24 July 1909	3 November 1910	Briand I	
Théodore Girard	Keeper of the Seals, Minister of Justice	Non-Attached	3 November 1910	2 March 1911	Briand II	
Antoine Perrier	Keeper of the Seals, Minister of Justice	ARD	2 March 1911	27 June 1911	Monis	
Jean Cruppi	Keeper of the Seals, Minister of Justice	PRRRS	27 June 1911	14 January 1912	Caillaux	
Aristide Briand	Keeper of the Seals, Minister of Justice	PRS	14 January 1912	21 January 1913	Poincaré I	
Louis Barthou	Keeper of the Seals, Minister of Justice	PRD	21 January 1913	18 February 1913	Briand III	
Presidency of Raymond Poincaré
Louis Barthou	Keeper of the Seals, Minister of Justice	PRD	18 February 1913	22 March 1913	Briand IV	
Antony Ratier	Keeper of the Seals, Minister of Justice	PRD	22 March 1913	9 December 1913	Barthou	
Jean-Baptiste Bienvenu-Martin	Keeper of the Seals, Minister of Justice	PRRRS	9 December 1913	9 June 1914	Doumergue I	
Alexandre Ribot	Keeper of the Seals, Minister of Justice	FR	9 June 1914	13 June 1914	Ribot IV	
Jean-Baptiste Bienvenu-Martin	Keeper of the Seals, Minister of Justice	PRRRS	13 June 1914	26 August 1914	Viviani I	
Aristide Briand	Keeper of the Seals, Minister of Justice	PRS	26 August 1914	29 October 1915	Viviani II	
René Viviani	Keeper of the Seals, Minister of Justice	PRS	29 October 1915	12 September 1917	Briand V Briand VI; Ribot V	
Raoul Péret	Keeper of the Seals, Minister of Justice	ARD	12 September 1917	16 November 1917	Painlevé I	
Louis Nail	Keeper of the Seals, Minister of Justice	PRRRS	16 November 1917	20 January 1920	Clemenceau II	
Gustave Lhopiteau	Keeper of the Seals, Minister of Justice	RI	20 January 1920	18 February 1920	Millerand I	
Presidency of Paul Deschanel
Gustave Lhopiteau	Keeper of the Seals, Minister of Justice	RI	18 February 1920	23 September 1920	Millerand II	
Presidency of Alexandre Millerand
Gustave Lhopiteau	Keeper of the Seals, Minister of Justice	RI	24 September 1920	16 January 1921	Leygues	
Laurent Bonnevay	Keeper of the Seals, Minister of Justice	FR	16 January 1921	15 January 1922	Briand VII	
Louis Barthou	Keeper of the Seals, Minister of Justice	PRDS	15 January 1922	5 October 1922	Poincaré II	
Maurice Colrat	Keeper of the Seals, Minister of Justice	PRDS	5 October 1922	29 March 1924	Poincaré II	
Edmond Lefebvre du Prey	Keeper of the Seals, Minister of Justice	FR	29 March 1924	9 June 1924	Poincaré III	
Antony Ratier	Keeper of the Seals, Minister of Justice	PRDS	9 June 1924	14 June 1924	François-Marsal	
Presidency of Gaston Doumergue
René Renoult	Keeper of the Seals, Minister of Justice	PRRRS	14 June 1924	17 April 1925	Herriot I	
Théodore Steeg	Keeper of the Seals, Minister of Justice	PRRRS	17 April 1925	11 October 1925	Painlevé II	
Anatole de Monzie	Keeper of the Seals, Minister of Justice	PRS	11 October 1925	29 October 1925	Painlevé II	
Camille Chautemps	Keeper of the Seals, Minister of Justice	PRRRS	29 October 1925	28 November 1925	Painlevé III	
René Renoult	Keeper of the Seals, Minister of Justice	PRRRS	28 November 1925	9 March 1926	Briand VIII	
Pierre Laval	Keeper of the Seals, Minister of Justice	SE	9 March 1926	19 July 1926	Briand IX; Briand X	
Maurice Colrat	Keeper of the Seals, Minister of Justice	PRDS	19 July 1926	23 July 1926	Herriot II	
Louis Barthou	Keeper of the Seals, Minister of Justice	AD	23 July 1926	3 November 1929	Poincaré IV; Poincaré V Briand XI	
Lucien Hubert	Keeper of the Seals, Minister of Justice	PRRRS	3 November 1929	21 February 1930	Tardieu I	
Théodore Steeg	Keeper of the Seals, Minister of Justice	PRRRS	21 February 1930	2 March 1930	Chautemps I	
Raoul Péret	Keeper of the Seals, Minister of Justice	RI	2 March 1930	17 November 1930	Tardieu II	
Henry Chéron	Keeper of the Seals, Minister of Justice	AD	17 November 1930	27 January 1931	Tardieu II; Steeg	
Léon Bérard	Keeper of the Seals, Minister of Justice	AD	27 January 1931	13 June 1931	Laval I	
Presidency of Paul Doumer
Léon Bérard	Keeper of the Seals, Minister of Justice	AD	13 June 1931	20 February 1932	Laval II; Laval III	
Paul Reynaud	Keeper of the Seals, Minister of Justice	AD	20 February 1932	3 June 1932	Tardieu III	
Presidency of Albert Lebrun
René Renoult	Keeper of the Seals, Minister of Justice	PRRRS	3 June 1932	18 December 1932	Herriot III	
Abel Gardey	Keeper of the Seals, Minister of Justice	PRRRS	18 December 1932	31 January 1933	Paul-Boncour	
Eugène Penancier	Keeper of the Seals, Minister of Justice	PRRRS	31 January 1933	26 October 1933	Daladier I	
Albert Dalimier	Keeper of the Seals, Minister of Justice	PRRRS	26 October 1933	26 November 1933	Sarraut I	
Eugène Raynaldy	Keeper of the Seals, Minister of Justice	AD	26 November 1933	27 January 1934	Chautemps II	
Eugène Penancier	Keeper of the Seals, Minister of Justice	PRRRS	30 January 1934	9 February 1934	Daladier II	
Henry Chéron	Keeper of the Seals, Minister of Justice	AD	9 February 1934	15 October 1934	Doumergue II	
Henry Lémery	Keeper of the Seals, Minister of Justice	Non-Attached	15 October 1934	8 November 1934	Doumergue II	
Georges Pernot	Keeper of the Seals, Minister of Justice	FR	8 November 1934	7 June 1935	Flandin I Bouisson	
Léon Bérard	Keeper of the Seals, Minister of Justice	AD	7 June 1935	24 January 1936	Laval IV	
Yvon Delbos	Keeper of the Seals, Minister of Justice	PRRRS	24 January 1936	4 June 1936	Sarraut II	
Marc Rucart	Keeper of the Seals, Minister of Justice	PRRRS	4 June 1936	22 June 1937	Blum I	
Vincent Auriol	Keeper of the Seals, Minister of Justice	SFIO	22 June 1937	18 January 1938	Chautemps III	
César Campinchi	Keeper of the Seals, Minister of Justice	PRRRS	18 January 1938	13 March 1938	Chautemps IV	
Marc Rucart	Keeper of the Seals, Minister of Justice	PRRRS	13 March 1938	10 April 1938	Blum II	
Paul Marchandeau	Keeper of the Seals, Minister of Justice	PRRRS	10 April 1938	1 November 1938	Daladier III	
Paul Reynaud	Keeper of the Seals, Minister of Justice	AD	1 November 1938	13 September 1939	Daladier III; Daladier IV	
Georges Bonnet	Keeper of the Seals, Minister of Justice	PRRRS	13 September 1939	21 March 1940	Daladier V	
Albert Sérol	Keeper of the Seals, Minister of Justice	SFIO	21 March 1940	16 June 1940	Reynaud	
Charles Frémicourt	Keeper of the Seals, Minister of Justice	SE	16 June 1940	12 July 1940	Pétain	

== Vichy France ==
List of Ministers of Justice of Vichy France
Minister	Titled	Party	Took office	Left office	Time in office	Government	Ref.
Raphaël Alibert	Keeper of the Seals and Minister of State for Justice	SE	12 July 1940	27 January 1941	199 days	Laval V Flandin II	
Joseph Barthélemy	Keeper of the Seals and Minister of State for Justice	SE	27 January 1941	26 March 1943	2 years, 58 days	Flandin II; Darlan; Laval VI	
Maurice Gabolde	Keeper of the Seals and Minister of State for Justice	SE	26 March 1943	20 August 1944	1 year, 147 days	Laval VI	

== Free France ==
- René Cassin, 24 September 1941 – 7 June 1943 (based in London)
- Jules Abadie, 7 June 1943 – 4 September 1943 (based in Algiers)
- François de Menthon, 4 September 1943 – 20 August 1944 (based in Algiers)

== Provisional Government of the French Republic ==
List of Ministers of Justice of the Provisional Government of the French Republic
Minister	Titled	Party	Took office	Left office	Time in office	Government	Ref.
François de Menthon	Keeper of the Seals	MRP	20 August 1944	30 May 1945	283 days	De Gaulle I	
Pierre-Henri Teitgen	Keeper of the Seals	MRP	30 May 1945	20 January 1946	1 year, 202 days	De Gaulle II	
Pierre-Henri Teitgen	Keeper of the Seals	MRP	20 January 1946	18 December 1946	1 year, 202 days	Gouin	
Paul Ramadier	Keeper of the Seals	SFIO	18 December 1946	21 January 1947	34 days	Blum III	

== Fourth Republic ==
List of Ministers of Justice of the French Fourth Republic
Minister	Titled	Party	Took office	Left office	Time in office	Government	Ref.
Presidency of Vincent Auriol
André Marie	Keeper of the Seals	PRV	22 January 1947	21 October 1947	1 year, 185 days	Ramadier I	
André Marie	Keeper of the Seals	PRV	21 October 1947	19 November 1947	1 year, 185 days	Ramadier II	
André Marie	Keeper of the Seals	PRV	24 November 1947	25 July 1948	1 year, 185 days	Schuman I	
Robert Lecourt	Keeper of the Seals	MRP	26 July 1948	28 August 1948	43 days	Marie	
Robert Lecourt	Keeper of the Seals	MRP	5 September 1948	7 September 1948	43 days	Schuman II	
André Marie	Vice-President of the Council and Keeper of the Seals	PRV	11 September 1948	12 February 1949	154 days	Queuille I	
Robert Lecourt	Vice-President of the Council and Keeper of the Seals	MRP	13 February 1949	27 October 1949	256 days	Queuille I	
René Mayer	Keeper of the Seals	PRV	28 October 1949	7 February 1950	1 year, 255 days	Bidault II	
René Mayer	Keeper of the Seals	PRV	7 February 1950	24 June 1950	1 year, 255 days	Bidault III	
René Mayer	Minister of Justice	PRV	2 July 1950	4 July 1950	1 year, 255 days	Queuille II	
René Mayer	Minister of Justice	PRV	12 July 1950	21 February 1951	1 year, 255 days	Pleven I	
René Mayer	Minister of Justice	PRV	10 March 1951	10 July 1951	1 year, 255 days	Queuille III	
Edgar Faure	Minister of Justice	PRV	11 August 1951	19 January 1952	161 days	Pleven II	
Léon Martinaud-Déplat	Minister of Justice	PRV	20 January 1952	28 February 1952	1 year, 158 days	Faure I	
Léon Martinaud-Déplat	Minister of Justice	PRV	8 March 1952	23 December 1952	1 year, 158 days	Pinay	
Léon Martinaud-Déplat	Minister of Justice	PRV	8 January 1953	27 June 1953	1 year, 158 days	Mayer	
Paul Ribeyre	Minister of Justice	CNIP	28 June 1953	16 January 1954	202 days	Laniel I	
Presidency of René Coty
Paul Ribeyre	Minister of Justice	CNIP	16 January 1954	18 June 1954	153 days (Total: 355 days)	Laniel II	
Émile Hugues	Minister of Justice	PRV	19 June 1954	2 September 1954	75 days	Mendès France	
Jean-Michel Guérin de Beaumont	Minister of Justice	CNIP	3 September 1954	20 January 1955	139 days	Mendès France	
Emmanuel Temple	Minister of Justice	CNIP	20 January 1955	22 February 1955	33 days	Mendès France	
Robert Schuman	Minister of Justice	MRP	23 February 1955	31 January 1956	342 days	Faure II	
François Mitterrand	Minister of State, Responsible for Justice	UDSR	1 February 1956	12 June 1957	1 year, 131 days	Mollet	
Édouard Corniglion-Molinier	Minister of Justice	RS	13 June 1957	5 November 1957	145 days	Bourgès-Maunoury	
Robert Lecourt	Minister of Justice	MRP	6 November 1957	15 April 1958	207 days	Gaillard	
Robert Lecourt	Minister of Justice	MRP	13 May 1958	1 June 1958	207 days	Pflimlin	
Michel Debré	Keeper of the Seals, Minister of Justice	RS then UNR	1 June 1958	8 January 1959	221 days	De Gaulle III	

== Fifth Republic ==
List of Ministers of Justice of the French Fifth Republic
Minister	Titled	Party	Took office	Left office	Time in office	Government	Ref.
Presidency of Charles de Gaulle
Edmond Michelet	Keeper of the Seals, Minister of Justice	UNR	8 January 1959	24 August 1961	2 years, 228 days	Debré	
Bernard Chenot	Keeper of the Seals, Minister of Justice	UNR	24 August 1961	14 April 1962	233 days	Debré	
Jean Foyer	Keeper of the Seals, Minister of Justice	UNR then UDR	15 April 1962	28 November 1962	4 years, 351 days	Pompidou I	
Jean Foyer	Keeper of the Seals, Minister of Justice	UNR then UDR	6 December 1962	8 January 1966	4 years, 351 days	Pompidou II	
Jean Foyer	Keeper of the Seals, Minister of Justice	UNR then UDR	8 January 1966	1 April 1967	4 years, 351 days	Pompidou III	
Louis Joxe	Keeper of the Seals, Minister of Justice	UDR	7 April 1967	31 May 1968	1 year, 54 days	Pompidou IV	
René Capitant	Keeper of the Seals, Minister of Justice	UDR	31 May 1968	10 July 1968	332 days	Pompidou IV	
René Capitant	Keeper of the Seals, Minister of Justice	UDR	12 July 1968	28 April 1969	332 days	Couve de Murville	
Interim Presidency of Alain Poher
Jean-Marcel Jeanneney	Keeper of the Seals, Minister of Justice (interim)	UDR	28 April 1969	20 June 1969	53 days	Couve de Murville	
Presidency of Georges Pompidou
René Pleven	Keeper of the Seals, Minister of Justice	CDP	22 June 1969	5 July 1972	3 years, 266 days	Chaban-Delmas	
René Pleven	Keeper of the Seals, Minister of Justice	CDP	6 July 1972	15 March 1973	3 years, 266 days	Messmer I	
Jean Taittinger	Keeper of the Seals, Minister of Justice	UDR	5 April 1973	27 February 1974	1 year, 52 days	Messmer II	
Jean Taittinger	Minister of the State, Keeper of the Seals, Minister of Justice	UDR	1 March 1974	27 May 1974	1 year, 52 days	Messmer III	
Presidency of Valéry Giscard d'Estaing
Jean Lecanuet	Keeper of the Seals, Minister of Justice	CD	28 May 1974	12 January 1976	2 years, 89 days	Chirac I	
Jean Lecanuet	Minister of the State, Keeper of the Seals, Minister of Justice	CD	12 January 1976	25 August 1976	2 years, 89 days	Chirac I	
Olivier Guichard	Minister of the State, Keeper of the Seals, Minister of Justice	UDR then RPR	27 August 1976	29 March 1977	214 days	Barre I	
Alain Peyrefitte	Keeper of the Seals, Minister of Justice	RPR	30 March 1977	31 March 1978	4 years, 44 days	Barre II	
Alain Peyrefitte	Keeper of the Seals, Minister of Justice	RPR	5 April 1978	13 May 1981	4 years, 44 days	Barre III	
Presidency of François Mitterrand
Maurice Faure	Keeper of the Seals, Minister of Justice	MRG	22 May 1981	22 June 1981	31 days	Mauroy I	
Robert Badinter	Keeper of the Seals, Minister of Justice	PS	23 June 1981	22 March 1983	4 years, 241 days	Mauroy II	
Robert Badinter	Keeper of the Seals, Minister of Justice	PS	22 March 1983	17 July 1984	4 years, 241 days	Mauroy III	
Robert Badinter	Keeper of the Seals, Minister of Justice	PS	19 July 1984	19 February 1986	4 years, 241 days	Fabius	
Michel Crépeau	Keeper of the Seals, Minister of Justice	MRG	19 February 1986	20 March 1986	29 days	Fabius	
Albin Chalandon	Keeper of the Seals, Minister of Justice	RPR	20 March 1986	10 May 1988	2 years, 51 days	Chirac II	
Pierre Arpaillange	Keeper of the Seals, Minister of Justice	DVG	12 May 1988	23 June 1988	2 years, 143 days	Rocard I	
Pierre Arpaillange	Keeper of the Seals, Minister of Justice	DVG	28 June 1988	2 October 1990	2 years, 143 days	Rocard II	
Henri Nallet	Keeper of the Seals, Minister of Justice	PS	2 October 1990	15 May 1991	1 year, 183 days	Rocard II	
Henri Nallet	Keeper of the Seals, Minister of Justice	PS	16 May 1991	2 April 1992	1 year, 183 days	Cresson	
Michel Vauzelle	Keeper of the Seals, Minister of Justice	PS	2 April 1992	29 March 1993	361 days	Bérégovoy	
Pierre Méhaignerie	Minister of the State, Keeper of the Seals, Minister of Justice	UDF-CDS	30 March 1993	11 May 1995	2 years, 42 days	Balladur	
Presidency of Jacques Chirac
Jacques Toubon	Keeper of the Seals, Minister of Justice	RPR	18 May 1995	7 November 1995	2 years, 15 days	Juppé I	
Jacques Toubon	Keeper of the Seals, Minister of Justice	RPR	7 November 1995	2 June 1997	2 years, 15 days	Juppé II	
Élisabeth Guigou	Keeper of the Seals, Minister of Justice	PS	4 June 1997	18 October 2000	3 years, 136 days	Jospin	
Marylise Lebranchu	Keeper of the Seals, Minister of Justice	PS	18 October 2000	6 May 2002	1 year, 200 days	Jospin	
Dominique Perben	Keeper of the Seals, Minister of Justice	RPR then UMP	7 May 2002	17 June 2002	3 years, 24 days	Raffarin I	
Dominique Perben	Keeper of the Seals, Minister of Justice	RPR then UMP	17 June 2002	22 January 2004	3 years, 24 days	Raffarin II	
Dominique Perben	Keeper of the Seals, Minister of Justice	RPR then UMP	22 January 2004	31 May 2005	3 years, 24 days	Raffarin III	
Pascal Clément	Keeper of the Seals, Minister of Justice	UMP	2 June 2005	15 May 2007	1 year, 347 days	Villepin	
Presidency of Nicolas Sarkozy
Rachida Dati	Keeper of the Seals, Minister of Justice	UMP	18 May 2007	18 June 2007	2 years, 36 days	Fillon I	
Rachida Dati	Keeper of the Seals, Minister of Justice	UMP	19 June 2007	23 June 2009	2 years, 36 days	Fillon II	
Michèle Alliot-Marie	Keeper of the Seals, Minister of Justice and Liberties	UMP	23 June 2009	13 November 2010	1 year, 143 days	Fillon II	
Michel Mercier	Keeper of the Seals, Minister of Justice and Liberties	DVD	14 November 2010	10 May 2012	1 year, 178 days	Fillon III	
Presidency of François Hollande
Christiane Taubira	Keeper of the Seals, Minister of Justice	DVG	16 May 2012	18 June 2012	3 years, 256 days	Ayrault I	
Christiane Taubira	Keeper of the Seals, Minister of Justice	DVG	21 June 2012	31 March 2014	3 years, 256 days	Ayrault II	
Christiane Taubira	Keeper of the Seals, Minister of Justice	DVG	2 April 2014	25 August 2014	3 years, 256 days	Valls I	
Christiane Taubira	Keeper of the Seals, Minister of Justice	DVG	26 August 2014	27 January 2016	3 years, 256 days	Valls II	
Jean-Jacques Urvoas	Keeper of the Seals, Minister of Justice	PS	27 January 2016	6 December 2016	1 year, 110 days	Valls II	
Jean-Jacques Urvoas	Keeper of the Seals, Minister of Justice	PS	6 December 2016	17 May 2017	1 year, 110 days	Cazeneuve	
Presidency of Emmanuel Macron
François Bayrou	Minister of the State, Keeper of the Seals, Minister of Justice	MoDem	17 May 2017	21 June 2017	35 days	Philippe I	
Nicole Belloubet	Keeper of the Seals, Minister of Justice	DVG	21 June 2017	6 July 2020	3 years, 15 days	Philippe II	
Éric Dupond-Moretti	Keeper of the Seals, Minister of Justice	DVG	6 July 2020	16 May 2022	4 years, 77 days	Castex	
Éric Dupond-Moretti	Keeper of the Seals, Minister of Justice	DVG	20 May 2022	11 January 2024	4 years, 77 days	Borne	
Éric Dupond-Moretti	Keeper of the Seals, Minister of Justice	DVG	11 January 2024	21 September 2024	4 years, 77 days	Attal	
Didier Migaud	Keeper of the Seals, Minister of Justice	PS	21 September 2024	23 December 2024	93 days	Barnier	
Gérald Darmanin	Keeper of the Seals, Minister of Justice	RE	23 December 2024	Present	1 year, 184 days	Bayrou; Lecornu I Lecornu II	

== See also ==
- Grand Chancellor of France
