= Abbatucci =

Abbatucci is a surname of Corsican and Italian origin, especially from Zicavo. Notable people with the surname include:

- Jacques Pierre Abbatucci (military officer) (1723–1813), Corsican officer
- Jacques Pierre Abbatucci (politician) (1791–1857) Corsican-born French politician
- Jean Charles Abbatucci (1770–1796), Corsican-born French general
- Jean-Charles Abbatucci (politician) (1816–1885), Corsican politician
