= Second cabinet of Albert de Broglie =

57th cabinet of France

Cabinet de Broglie II
- 57th Cabinet of France

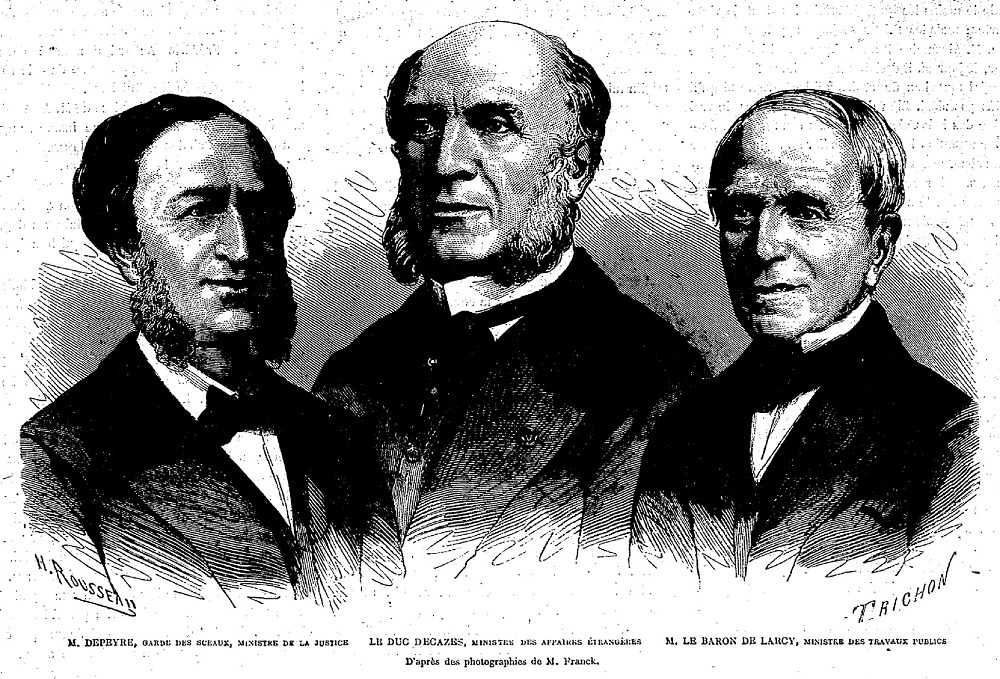
- Date formed: 26 November 1873
- Date dissolved: 22 May 1874

People and organisations
- President: Patrice de MacMahon
- Head of government: Albert de Broglie
- Member parties: Legitimists; Orléanists; Bonapartists
- Status in legislature: Majority (Note: Complementary elections of 2 July 1871.) 390 / 759 (51%)
- Opposition parties: Opportunists; Liberals; Radicals

History
- Election: 1871 legislative election
- Predecessor: de Broglie I
- Successor: de Cissey

The Second Cabinet of Albert de Broglie is the 57th cabinet of France and the fifth of the Third Republic, seating from 26 November 1873 to 22 May 1874, headed by Albert de Broglie as Vice-President of the Council of Ministers and Minister of Interior, under the presidency of Patrice de MacMahon.

== History ==
The cabinet was formed on 26 November 1873, following the approval of the septennate by the National Assembly. Albert de Broglie stayed head of government, but exchanged his position of Minister of Foreign Affairs with the one of Minister of Interior.

In many ways this government was a reshuffle. Monarchists ministers displeased by the fact that a King would not be restored soon resigned. de Broglie faced opposition by the Legitimists that signified they would not help him this time. With the intervention of MacMahon, a new cabinet was secured and new ministers were appointed, notably Roger de Larcy, who was minister under the republican Jules Dufaure.

Four new Undersecretaries of State were appointed, while only one or two were called under previous administrations; the nomination of an Undersecretary of State for the Ministry of Public Instruction was particularly consistent with the cabinet's policy. Indeed, de Broglie, pursued the Ordre Moral started with his first cabinet.

A turning point of the government was a bill introduced in the Assembly in January 1874 that would put appointments of certain officials in the hands of the Minister of Interior or its subordinates, the prefects. The bill was initially defeated by a vote of Legitimists realizing the consequences of the septennate voted in November 1873; MacMahon, as president, would keep his place until 1880, making it less than likely an early restoration. This led to de Broglie to offer his resignation, but the president refused it. The government survived a vote of no confidence and secured a vote for the bill that finally passed the Assembly.

The cabinet was dissolved on 22 May 1874 with the withdrawal of the Legitimists. It was replaced when Ernest Courtot de Cissey, former Minister of War under Jules Dufaure was called to form a new government.

== Composition ==
Vice-President of the Council of Ministers : Albert de Broglie
Portfolio (Note: Order of the list corresponds to the order of appointment.)	Name	Took office	Left office	Party	Ref.
Minister of Interior	Albert de Broglie	26 November 1873	22 May 1874	Orleanist	
Minister of Justice	Octave Depeyre	26 November 1873	22 May 1874	Legitimist	
Minister of Foreign Affairs	Louis Decazes	26 November 1873	22 May 1874	Orleanist	
Minister of Finance	Pierre Magne	26 November 1873	22 May 1874	Orleanist	
Minister of War	François du Barail	26 November 1873	22 May 1874	Bonapartist	
Minister of Navy and Colonies	Charles de Dompierre d'Hornoy	26 November 1873	22 May 1874	Legitimist	
Minister of Public Instruction	Oscar Bardi de Fourtou	26 November 1873	22 May 1874	Center-right	
Minister of Public Works	Roger de Larcy	26 November 1873	22 May 1874	Legitimist	
Minister of Agriculture	Alfred Deseilligny	26 November 1873	22 May 1874	Orleanist	
Undersecretary of State for the Ministry of Interior	Pierre Baragnon	26 November 1873	22 May 1874	Legitimist	
Undersecretary of State for the Ministry of Justice	Ambroise Vente	27 November 1873	22 May 1874	Center-right	
Undersecretary of State for the Ministry of Finance	Léon Lefébure	27 November 1873	22 May 1874	Center-right	
Undersecretary of State for the Ministry of Public Instruction	Albert Desjardins	27 November 1873	22 May 1874	Center-right	
