= Jacques Pierre Abbatucci =

Jacques Pierre Abbatucci may refer to:

- Jacques Pierre Abbatucci (military officer) (1723–1813), Corsican military officer
- Jacques Pierre Abbatucci (politician) (1791–1857), French politician
