= Charles Giraud =

French lawyer and politician

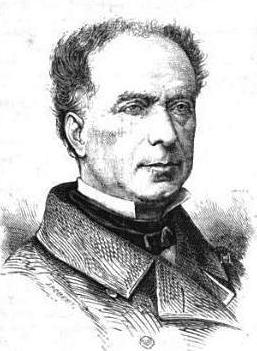
- Portrait of Giraud, 1865
- Born: Charles Joseph Barthélémy Giraud; 20 February 1802; Pernes-les-Fontaines, France
- Died: 13 July 1881 (aged 79); Paris, France
- Occupations: Lawyer, politician
- Known for: Minister of Education

Charles Joseph Barthélémy Giraud (20 February 1802 – 13 July 1881) was a French lawyer and politician. He was twice Minister of Education during the French Second Republic.

== Early years ==
Charles Joseph Barthélémy Giraud was born on 20 February 1802 at Pernes-les-Fontaines, Vaucluse, France. He studied law at Aix-en-Provence, and became professor of administrative science and president of the academy. In 1842 he was appointed inspector-general of the law schools in Paris, and then inspector-general of the board of education. He was vice rector of the Académie française until 1848.

== Political career ==
Giraud was Minister of Public Instruction in two cabinets in 1851, and was a member of the consultative council. On 26 October 1851 Eugène Corbin, procureur-général at Bourges, was appointed Minister of Justice to replace Eugène Rouher, whose resignation had been accepted. In the same decree Giraud was appointed Minister of Education and Religious Affairs, and was named interim Minister of Justice in Corbin's absence. Corbin did not accept the appointment. On 1 November 1851 Alfred Daviel was made Minister of Justice.

Giraud resigned from the consultative council in August 1852 after the confiscation of the property of the House of Orléans. He then became professor of Roman Law in the faculty of Paris. In 1861 he succeeded Laferriere as inspector general of the judiciary. He died in Paris on 13 July 1881, aged 79.

== Works ==
Giraud's works include:

- 1838 Recherches sur le droit de propriété chez les Romains, sous la république et sous l'empire 1 vol. (VI-331-70 p.) Aix Aubin
- 1845 Éloge de Schilter. Discours d'ouverture, prononcé le 6 août 1845, 31 p. Strasbourg impr. de Vve Berger-Levrault
- 1846 Histoire du droit francais au moyen age (2 vols., Paris, 1846);
- 1847 Le traite d' Utrecht (translated into German and Spanish);
- 1848 Notice sur Étienne Pasquier, 83 p. Paris impr. de P. Dupont
- 1850 De la situation de la dette publique en Espagne, 32 p. Paris Guillaumin et Cie
- 1852 Précis de l'ancien droit coutumier français, 84 p. Paris A. Durand
- 1856 Les tables de Salpensa et de Malaga, relating to the bronze tables found in the latter locality (2d ed., revised and enlarged, 1856)
- 1865 Histoire de la vie et des ouvrages de Saint-Evremond. 3 vol. (VII-CCCXCVI-194, 557, 444 p.) Paris J. Léon-Techener fils
- 1867 Des legs particuliers en droit romain et en droit français, 1 vol. (132 p.) Poitiers impr. de H. Oudin
- 1873 Novum enchiridion juris romani in quo continentur legum antiquarum, imprimis XII tabularum, necnon edicti praetorii, quae supersunt, Pauli sententiae, Ulpiani fragmenta varia, Gaii et Justiniani Institutiones... (II-687 p.) Parisiis apud Cotillon et filium
- 1873 Etudes nouvelles sur Gregoire VII. et son temps, in the Revue des Deux Mondes of March 15, 1873, et seq.
- 1875 Les bronzes d'Osuna, (108 p.) Paris Impr. nationale
- 1877 Les nouveaux bronzes d'Osuna, nouvelle édition, revue, corrigée et augmentée 1 vol. (61 p.) Paris Impr. nationale
- 1881 La maréchale de Villars et son temps (290 p.) Paris Impr. nationale
