= Moral order =

Moral order may refer to:

- The conservative and monarchic French government in the 1870s (French: Ordre moral) : Ordre Moral.
- Immanuel Kant's rendering of the metaphysical argument from morality.
- A social structure and transcendent moral code derived from natural law in the philosophy of traditionalist conservatism.
- Maat, the ancient Egyptian concept of a moral order or justice.

== See also ==
- Antinomianism
