= Montrell =

Montrell is a given name and surname. Notable people with the name include:

== Given name ==
- Montrell Craft (born 1987), American football player
- Montrell Darrett, American gospel music singer
- Montrell Johnson Jr. (born 2002), American football player
- Montrell Teague (born 1991), American harness racing driver
- Montrell Washington (born 1999), American football player

== Surname ==
- Brandon Montrell (1979–2022), American comedian
- Roy Montrell (1928–1979), American rhythm & blues guitarist

== See also ==
- Montrel Meander (born 1994), American football player
- Montrezl Harrell (born 1994), American basketball player
- Montell, given name and surname
