= Montel =

Montel is a given name and surname. Notable people with the name include:

== Given name ==
- Montel Vontavious Porter (born 1973), American professional wrestler
- Montel Williams (born 1956), American television personality and television/radio talk show host

== Surname ==
- Blanche Montel (1902–1998), French actress
- Éliane Montel (1898-1993), French physicist and chemist
- Eugène Montel (1880–1966), French politician
- Paul Montel (1876–1975), French mathematician

== See also ==
- Montell, given name and surname
