= Pontell =

Pontell is a surname. Notable people with the surname include:

- Henry Pontell (born 1950), American sociologist
- Jonathan Pontell (born 1950), American television director, producer, and editor

== See also ==
- Montell
