= Maurice Colrat =

French politician

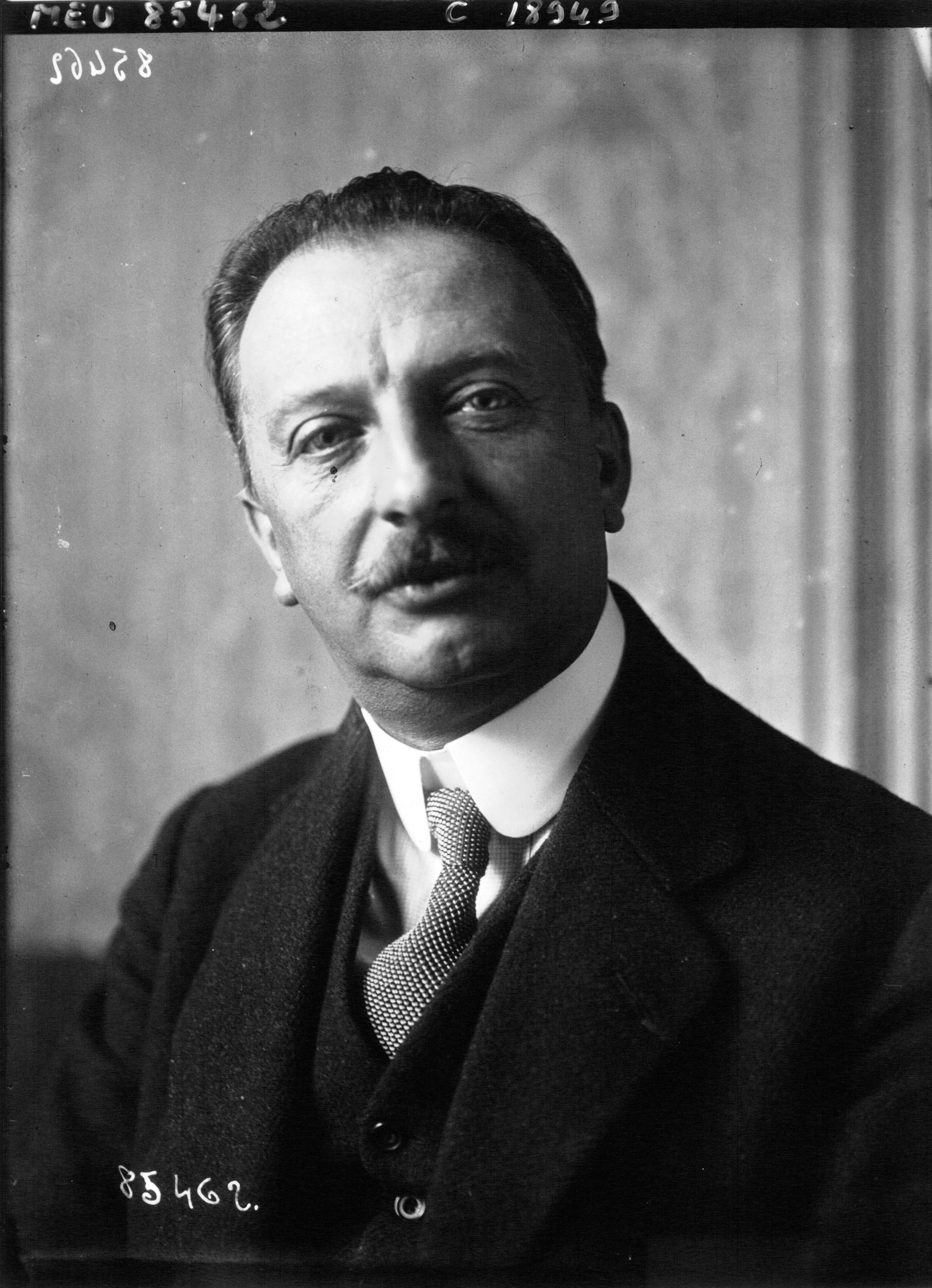
Colrat in 1920

Maurice Colrat de Montrozier (September 29, 1871 – March 5, 1954) was a French politician and founder of Democratic Republic Union.

== Early life ==
Colrat completed his secondary education at Rodez High School. He completed his undergraduate degree at Jesuit college at Rue de Vaugirard.

== Career ==
Maurice began his career as a secretary in Raymond Poincare's law office. He later did election work for the progressists, Poincare and Eugene Motte.

Colrat was the director of Democratic Republican Union in 1899 and Middle Class Association in 1909. In 1910, he became the director of the newspaper L'Opinion. During the first world war Colrat served at Central Staff while continuing to direct L'Opinion.

After his electoral defeat in 1928, he resumed his job as a journalist at L'Opinion and many other magazines. He died on March 4, 1954, in his Paris apartment on Avenue Bugeaud.
