= Philippe-Antoine Merlin de Douai =

French politician and lawyer (1754–1838)

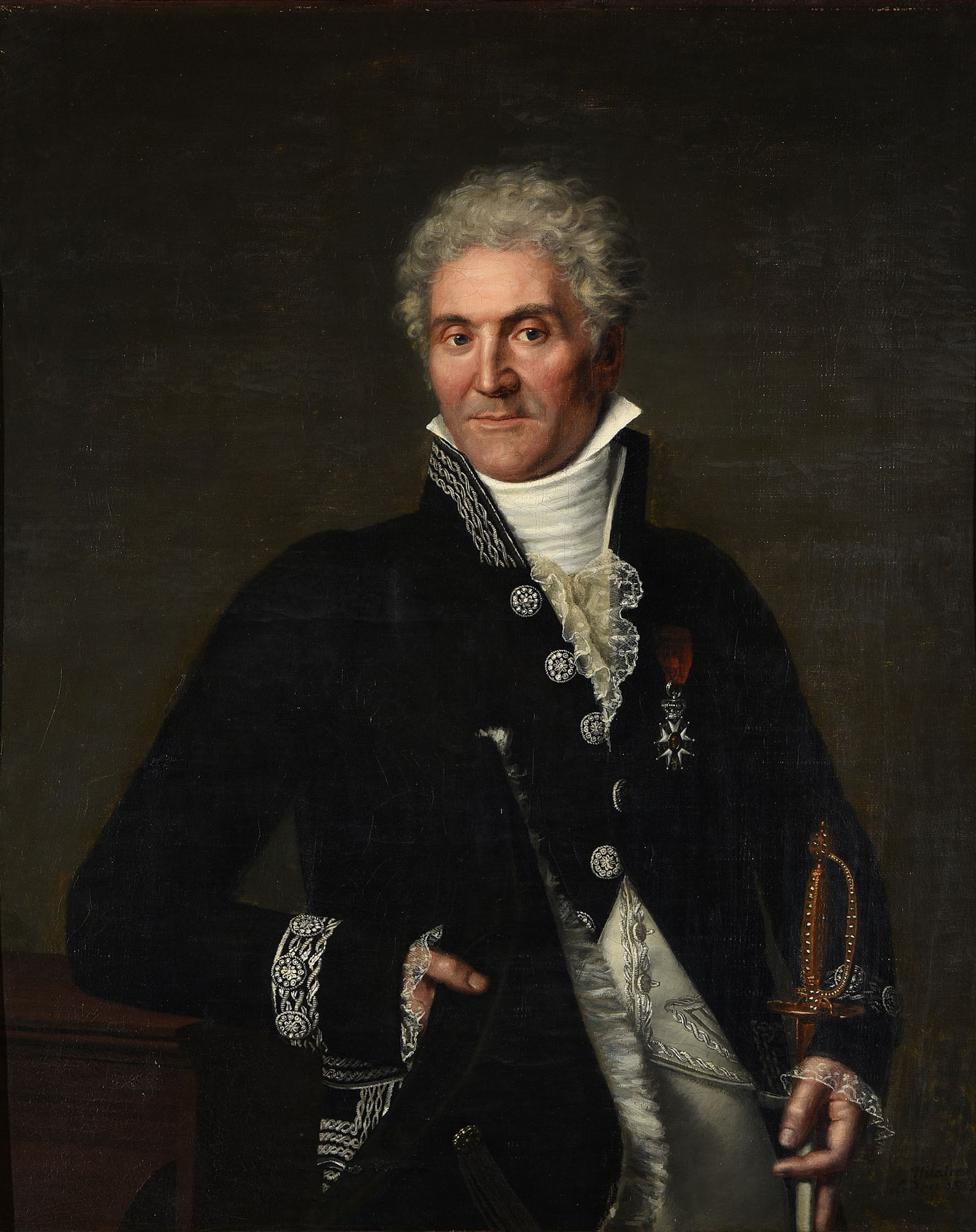
- Portrait by Hilaire Ledru, 1812

President of the Directory
- In office 26 May 1799 – 18 June 1799
- Preceded by: Paul Barras
- Succeeded by: Emmanuel-Joseph Sieyès
- In office 25 February 1798 – 26 May 1798
- Preceded by: Paul Barras
- Succeeded by: Jean-François Reubell

Member of the Directory
- In office 4 September 1797 – 18 July 1799
- Preceded by: Lazare Carnot
- Succeeded by: Jean-François Moulin

48th President of the National Convention
- In office 3 August 1794 – 18 August 1794
- Preceded by: Jean-Marie Collot d'Herbois
- Succeeded by: Antoine Merlin de Thionville

Member of the National Convention
- In office 21 September 1792 – 26 October 1795
- Constituency: Nord
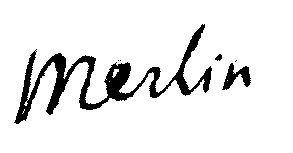
- Signature

Philippe-Antoine Merlin, known as Merlin de Douai (French pronunciation: [filip ɑ̃twan mɛʁlɛ̃ də dwɛ], 30 October 1754 – 26 December 1838), was a French politician and lawyer.

== Early life ==
Merlin de Douai was born at Arleux, Nord, and was called to the Flemish bar association in 1775. He collaborated in the Répertoire de jurisprudence, the later editions of which appeared under Merlin's superintendence, and contributed to other important legal compilations. In 1782, he purchased a position as royal secretary at the chancellery of the Flanders parlement. His reputation spread to Paris, and he was consulted by leading magistrates. The Duke of Orléans selected him to be a member of his privy council.

As an elected member of the States-General for the Third Estate in Douai, he was one of the chief of those who applied the principles of liberty and equality embodied in the National Constituent Assembly's Tennis Court Oath of 20 June 1789.

== Career ==
On behalf of the committee, appointed to deal with the Ancien Régime’s nobility rights, Merlin de Douai presented to the Assembly reports on manorialism and the subjects of redistribution with compensation, and topics associated with them (hunting and fishing rights, forestry etc.). He carried legislation for the abolition of primogeniture and secured equality of inheritance between relatives of the same degree and between men and women. He also prepared the report for the Assembly that argued that no compensation should be paid to the German princes whose lands in Alsace were forfeit when France incorporated them.

His numerous reports were supplemented by popular exposition of current legislation in the Journal de legislation. On the dissolution of the Assembly, he became judge of the criminal court at Douai.

=== National Convention ===
Although not always an advocate of violent measures, as a deputy to the National Convention in The Mountain, Merlin de Douai voted for the execution of King Louis XVI. Later, as a member of the council of legislation, he presented to the Convention the Law of Suspects (17 September 1793), permitting the detention of suspects, (a document backed by Georges Couthon and Maximilien Robespierre). He exercised missions in his native region and accused General Charles François Dumouriez of having betrayed the country during the Campaign of the Low Countries (after the Battle of Neerwinden).

Merlin de Douai was closely allied with his namesake Merlin of Thionville and, after the start of the Thermidorian Reaction, which brought about the fall of Robespierre in 1794, became president of the Convention and a member of the Committee of Public Safety. His efforts were primarily directed to the prevention of any new gathering of powers by the Jacobin Club, the Commune and the Revolutionary Tribunal.

Merlin de Douai convinced the Committee of Public Safety to agree with the closing of the Jacobin Club on the grounds that it was an administrative, rather than a legislative, measure. Merlin de Douai recommended the readmission of the survivors of the Girondin party to the Convention and drew up a law limiting the right of insurrection. He also had a considerable share in the foreign policy of the French Republic.

Merlin de Douai had been commissioned in April 1794 to report on the civil and criminal legislation of France, and, after eighteen months work, he produced the Rapport et projet de code des délits et des peines (10 Vendémiaire, an IV). Merlin's code abolished confiscation, branding and life imprisonment and was based chiefly on the penal code that had been drawn up in September 1791.

=== Directory ===
He was made Minister of Justice (30 October 1795) and later Minister of the General Police (2 January 1796) under the Directory, before moving back to the Justice Ministry (3 April 1796) keeping tight surveillance of the Royalist émigrés. After the coup d'état known as 18 Fructidor, he became one of the five Directors on 5 September 1797. He was accused of the bankruptcy and various other failures of the government and was forced to retire into private life during the Coup of 30 Prairial VII on 18 June 1799.

=== Consulate and Empire ===
Merlin de Douai had no share in Napoleon Bonaparte's 18 Brumaire coup. Under the Consulate, Merlin de Douai accepted a minor position in the Cour de cassation, where he soon became procureur-général (Attorney General). Although he had no share in drawing up the Napoleonic Code, he was very involved in matters regarding its application. He became a member of the Conseil d'État, Count of the Empire, and Grand Officier de la Légion d'honneur.

=== Exile and July Monarchy ===
Having resumed his functions during the Hundred Days, he was one of those banished on the Second Bourbon Restoration.

The years of his exile were devoted to his Répertoire de jurisprudence (5th ed., 18 vols., Paris, 1827–1828) and to his Recueil alphabétique des questions de droit (4th ed., 8 vols., Paris, 1827–1828). At the 1830 July Revolution, he returned to France and re-entered the Institut de France, of which he had been an original member. He was admitted to the Academy of Political and Moral Sciences by the July Monarchy. He died in Paris in 1838 at the age of 84.

== Personal life ==
Merlin de Douai's son, Antoine François Eugène Merlin (1778–1854), was a well-known general in the French Revolutionary Army and served in most of the Napoleonic Wars.

== Bibliography ==
- Moyen de subvenir promptement aux besoins de l'État, & singulierement au remboursement du prix des offices dont la vénalité est supprimée, 1789
- Rapport fait au Comité des droits féodaux, le 4 septembre 1789, sur l'objet & l'ordre du travail dont il est chargé, 1789
- Recueil général de jurisprudence françoise, 1790
- Opinion de M. Merlin sur la nécessité de rendre le Tribunal de Cassation sédentaire, 1790
- Rapport fait à l'Assemblée nationale au nom du comité de féodalité le 8 février 1790, 1790
- Opinion de Philippe-Antoine Merlin ... sur le procès de Louis XVI, 1793
- Projet de décret, présenté au nom du Comité de législation, par Ph. Ante. Merlin (de Douay), sur la manière de faire le procès aux fonctionnaires prévenus de malversations relatives aux biens nationaux, 1793
- Pieces justificatives a joindre au rapport du citoyen Merlin de Douai, sur l'affaire des citoyens Sanguin, 1794
- Ph. Ant. Merlin, membre de l'Institut national, au Conseil des cinq-cents, 1798

== See also ==
- Pierre Marie François Ogé Sculptor of bust

== Sources ==
- In turn, it gives the following reference:
  - François Auguste Alexis Mignet, Portraits et notices historiques (1852), vol. I

Political offices
Preceded by Louis Gohier	Minister of Justice; 1795–1796	Succeeded by Jean Joseph Victor Génissieu
Preceded by Jean Joseph Victor Génissieu	Minister of Justice; 1796–1797	Succeeded by Charles Joseph Lambrechts
