= Jean-Charles Abbatucci (politician) =

Corsican lawyer and politician (1816–1885)

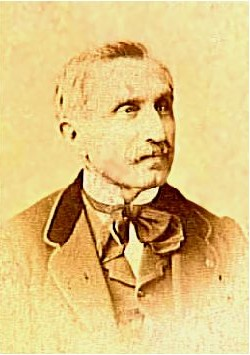

Deputy of Corsica
- In office 13 May 1849 – 2 December 1851

Representative of Corsica
- In office 9 June 1872 – 7 March 1876

Deputy of Corsica
- In office 14 October 1877 – 27 October 1881

Personal details
- Born: 25 March 1816 Zicavo, Corsica, France
- Died: 29 January 1885 (aged 68) Paris, France
- Occupation: Lawyer and politician

Jean-Charles Abbatucci (25 March 1816 – 29 January 1885) was a Corsican lawyer and politician who was a Deputy for Corsica during both the French Second Republic and the French Third Republic. He was a committed Bonapartist throughout his political career.

== Early years (1816–48) ==
Jean-Charles Abbatucci was born on 25 March 1816 in Zicavo, Corsica. He was the eldest son of Jacques Pierre Charles Abbatucci (1791–1857), a member of the Chamber of Deputies during the July Monarchy and a representative of the people at the Constituent Assembly of 1848 and the Legislative Assembly of 1849. Jean-Charles Abbatucci became an advocate in Orléans. He was involved in politics from an early age. He attended the reformist banquet in 1847 in Orléans with Pierre Marie and Adolphe Crémieux.

== Second Republic (1848–51) ==
When Crémieux became minister of justice during the French Second Republic (1948–51) one of his first acts was to appoint Abbatucci substitute of the Attorney General in Paris. Charles Abbatucci was elected a deputy for Corsica in the National Legislative Assembly from 13 May 1849 to 2 December 1851 and joined the Bonapartist parliamentary group. In the same election his father was elected for Loiret. Charles Abbatucci supported the Bonapartist party from the start in words and deeds. He mixed with the editorial staff of the Elysée newspapers and with the Bonapartist committees in Paris and the departments, and recruited members.

== Second Empire (1852–70) ==
After the coup d'état of 2 December 1851 Abbatucci 's father was Minister of Justice from 1852 to 1857. His father was made a senator and his brother Séverin Paul Abbatucci^{(fr)} was a deputy throughout the Second French Empire. Abbatucci became his father's chief of staff at the Ministry of Justice, and was appointed Master of Requests (maître des requêtes) at the Council of State in 1852. He became a councilor of state in 1857, holding this position until 1873. He was made an Officer of the Legion of Honour on 13 August 1861.

== Third Republic (1871–89) ==
During the French Third Republic Abbatucci ran for Corsica in a legislative by-election on 9 June 1872 to replace Charles Étienne Conti^{(fr)}, who had died in office. He campaigned on an openly Bonapartist platform and was elected by 30,323 out of 45,020 votes. He was a member of the National Assembly from 9 June 1872 to 7 March 1876, and sat with the Bonapartist Appel au peuple group. He voted, like them, with the majority of the right. He voted for the cabinet of Albert de Broglie on 16 May 1874, and on 23 July 1874 voted against the proposal of Jean Casimir-Perier on the organization of public authorities. On 29 July 1874 he voted for the Maleville proposal to dissolve the Assembly. On 25 February 1875 he voted against the constitution, which defined the republican form of government.

Abbatucci was narrowly defeated in the 20 February 1876 elections for the Sartène district, losing to François Marie Bartoli.^{(fr)} After the House had been dissolved in 1877 he was the official candidate of the government, and easily won the election of 14 October 1877 against Bartoli. There were protests about the election concerning administrative pressure and other irregularities, but the deputy Adrien Joseph Prax-Paris reported that it was valid on 20 March 1879. Abbatucci remained with the Appel au peuple parliamentary group. He was not reelected on 21 April 1881. Jean-Charles Abbatucci died on 29 January 1885 in Paris.

== Sources ==
- Jean-Charles Abbatucci (in French), Assemblée nationale
- Robert, Adolphe; Cougny, Gaston (1889–1891), "ABBATUCCI (JEAN-CHARLES)", in Edgar Bourloton (ed.), Dictionnaire des Parlementaires français (1789–1889) (in French)
- Wilson, Stephen (2003-10-30), Feuding, Conflict and Banditry in Nineteenth-Century Corsica, Cambridge University Press, ISBN 978-0-521-52264-9
