= Maxime Tandonnet =

French civil servant and writer (1958–2024)

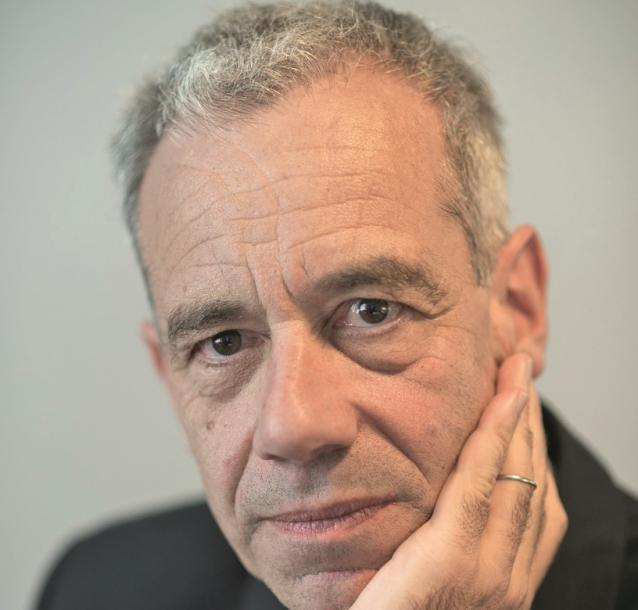
- Tandonnet in 2016

Subprefect of the Arrondissement of Saint-Jean-de-Maurienne
- In office 1994–1996
- Preceded by: Jean-François Delage
- Succeeded by: Frédéric Benet-chambellan

Private secretary of the Prefect of Yvelines
- In office 1993–1994
- Preceded by: Jérôme Gutton
- Succeeded by: Francis Vuibert

Private secretary of the Prefect of Indre-et-Loire
- In office 1992–1993
- Succeeded by: Patrick Buttin

Personal details
- Born: 7 October 1958 Caudéran, France (today Bordeaux, France)
- Died: 21 September 2024 (aged 65)
- Education: Institut d'études politiques de Bordeaux; École nationale d'administration
- Occupation: Civil servant Writer

Maxime Tandonnet (7 October 1958 – 21 September 2024) was a French civil servant and writer.

== Life and career ==
Born in Caudéran on 7 October 1958, Tandonnet graduated from the Institut d'études politiques de Bordeaux in 1979 and from the École nationale d'administration in 1992. After his military service in the French Navy, he was named as a secretary of foreign affairs at the Embassy of France in Sudan for two years. He then joined the directorate for French citizens abroad in North Africa and the Middle East. In 1992, the Minister of the Interior named him private secretary to Prefect of Indre-et-Loire and subsequently to Prefect of Yvelines Claude Érignac. In 2008, he was named a member of the Inspection générale de l'administration.

In 2007, Tandonnet became an advisor on immigration at the Élysée Palace, a post he held until 2011. He then resumed his duties as an inspector-general for the Minister of the Interior. The press lauded him as President Nicolas Sarkozy's main advisor on immigration, though he faced criticism for the proximity of his beliefs to those of the National Front. In addition to his administrative career, he regularly contributed to Le Figaro, Atlantico, Le Journal du Dimanche, and the Revue Politique et Parlementaire. He also became a guest instructor on immigration policy at Paris-East Créteil University in 2011.

Tandonnet died on 21 September 2024, at the age of 65.

== Publications ==
- Le Grand Bazar ou l'Europe face à l'immigration (2001)
- La Nouvelle Vague (2002)
- Le Défi de l'immigration (2003)
- Immigration: sortir du chaos (2006)
- Géopolitique des migrations: la crise des frontières (2007)
- 1940: un autre 11 novembre (2009)
- Histoire des présidents de la République (2013)
- Au cœur du volcan, Carnets de l'Elysée 2007–2012 (2014)
- Droit des étrangers et de l'accès à la nationalité (2016)
- Les parias de la République (2017)
- André Tardieu, l'incompris (2019)
- Georges Bidault: de la Résistance à l'Algérie française (2022)
