= Eugène Corbin =

French lawyer and politician

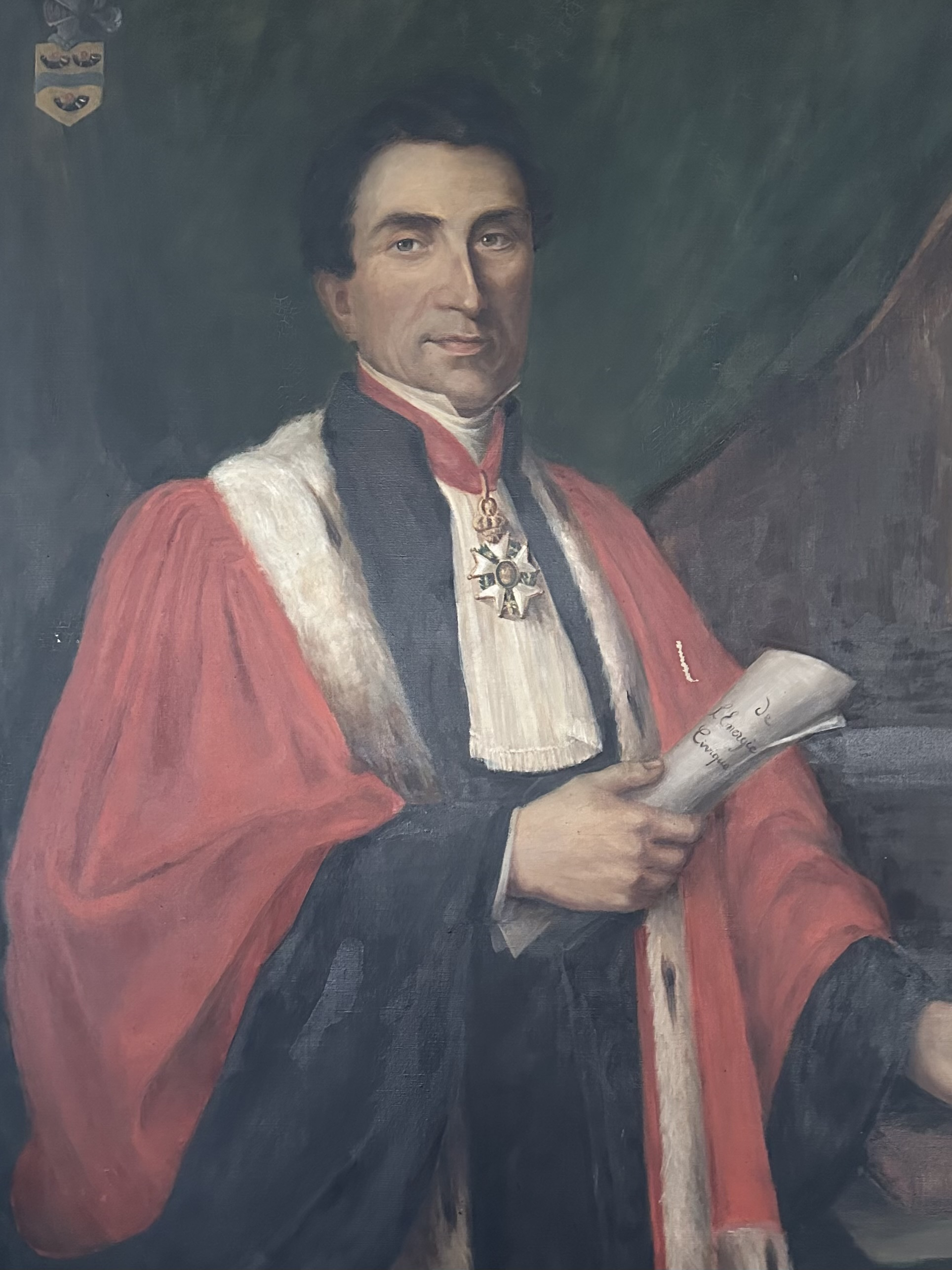
- Born: 1800; Bourges, France
- Died: 1874 (aged 73–74); France
- Occupations: Procureur-général, politician
- Known for: Minister of Justice

Eugène Corbin (1800–1874) was a French procureur général (prosecutor-general) and politician. During the French Second Republic (1848–1851) he helped suppress opposition to the government headed by Louis Napoleon. He was appointed Minister of Justice during the preparations for the coup of 2 December 1851, but did not accept the office and was replaced a few days later. He was first president of the Bourges court of appeal from 1852 until 1870.

== Early years ==
Eugène Corbin was born in 1800 to one of the leading families of Bourges. He married Victorine Boin, daughter of Antoine-Victor Boin, a doctor who was deputy for the department of Cher from 1815 to 1827. Eugène Corbin was appointed substitut (deputy) procureur-général at the royal court of Bourges in August 1830. He also worked for the court at Angers. He was known for his ability as a speaker.

== Second Republic ==
During the French Second Republic, Corbin ran unsuccessfully as a conservative candidate in the May 1849 national elections. He blamed his defeat on "red" candidates who claimed to be the true representatives of the people and promised to tax the rich and give the money to the poor. After the attempted insurrection of 13 June 1849 Corbin persecuted the opponents of Louis Napoleon in the departments of Cher, Indre and Nièvre, and forced them to go underground The secret societies they formed did not at first seem to be a serious threat. Corbin said that some of the "montagnardes" who spread the ideas of a social and democratic republic were relatively well-educated men, with professional status, the best example being Félix Pyat, a lyrical and admired orator. More typically they were letter carriers, railway officials, teachers and minor officials.

Corbin became procureur-général at Bourges on 3 November 1849. On 19 November 1850 Corbin asked the legislative assembly for authority to pursue two of its members. In December 1850 Corbin talked of an "Amelioration de l'esprit public" (improvement in public feeling). However, tensions mounted and early in September 1851 he launched a huge hunt against the Republicans. In justifying his actions Corbin spoke of revolutionaries who exploited working class poverty and the plight of farmers. He described secret initiation ceremonies with solemn oaths and raised the specter of a return to the anarchy and violence of the first French Revolution. In the autumn of 1851 two military commissions arrested 1,200 people in the Cher department, of whom 857 were given sentences that ranged from being placed under surveillance to deportation.

Corbin was appointed Minister of Justice on 26 October 1851 by Louis-Napoleon Bonaparte. He was to replace Eugène Rouher, whose resignation had been accepted. Charles Giraud, Minister of Education and Religious Affairs, was named interim minister of justice in Corbin's absence. Corbin did not accept the appointment. On 1 November 1851 Alfred Daviel was made keeper of the seals and minister of justice.

== Later career ==
Corbin retained his position at the court of Bourges. He addressed the court at an opening ceremony on 3 November 1851. Corbin replaced Claude Denis Mater as first president of the Bourges Court of Appeals in 1852. He held office until 1870, when he was succeeded by Louis Baudouin. During the Franco-Prussian War (19 July 1870 – 10 May 1871), on 20 September 1870 he addressed the National Assembly on the emergency situation.

Eugène Corbin was awarded the rank of commander of the Legion of Honour. He died in 1874.

== Sources ==
- Bogue, David (1852). The men of the time in 1852, or, sketches of living notables ... David Bogue, printed by G. Barclay.
- Bulletin des lois. Partie principale. Imprimerie nationale. 1856. p. 288.
- Corbin, Eugène, le procureur général près la Cour d'appel de Bourges (19 November 1850). Demande en autorisation de poursuites contre deux membres de l'Assemblée nationale formée. Assemblée législative.
- Corbin, M. (3 November 1851). Audience solennelle de rentrée. De l'énergie civique. Cour d'appel de Bourges: Précy et Beffes Cher.
- Cordillot, Michel (2004). "Les fouriéristes, les "Mariannes" et le coup d'Etat du 2 décembre 1851".
- "Foreign News: France". The Gentleman's Magazine and Historical Review. Bradbury, Evans. 1851. p. 528.
- Galisset, Ch. M. (1852). Corps du droit français ou recueil complet des lois, décrets, ordonnances, sénatusconsultes, règlements ... publiés depuis 1789 jusqu'à nos jours.
- Julhiet, Ange-Pierre-Félicien; Corbin, Eugène (3 November 1860). Audience solennelle de rentrée. Cour impériale de Bourges.
- "Les chefs de Cour au fil du temps". Cour d'appel de Bourges. 2 January 2007.
- Narboux, Roland (2009). "Les sociétés secrètes a Bourges". l'Encyclopédie de Bourges.
- "Nouvelles Politiques". L'Ami de la religion. Librairie Ecclésiastique d'adrien le clere et cie. 1830.
- Pauquet, Alain (1 February 1998). La société et les relations sociales en Berry au milieu du XIXe siècle. Editions L'Harmattan. ISBN 978-2-296-35748-8.
- Pigenet, Michel (1989). "Signification des votes ouvriers dans le département du Cher (1848-1914)". Revue française de science politique. 39 (5): 716–741. doi:10.3406/rfsp.1989.394442.
- Wright, Vincent (2007). Les préfets de Gambetta. Presses Paris Sorbonne. ISBN 978-2-84050-504-4.
