= Ernest de Royer =

French lawyer, magistrate and politician

Paul Henri Ernest de Royer
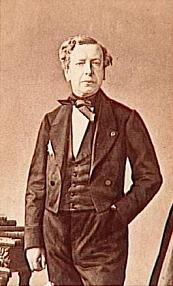
- Ernest de Royer on 1 January 1860
- Born: 29 October 1808; Versailles, France
- Died: 13 December 1877 (aged 69); Paris, France
- Occupations: Lawyer, magistrate and politician
- Known for: Minister of Justice

Paul Henri Ernest de Royer (29 October 1808 – 13 December 1877) was a French lawyer, magistrate and politician. He was Minister of Justice in 1851 under the French Second Republic, and again from 1857 to 1859 under the Second French Empire.

== Early years ==
Ernest de Royer was born in Versailles, France, on 29 October 1808. His father was Joseph Etienne Royer-Dupré, in 1801 Directeur des contributions directes de Grenoble. He attended school in Marseille and then studied law at Grenoble and Paris. He qualified as an advocate in 1829. Ernest de Royer joined the bench at the start of the reign of King Louis Philippe I on 9 May 1832 as a substitute at the tribunal of Die, and served in the same position in turn at Sainte-Menehould (1833), Châlons-sur-Marne (1834), Reims (1835) and Paris (1841). He was named substitute at the Royal Court on 22 October 1846, and advocate-general on 3 April 1848. On 17 May 1850 he was named Attorney General at the Paris Court of Appeal.

== Political career ==
Ernest de Royer was Minister of Justice from 24 January to 10 April 1851. After the coup of 2 December 1851 he was a member of the Advisory Commission and then a member of the Council of State. He returned to the bench in 1853, and became Attorney General at the Court of Cassation. He was again appointed Minister of Justice on 16 November 1857 after the death of Jacques Pierre Abbatucci. Following the assassination attempt by Felice Orsini on 14 January 1858 he was responsible for the new general security law.

== Later career ==
Ernest de Royer left office on 4 May 1859 and was appointed to the Senate the next day, with the title of first vice-president. He was the first president of the Court of Auditors in 1863, and was also President of the General Council of the Marne. After the fall of the Empire in 1870, he returned to his career as a magistrate. Ernest de Royer died in Paris on 13 December 1877, aged 69. His son Clément de Royer was one of the leaders of the Bonapartist movement in the French Third Republic.
