= Jean Charles Abbatucci =

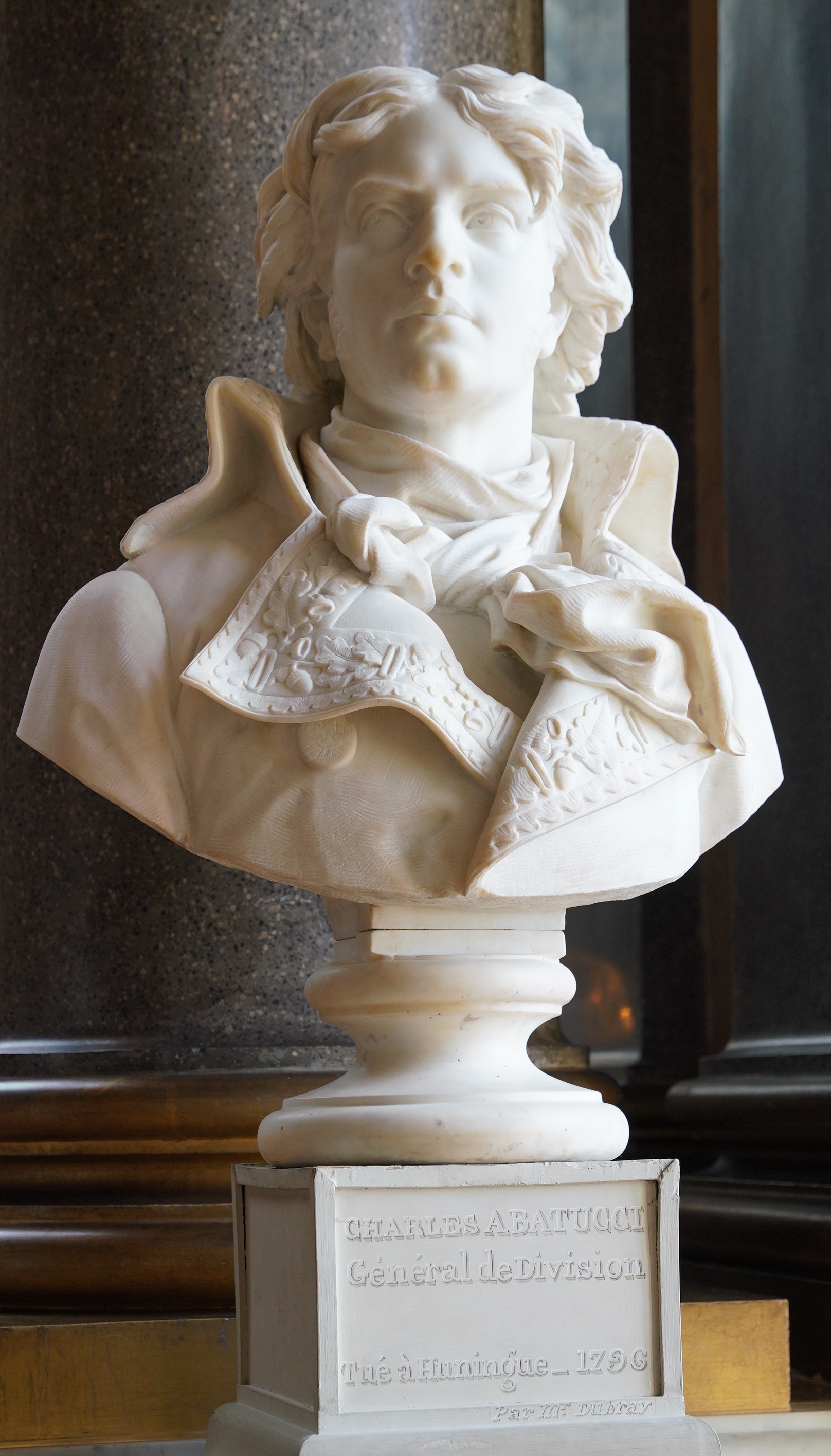
- Born: 15 November 1770; Zicavo
- Died: 2 December 1796 (aged 26); Huningue
- Military career
- Allegiance: French Republic
- Branch: French Army
- Service years: 1787–1796
- Rank: Général de Division
- Awards: Name engraved on Arc de Triomphe

Jean Charles Abbatucci or Abatucci (French pronunciation: [ʒɑ̃ ʃaʁl abatutʃi]; 15 November 1770 – 2 December 1796) was a French general during the War of the First Coalition. His name is engraved on the Arc de Triomphe.

== Life ==
The son of the general Jacques Pierre Abbatucci, Jean Charles was born in Zicavo, Corsica, and studied at the military school in Metz, leaving it in 1787 aged 17 to join the 2nd regiment of foot artillery as a sous-lieutenant. At the start of the 1792 campaign he was still only a captain of artillery, but his brilliant conduct brought him to the rank of lieutenant colonel before the end of 1792. In 1793 he moved to France's newly formed horse artillery. In 1794 Jean-Charles Pichegru chose Abbatucci as capitaine premier, the general's aide de camp and together they led the campaign in Holland.

Jean Victor Marie Moreau then gave Abbatucci and generals Bellavène, Decaen and Montrichard the task of organising the Rhine crossing at Kehl, which was carried out on 26 June 1796. Abbatucci fought on the river Kitzing on 27 June and on 14 July that year fought a pitched battle at Schweighausen against the corps de Condé. These successes won him the rank of général de brigade (effective on 10 July 1796) and on 12 August he fought the Émigré rearguard at Wertheim which he had pursued as far as Erkheim. On 13 August he was defeated at Kammlach by the Duc d'Enghein and was forced to surrender with all his troops.

Rescued in extremis by the 89th demi-brigade, he took the offensive once again and pushed the Émigrés back as far as Mindelheim, where he took 1,000 prisoners. He crossed the Lech into Bavaria on 24 August 1796 and again showed his bravery on this occasion – the biographie Mullié states that "he had to cross this wide and rapid river in front of the enemy : the first battalion that he sent was submerged by the river waters. Immediately rushing to the head of a second battalion, he animated his troops by his example and his words, supported those who were stumbling, saved those whose courage was leaving them and finally led them onto the enemy banks where they overthrew the Austrians who they had already beaten once that day".

He then captured Kissing and marched on Regensburg to cut off the enemy retreat, for which he rose to the rank of général de division. On 30 August he repulsed an attack on him by the Austrian general Deway at the river Isar. During the retreat of the Armée Rhin et Moselle he commanded the rearguard and in September led an attack against the fort at Kehl. In October he stopped the enemy near Neubourg. He was then put in control of the stronghold of Huningue, which covered upper Alsace and thus was highly important for Moreau in his re-crossing of the Rhine back into France after Jourdan's disasters in Franconia. The Austrians soon came to attack Huningue, at the same time besieging Kehl, where Desaix and Lecourbe were leading the French defence. Abbattucci held out for a months against 10,000 Austrians but he was mortally wounded in a night sortie he led on 30 November to 1 December 1796, dying at Huningue on 2 December aged 26. The French surrendered Huningue on 5 February 1797.

== Memorials ==
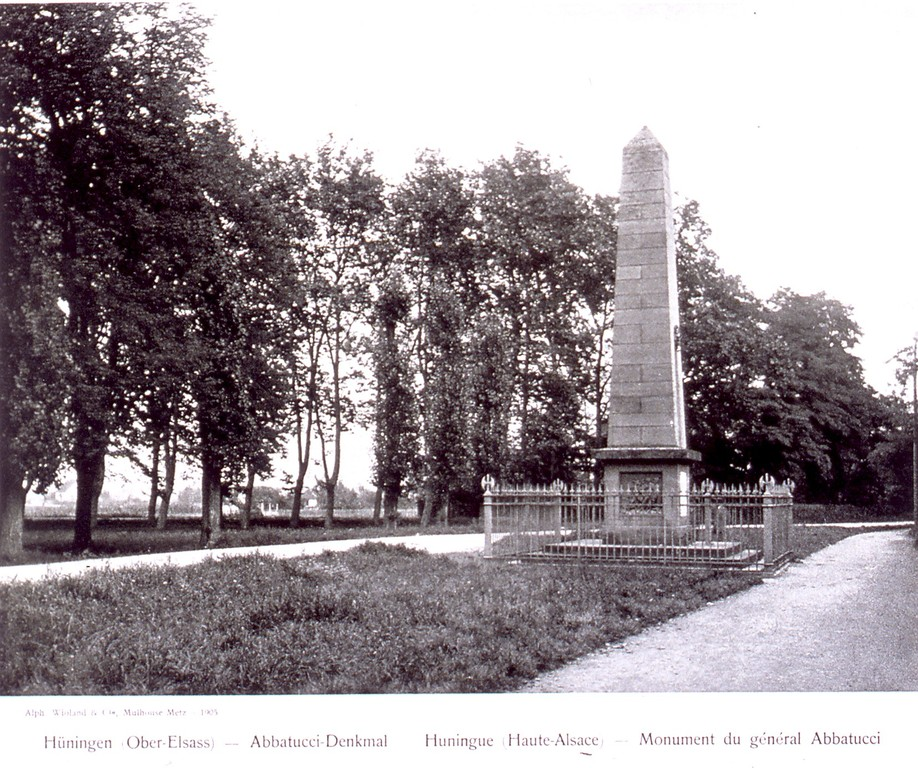
1906: View of Monument.

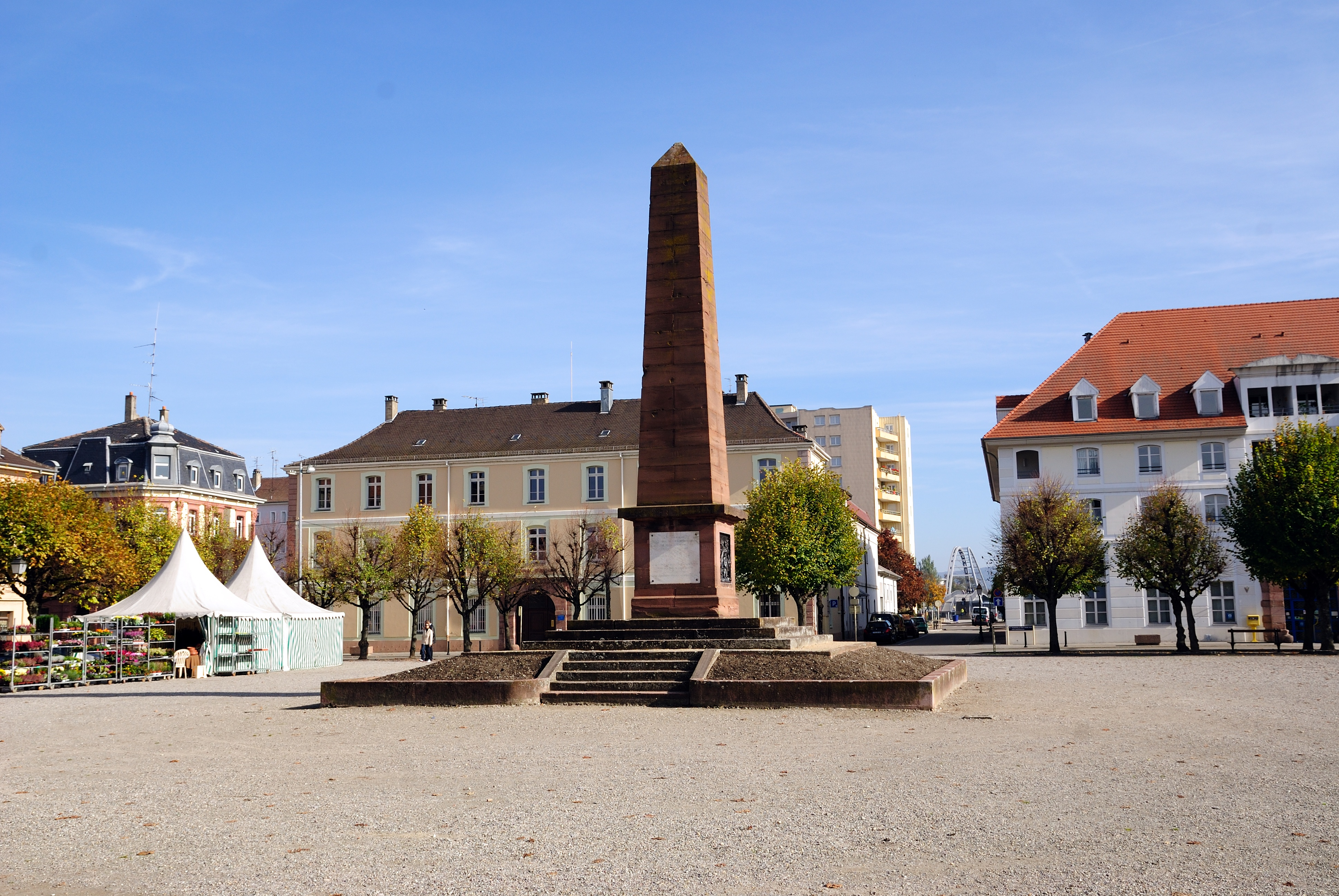
Place Abbatucci in Hüningen, showing the obelisk monument to the general.

After the peace was concluded, Moreau put up a monument to Abbatucci in 1801 on the site of his death, which Allied troops destroyed during the siege of Huningue in 1815. In 1819 general Rapp began a subscription to re-establish the memorial but this only came to fruition under the July Monarchy and on the initiative of general Foy. The restored monument was inaugurated in 1856, with the addition of two bronze bas-reliefs by Philippe Grass. It is built in sandstone, marble and bronze, showing the general fighting and at the moment of his death. In 1904, the monument was moved from the route de Saint-Louis to Huningue's place Abbatucci). There is also a statue of him in Ajaccio, on its place Abbatucci.
