= Montell =

Montell is a given name and surname. Notable people with the name include:

== Given name ==
- Montell Douglas (born 1986), British sprinter and former British record holder for the 100 metres
- Montell Fish (born 1997), American singer-songwriter
- Montell Griffin (born 1970), American boxer
- Montell Jordan (born 1968), American R&B singer-songwriter and record producer
- Montell Owens (born 1984), American football fullback for the Jacksonville Jaguars of the National Football League

== Surname ==
- Donny Montell (born 1987), Lithuanian singer-songwriter
- Denise Montell, American biologist
- Karen Montell, American politician
- Victor Montell (1886–1967), Danish stage and film actor

== See also ==
- Montel, given name and surname
- Montrell, given name and surname
