= Jacques Pierre Abbatucci (military officer) =

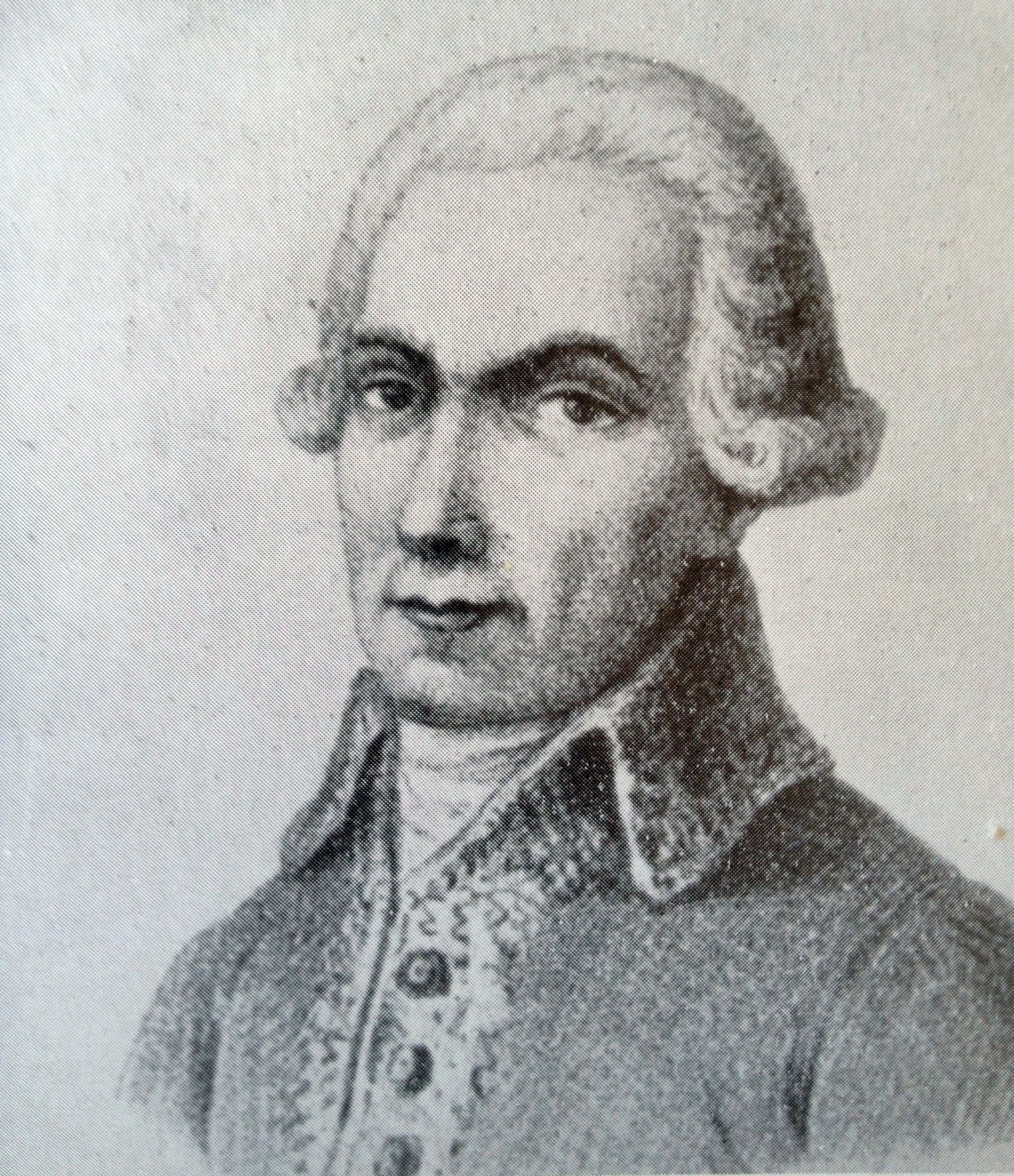
- Born: 7 September 1723; Zicavo, Corsica
- Died: 17 March 1813 (aged 89); Ajaccio
- Education: University of Padua
- Occupation: Military officer

Jacques Pierre Abbatucci (Geacoms Petro Abbatucci) (7 September 1723 in Zicavo, Corsica – 17 March 1813 in Ajaccio) was a Corsican who became an officer in the army of Genoese Corsica, Ancien regime France and the French First Republic.

== Family ==
Jacques-Pierres family was one of the French nobility. His father was Jean Séverin Antoine Abbatucci, a Corsican general in the service of the Venetian Republic, and his mother was Rose Paganelli, daughter of the Corsican general Dominique Paganelli, known as Zicavo. Jacques Pierre's three sons also served in the French Republican army:

- Séverin – died in 1794 at Toulon from wounds received at the battle of Calvi
- Jean Charles – general, died in 1796 at Huningue.
- Antoine – chef de bataillon, died in 1798 during the French invasion of Egypt.

Jacque Pierre's grandson Jacques Pierre Abbatucci was a government minister during the Second French Empire

== Life ==
=== Corsica under Genoese rule ===
He studied at the Jesuit collège in Brescia, before graduating with a doctorate in medicine from the University of Padua in 1746. He moved back to Corsica where in 1753, after the assassination of Gian Pietro Gaffori, he became an advisor to Petreto, lieutenant-general of the Pieve militia in Ornano, Istria, Rocca and Talavu. The situation on the island at that time was very tense – Genoa was trying desperately to hold onto the island, but the departure of the French troops commanded Cursay put this in a perilous situation. In 1755 Pasquale Paoli was elected general of the Corsicans by 16 of the 66 pievi or provinces, with the four southern pievi (including Abbatucci's) joining him in 1757. Abbatucci was elected lieutenant general of the south of the island in 1763, in what was effectively an internal coup within the Corsica militias. This led to his arrest and imprisonment at Corte by Paoli from November 1763 to May 1764, after which he was banished. Even so, he remained on Corsica until 1766, before leaving for Tuscany.

In 1766 Paoli made Abbatucci general of the south of Corsica. In October 1768 he fought Chauvelin's forces in the battle of Borgo, before stopping Grandmaison and relieving Narbonne. After defeat at the battle of Ponte Novu, Abbatucci covered Paoli's retreat, then swore allegiance to the king of France.

=== French army officer ===
He was immediately made a captain of dragoons with the rank of lieutenant colonel in the Corsican legion, before rising to be a full lieutenant colonel in 1770. He consolidated his position by his election to Corsica's Estates then his being made a lieutenant colonel in command of the régiment Provincial-Corse. He also was instructed to combat the banditry, notably in the Fium'Orbo, but was implicated in a murder case following false testimony and was arrested in 1779. He was then sentenced to nine year service in the galleys. But after three years the ruling was overturned as Abbatucci was declared innocent before the parliament of Aix in 1786. He was made a knight of the Order of Saint Louis on 6 September 1789.

On the French Revolution, he was elected colonel general of the National Guard of the southern Piève before being retired. He then became Maréchal de camp on 1 March 1791 at the head of the guards of the two Corsican cantons, where he fought off Geneoese threats to Corsican independence. Beaten in the elections to the National Convention in 1793, he remained on Corsica and with the représentants sent by the Convention organised the resistance to the British attempts to retake Corsica in the name of Paoli. After their defeat at the siege of Toulon by Napoleon Bonaparte, another Corsican, the British captured Saint-Florent in February 1794, then laid Siege to Bastia in May. Abbatucci took part in the Defence of Calvi against the British, negotiating for the stronghold's surrender with full military honours in August and being repatriated to Toulon by the British.

He was finally made a général de brigade on 17 December 1795 in the armée d'Italie under Bonaparte, rising to général de division on 16 April 1796. He was released from campaigning in 1796 due to his age (he was now 73) and was posted to Aix-en-Provence, where he exercised a command as général de division on Corsica until the end of 1796. His retirement was authorised in December 1796, and so he was discharged in January 1797 and finally retired on 23 September 1800 being provided with a pension of 1,800 francs.
