= Montrell Craft =

American gridiron football player (born 1987)

Profile
- Position: Defensive tackle

Personal information
- Born: December 11, 1988 (age 37); Memphis, Tennessee
- Listed height: 6 ft 3 in (1.91 m)
- Listed weight: 280 lb (127 kg)

Career information
- College: North Alabama
- NFL draft: 2010: undrafted

Career history
- BC Lions (2010); Alabama Hammers (2012)

Career CFL statistics
- Tackles: 11
- Sacks: 0
- Interceptions: 0

Montrell Craft (born August 14, 1987 in Memphis, Tennessee) is a defensive tackle who is currently a free agent. He most recently played for the Alabama Hammers of the Professional Indoor Football League. Craft signed as a free agent with the BC Lions on May 18, 2010. He currently coaches football at New Bolivar Central High School in Bolivar, TN. He and his twin brother, Marcell Craft, played college football for the North Alabama Lions and both became members of Phi Beta Sigma fraternity.
