= Eugène Rouher =

French statesman (1814–1884)

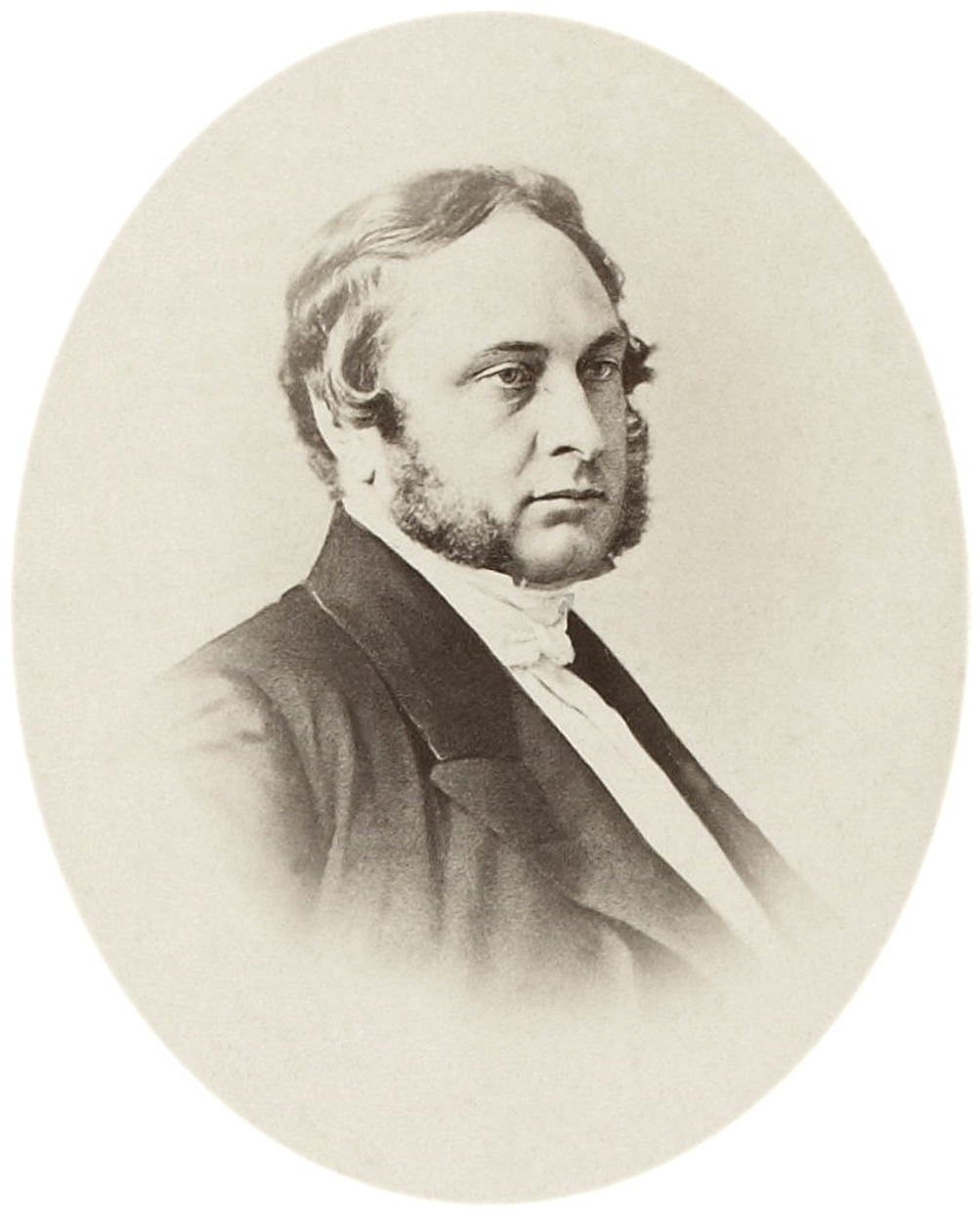
Eugène Rouher

Eugène Rouher (30 November 1814 – 3 February 1884) was a French statesman of the Second Empire.

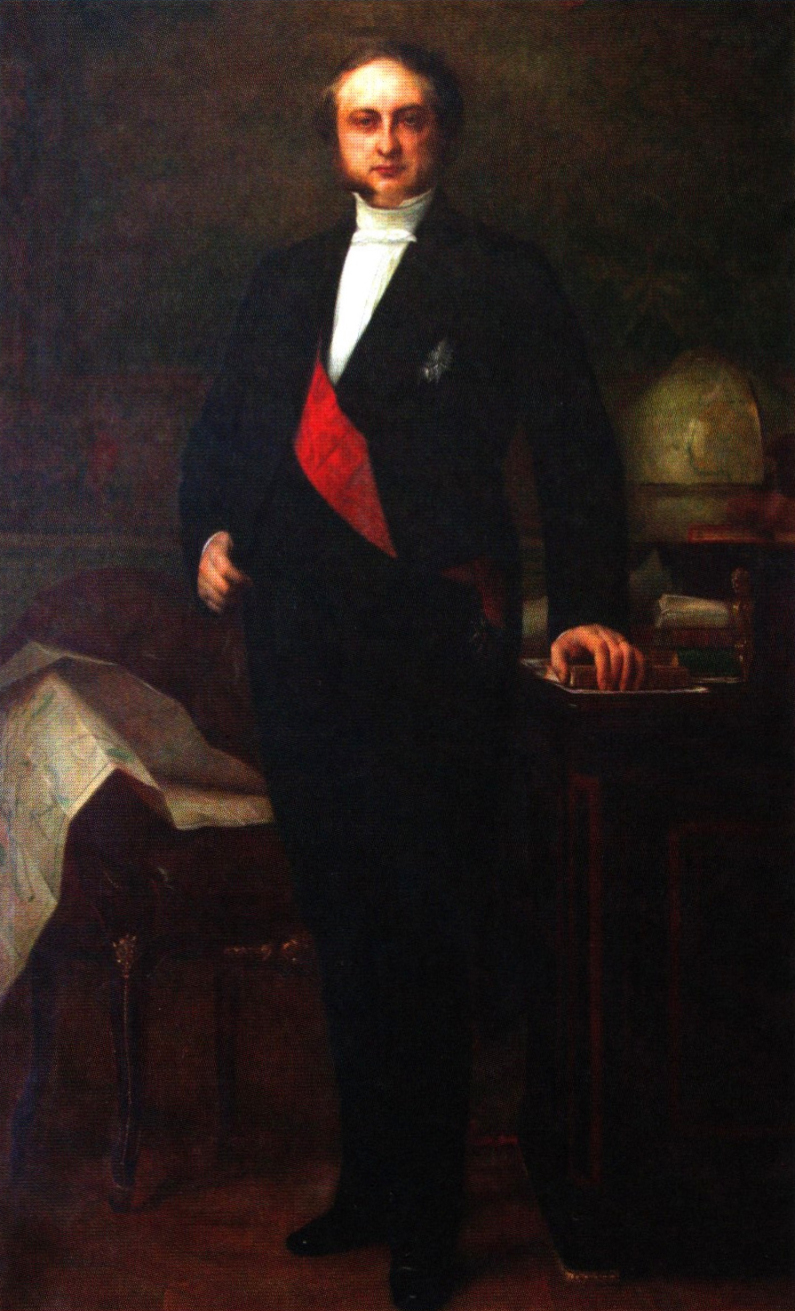
A portrait of Rouher by Alexandre Cabanel, first exhibited at the Salon des Beaux Arts in 1861. One of the distinctive maps by Charles Joseph Minard is draped over a chair in the background. This version is a painted copy by Charles Brun, currently at the Mandet Museum in Riom, France.

He was born at Riom (Puy-de-Dôme), where he practised law after taking his degree in Paris in 1835. In 1846 he sought election to the Chamber of Deputies as an official candidate of the Guizot ministry. It was only after the Revolution of 1848, however, that he became deputy for the department of Puy-de-Dôme. Re-elected to the Legislative Chamber in 1849 he succeeded Odilon Barrot as minister of justice, with the additional office of keeper of the seals (20 December 1848 to 26 October 1851 and 3 December 1851 to 22 January 1852).

From the tribune of the Chamber he described the revolution of February as a "catastrophe," and he supported reactionary legislation, notably the bill (31 May 1850) for the limitation of the suffrage. After the coup d'état of 2 December 1851, he was entrusted with the redaction of the new constitution, and on his resignation of office in January became vice-president of the Council of State. After the formal establishment of the Empire, Napoleon III rewarded him with a grant of £40,000 and the estate of Cirey.

In 1855 he became minister of agriculture, commerce and public works, and in 1856 senator. He created France's excellent system of railways without making them a state monopoly, and he conducted the complicated negotiations for the treaty of commerce with England which was concluded in January 1860, and subsequently arranged similar treaties with Belgium and Italy. On 23 June 1863 he became minister president of the Council of State, and on the death of Adolphe Billault on 18 October 1863 minister of state and chief spokesman of the emperor. before the Corps Législatif.

Although the government had a great majority in the Chamber, the opposition counted the redoubtable names of Adolphe Thiers, Berryer and Jules Favre, and government measures were only passed by frequent resort to the closure. Rouher had to defend Napoleon's foreign adventures as well as the free trade treaties and the extravagances of Baron Haussmann for which he was directly responsible. After an attempted defence of the foreign policy which had aided the aggrandizement of Prussia at the expense of Austria, Thiers told him in the Chamber that there were "no more blunders left for him to make."

He opposed the abortive Liberal concessions of January 1867, announced in a personal letter from Napoleon III to himself, and resigned with the rest of the cabinet, only to resume office after a short interval as minister of finance from 20 January to 13 November 1867. When concessions became inevitable Rouher, the "vice-empereur" resigned to make way after six months' interval for Emile Ollivier. He still fought for reaction in his new office of President of the French Senate from 20 July, to 4 September 1870. After the fall of the Empire he fled to England, but returned to France a year later to work for the fortunes of the prince imperial. After serious disturbances he was elected member for Ajaccio on 11 February 1872, his election being characterized by the prefect of Corsica as a regular conspiracy in favour of the Empire.

In the Chamber, where he subsequently represented Riom, he formed the group of the Appel au Peuple. His first speech in the House was the occasion (21 May 1872) of violent attacks by Audiffret-Pasquier and Léon Gambetta.

In the 1876 legislative elections for the Bastia constituency Rouher won 8,790 votes against 4,367 votes for Patrice de Corsi, and was proclaimed elected on 25 February 1876.

The death of the prince imperial in 1879 put an end to the serious chances of the Bonapartists, although Rouher sought to secure the recognition of Prince Napoleon, son of Napoleon's brother Jerome, as heir to the Imperial honours. Rouher lost his reason after a stroke of paralysis in 1883, and died a few months later.

Political offices
Preceded by Alexandre Marie	Minister of Justice; 1848–1851	Succeeded by Eugène Corbin
Preceded by Alfred Daviel	Minister of Justice; 1851–1852	Succeeded by Jacques Pierre Abbatucci

== Sources ==
- Hugot (1876), Annales du Sénat et de la Chambre des députés. Débats et documents (in French), Journal Officiel
- This article incorporates text from a publication now in the public domain: Chisholm, Hugh, ed. (1911). "Rouher, Eugène". Encyclopædia Britannica. Vol. 23 (11th ed.). Cambridge University Press. p. 770.
