= Jean Joseph Victor Génissieu =

French lawyer and politician (1749–1804)

Minister of Justice
- In office 5 January 1796 – 4 April 1796
- Preceded by: Philippe-Antoine Merlin de Douai
- Succeeded by: Philippe-Antoine Merlin de Douai

President of the National Convention
- In office 8 October 1795 – 26 October 1795
- Preceded by: Pierre Charles Louis Baudin
- Succeeded by: Office abolished

Personal details
- Born: 29 October 1749 Chabeuil, Drôme, Kingdom of France
- Died: 27 October 1804 (aged 54) Paris, French Empire
- Occupation: Lawyer; politician

Jean Joseph Victor Génissieu (29 October 1749 – 27 October 1804) was a French lawyer and politician who was in turn president of the National Convention, Minister of Justice and president of the Council of Five Hundred during the French Revolution.

== Early years ==
Jean Joseph Victor Génissieu was born in Chabeuil, Drôme, in October 1749. (Note: The parish records show Jean-Joseph-Victor Génissieu was baptized on 30 October 1749, born the day before. His biographer Rochas gives his date of birth as 2 June 1751, in error. That was the date of birth of his brother Charles-François.) His family originally came from Parnans, near Romans-sur-Isère. His grandfather Clément Génissieu left that village towards the end of the 17th century and established himself as a merchant in Chabeuil. His parents were Joseph Génissieux, notary and prosecutor, and Dominique Faure. Jean Joseph Victor Génissieu became an advocate with the Grenoble parliament before the Revolution. When the revolution broke out in 1789, he assisted in the assembly of Vizille and organized the "People's Society of Grenoble." In 1790 he was named administrator of the Grenoble district and judge of the Grenoble court.

== Political career ==
In September 1792, Génissieu was elected to the National Convention for the department of Isère, and became one of the most important members. He was an ardent revolutionary. He did not sit with the Mountain, but was associated with almost all the violent measures of the Convention. On 16 December 1792 he demanded that all members of the royal family be banished, including the Duke of Orleans. On 20 January 1793 he voted for the death of King Louis XVI without appeal or reprieve. On 26 March he demanded that all the former nobles be disarmed. On 31 March 1793 Génissieu spoke in the Convention in favor of banning performances of Voltaire's play Mérope. The allusions in the play to a queen in mourning were awkward since Louis XVI had just been executed. On 22 July he voted that a forced loan, voted the month before, be levied only on the capitalists. On 5 July he declared that the priests and nobles who took part in the Vendée uprising should be treated as chiefs of brigands. He constantly pressed for the most severe measures against the émigrés.

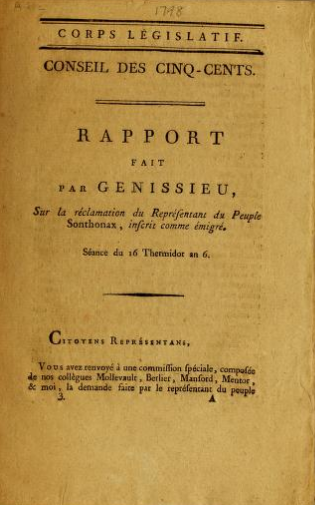
Report to the Council of Five Hundred on 16 Thermidor VI (3 August 1798)

After the Thermidorian Reaction of 9 Thermidor II (27 July 1794) Génissieu was charged with examining the conduct of the revolutionary tribunal of Brest. He submitted a cold and impartial report on 16 Prairial III (4 June 1795) describing actions that had often been appalling. His reports on the conduct of the deputies Dupin and Chaudron-Rousseau, justly accused of great misdeeds, were equally dispassionate. In a speech on 11 Floréal III (30 April 1795) Génissieu discussed the dilemma that to make the Committee of Public Safety more efficient by giving it more power would risk a dangerous transfer of authority from the elected convention to the anonymous bureaucracy.

Génissieu was the author of the law of 28 Thermidor III (15 August 1795) that declared void all revolutionary judgments since 10 March 1793. While maintaining his position on the émigrés, on 18 Fructidor III (4 September 1795) he asked that Charles Maurice de Talleyrand-Périgord be removed from the list. Four days later he voted for a law restoring their property to deported priests, but he was the author of a law the next day banning all intransigent priests and the parents of émigrés from public office. He always took the position of someone whose political views did not blind him to the need for justice. However, after having voted for a law that allowed the accused to challenge their judges in some circumstances, he declared that the parents of émigrés could not sit on juries. Génissieu was made president of the Convention on 16 Vendemiaire IV (8 October 1795). On 4 Brumaire IV (26 October 1795) he declared that the Convention had completed its mission.

Génissieu was elected to the Council of Five Hundred for Isère. On 17 Nivôse IV (6 January 1796) he accepted the post of Minister of Justice. He held office until 3 April 1796, when he was replaced by Philippe-Antoine Merlin de Douai. He had resigned since he could not achieve his goals. He was appointed French consul in Barcelona. He refused this position and was named deputy commissioner of the Court of Cassation on 14 Germinal IV (23 April 1796). Two years later, the Council of Five Hundred nominated Génissieu to the Council of Ancients as a Director, but Jean Baptiste Treilhard was accepted instead. Génissieu was reelected to the Council of Five Hundred for the Seine, and was elected president of the Council on 30 Prairial VII (18 June 1799).

== Later years ==
Génissieu was opposed to the coup of 18 Brumaire VIII (9 November 1799) in which Napoleon came to power. He was arrested on 20 Brumaire for having declared Napoleon should be outlawed. He was released after six hours. A few days later he relented and accepted the position of a judge in the court of the Seine. He died in Paris on 27 October 1804. A street in Grenoble carries his name.

== Publications ==
Génissieu's publications included:

- Au nom du peuple français. Proclamation du représentant du peuple Genissieu, en mission dans les départemens de l'Orne et de la Sarthe, aux patriotes appellés à la défense du département de la Sarthe.
- Rapport fait par Génissieu, au nom de la commission chargée de présenter les moyens d'élever les recettes de l'an 7 au niveau des dépenses séance du 26 germinal an 7
- Proclamation du représentant du peuple Génissieu, en mission dans les départements de l'Orne et de la Sarthe, aux patriotes appelés à la défense du département de la Sarthe
- France. Loi qui exclut jusqu'à la paix, de toutes fonctions publiques, les provocateurs ou signataires de mesures séditieuses et contraires aux lois ... 1795:
