= Moral Order =

1870s French right-wing coalition

The Moral Order (French: Ordre moral) was a coalition of the right that formed after the successive falls of Napoleon III and the provisional republican government. It is also the name of the policy advocated by the government of Albert de Broglie under the presidency of Marshal Patrice de Mac Mahon starting from 27 May 1873.

== Context ==
=== Challenges of an emerging republic ===
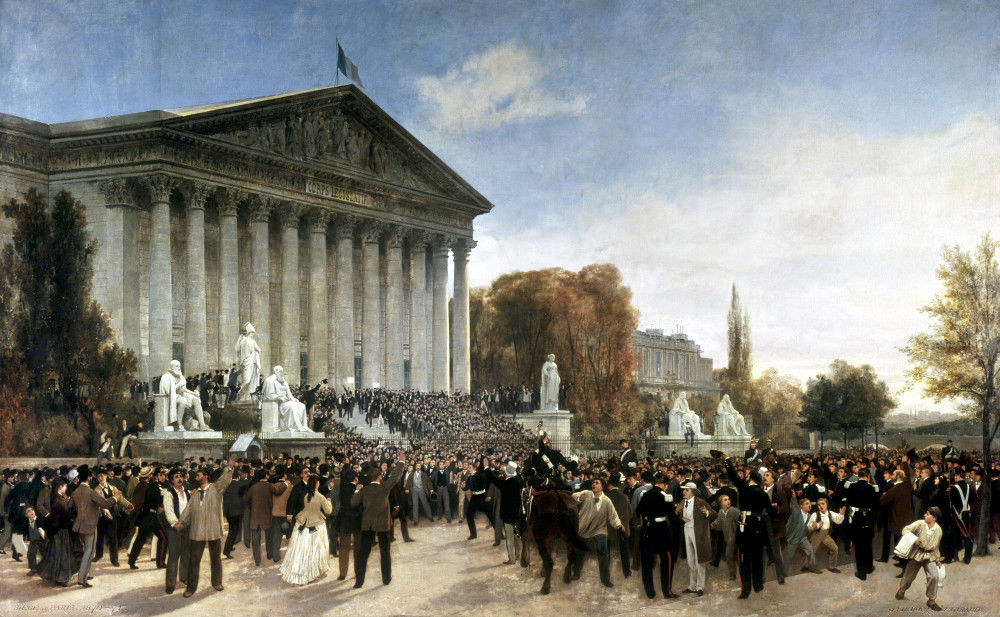
The crowd in front of the Corps législatif on the morning of 4 September 1870, painting by Jacques Guiaud and Jules Didier.

On 4 September 1870, in the ruins of the Second French Empire defeated by Prussia, the Republic was declared. To contain the uprising and prevent a revolutionary government, Republican deputies agreed to form the Government of National Defense. A series of military disasters and the people's suffering during the Siege of Paris eventually brought down the cabinet despite Léon Gambetta's determination.

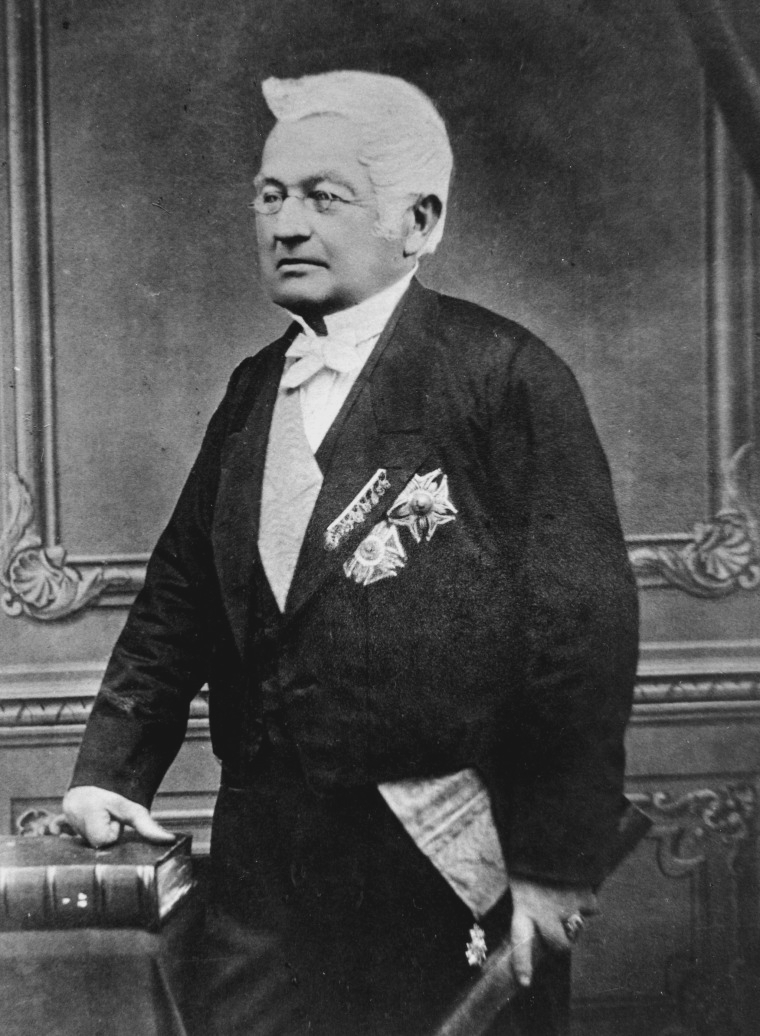
Official portrait of Adolphe Thiers in 1871.

After the monarchists' sweeping victory in the 1871 legislative elections on 8 February 1871, Adolphe Thiers was named "Head of the Executive Power of the French Republic," pending the peace agreement and the restoration of order. A former Orleanist, Thiers viewed the Republic as the only regime capable of maintaining the established order, given the discredit of competing royalist factions. Conversely, the monarchist majority in the National Assembly aimed solely at restoration, with their relationship with the head of state resting on the Bordeaux Pact, a declaration in which Thiers affirmed the institutional status quo and promised to consult the deputies before taking any initiative: "Monarchists, Republicans, neither of you will be deceived".

Under the leadership of the head of state, who officially received the title of President of the French Republic following the Rivet law on 31 August 1871, the regime gradually moved towards conservative republicanism. In fact, monarchists, awaiting a claimant to the throne, avoided drafting a definitive constitution, and the provisional institutions evolved slowly, while Republicans gained ground in each by-election.

=== Break between Thiers and monarchists ===
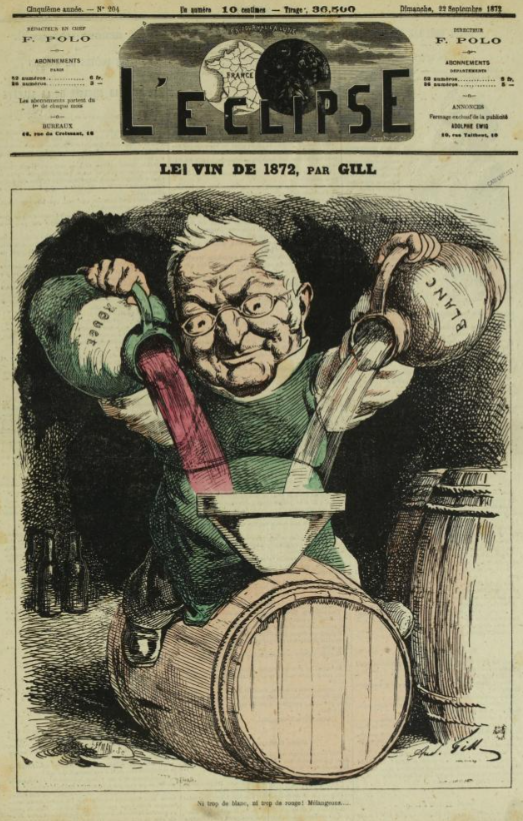
Adolphe Thiers depicted as an oenologist preparing the "1872 wine," symbolizing his attempt at political consolidation. Caricature by André Gill in L'Éclipse, 22 September 1872.

Parliamentary confidence in the head of state waned as Thiers distanced himself from any prospect of monarchist restoration. On 13 November 1872, his speech to the Assembly provoked royalist indignation and hostility: "The Republic exists, it is the legal government; desiring otherwise would be a revolution. […] It will be conservative, or it will not be".

The balance broke on 27 April 1873, when Charles de Rémusat, Thiers' foreign minister, lost a by-election in Paris to Désiré Barodet, a radical mayor of Lyon supported by Léon Gambetta. Monarchists blamed this radical surge on the head of state. The Assembly, led by Duke Albert de Broglie, united royalist factions and harshly criticized Thiers, who, unable to respond due to procedural rules, resigned on 24 May 1873.

== History ==
The coalition of monarchists that emerged following the removal of Adolphe Thiers adopted the name "moral order majority", an expression coined by Marshal Mac Mahon in his Assembly speech on 25 May 1873: "I obey the will of the Assembly, the guardian of national sovereignty, by accepting the role of President of the Republic. It is a heavy responsibility imposed on my patriotism. But with God's help, the devotion of our army, which will always be the army of the law, and the support of all honest citizens, we will together continue the work of liberating the territory and restoring moral order in our country".

This coalition governed briefly, from 24 May 1873 to 16 May 1874, when the Broglie cabinet fell. Its goals included preparing society for a Third Restoration and combating radical Republicanism. The coalition emphasized reinforced religious education as essential to countering the harmful influences of the Enlightenment philosophy and Positivism. On 23 July 1873, the National Assembly declared the construction of the Basilica of the Sacred Heart of Montmartre a public utility. The era ended with the Republican victory in the 1876 legislative elections.

== Notes and references ==
=== Bibliography ===
- Boninchi, Marc (2005). Vichy et l'ordre moral (in French). Paris: Presses Universitaires de France. ISBN 978-2-13-055339-7.
  Olivier, Cyril (2006). "Marc Boninchi, Vichy et l'ordre moral". Revue d'histoire moderne et contemporaine (in French). 53e (4): 223–229. doi:10.3917/rhmc.534.0223.
- Duclert, Vincent (2021) [2010]. 1870-1914: La République imaginée. Folio Histoire (in French). Paris: Gallimard. ISBN 9782072799433.
- Garrigues, Jean; Lacombrade, Philippe (2023). La France au XIXe siècle : 1814–1914. Collection U (in French) (5th ed.). Malakoff: Armand Colin. ISBN 978-2-200-63312-7.
- Grévy, Jérôme (1998). La République des opportunistes (1870-1885). Terre d'histoire (in French). Paris: Perrin. ISBN 2-262-01344-6.
- Houte, Arnaud-Dominique (2014). Le triomphe de la République. 1871-1914. L'Univers historique (in French). Paris: Seuil. ISBN 978-2-02-100102-0.
- René Rémond, Les Droites en France de 1815 à nos jours. Continuité et diversité d'une tradition politique, Aubier-Montaigne, Paris, 1954, rééditions en 1963 (La Droite en France de la première Restauration à la V^{e} République), 1968 et 1982 (Les Droites en France)
- Vincent Adoumié, De la monarchie à la République, 1815-1879, Paris, Hachette, 2004
- Vavasseur-Desperriers, Jean (2009). "Réalités et limites de la coalition d'ordre moral". In Jean-Marc Guislin (ed.). Le Seize-Mai Revisité. Histoire et littérature du Septentrion (IRHiS) (in French). Lille: Publications de l'Institut de recherches historiques du Septentrion. p. 67-77. ISBN 978-2-90563-758-1.
- Tandonnet, Maxime (2017). Histoire des présidents de la République. Tempus (in French). Perrin. p. 87-107. ISBN 9782262069155.
