= First cabinet of Albert de Broglie =

56th cabinet of France

Cabinet de Broglie I
- 56th Cabinet of France

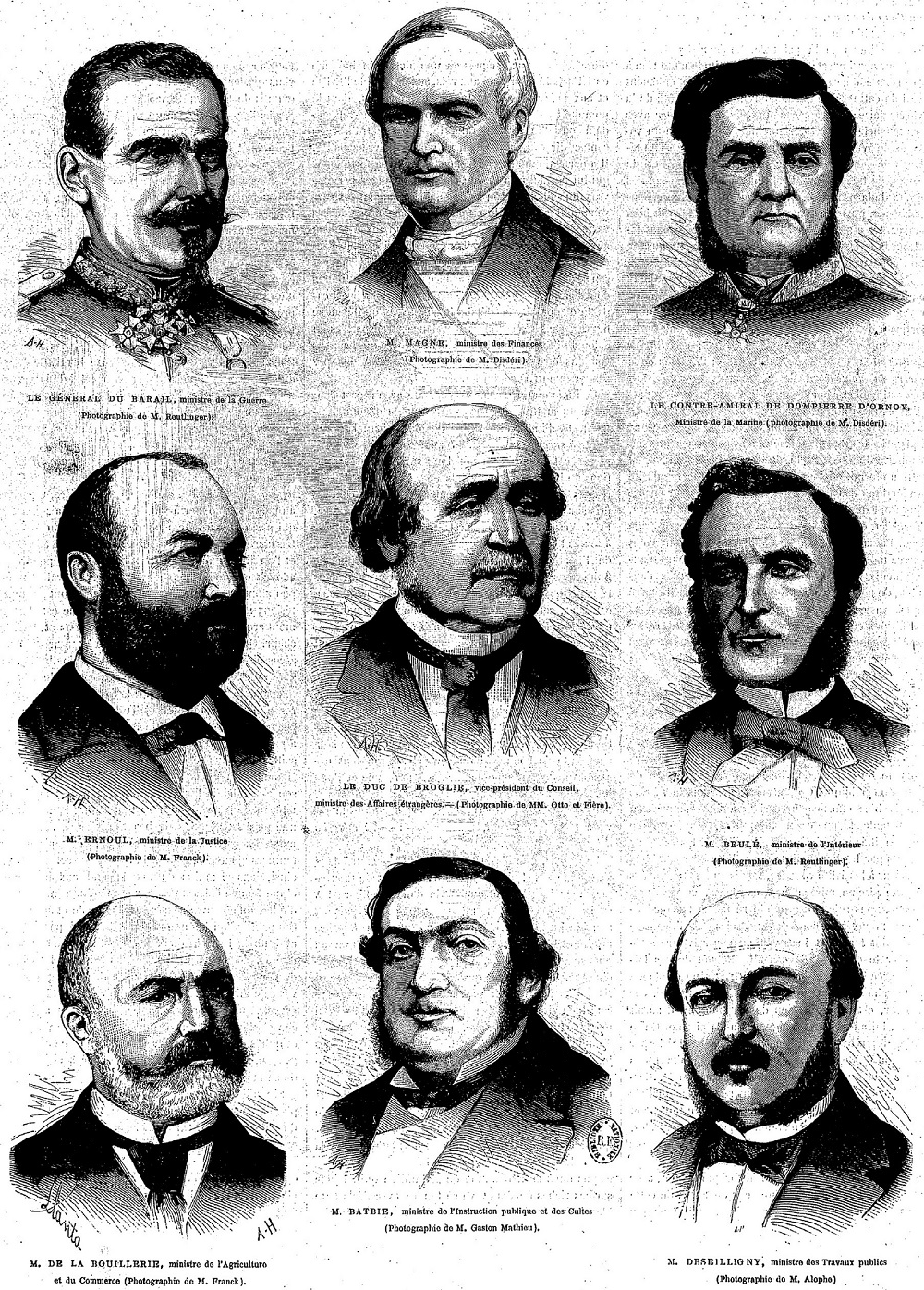
- Date formed: 25 May 1873
- Date dissolved: 26 November 1873

People and organisations
- President: Patrice de MacMahon
- Head of government: Albert de Broglie
- Member parties: Legitimists; Orléanists; Bonapartists
- Status in legislature: Majority (Note: Complementary elections of 2 July 1871.) 390 / 759 (51%)
- Opposition parties: Opportunists; Liberals; Radicals

History
- Election: 1871 legislative election
- Predecessor: Dufaure II
- Successor: de Broglie II

The first cabinet of Albert de Broglie is the 56th cabinet of France and the fourth of the Third Republic, seating from 25 May 1873 to 26 November 1873, headed by Albert de Broglie as vice-president of the Council of Ministers and Minister of Foreign Affairs, under the presidency of Patrice de MacMahon.

== History ==
After the election of Patrice de MacMahon as president to replace Adolphe Thiers, Albert de Broglie was called to form a new conservative government. It indeed comprised only Legitimists, Orléanists and a small number of Bonapartists, in sharp contrast with the previous Cabinet Dufaure II dominated by republicans.

Initial expectations of the monarchist majority was the continuation of the small steps taken in order to restore once again a King in the country. However, that did not take into consideration the large part of the National Assembly and the population who remained largely republicans.

One of these actions was one that would last. In November 1873, the Assembly voted a seven-year term for the President. It would be retained by the following Fourth and Fifth Republics until 2000, date to which it was replaced by a shorter five-year term. The hope was that the position of President of the Republic was only temporary, a sort of place keeper for the return of a monarch.

The core of the government's policy was the Ordre Moral. Under this doctrine, religious education was reinforced with the goal of fighting republican radicalism and what was seen as bad influence of the Lumières. A number of administrations and high level functions were filled with men loyal to the policy, and the press was monitored. Finally, celebrations related to the republic, such as the 14th of July, Bastille Day or the 22nd of September, anniversary of the First Republic, were banned. The government imposed a heavily conservative and catholic grip on the country.

It is under this cabinet, in July 1873, that was voted the law deciding that the construction of the Basilica of the Sacred Heart of Paris would be of public utility. The next day, another law limiting the number of Legion of Honour awarded passed the Assembly.

The cabinet resigned on 26 November 1873, and MacMahon asked de Broglie to form a second cabinet, leading to the Cabinet de Broglie II.

== Composition ==
Vice-president of the Council of Ministers : Albert de Broglie
Portfolio (Note: Order of the list corresponds to the order of appointment.)	Name	Took office	Left office	Party	Ref.
Minister of Foreign Affairs	Albert de Broglie	25 May 1873	26 November 1873	Orleanist	
Minister of Justice	Jean Ernoul	25 May 1873	26 November 1873	Legitimist	
Minister of Interior	Charles Beulé	25 May 1873	26 November 1873	Orleanist	
Minister of Finance	Pierre Magne	25 May 1873	26 November 1873	Orleanist	
Minister of War	Ernest de Cissey	25 May 1873	29 May 1873	Legitimist	
Minister of War	François du Barail	29 May 1873	26 November 1873	Bonapartist	
Minister of Navy and Colonies	Charles de Dompierre d'Hornoy	25 May 1873	26 November 1873	Legitimist	
Minister of Public Instruction	Anselme Batbie	25 May 1873	26 November 1873	Orleanist	
Minister of Public Works	Alfred Deseilligny	25 May 1873	26 November 1873	Orleanist	
Minister of Agriculture	Joseph de la Bouillerie	25 May 1873	26 November 1873	Legitimist	
Undersecretary of State for the Ministry of Interior	Ernest Pascal	25 May 1873	10 June 1873	Bonapartist	
