= Jacques Pierre Abbatucci (politician) =

Corsican-born French politician

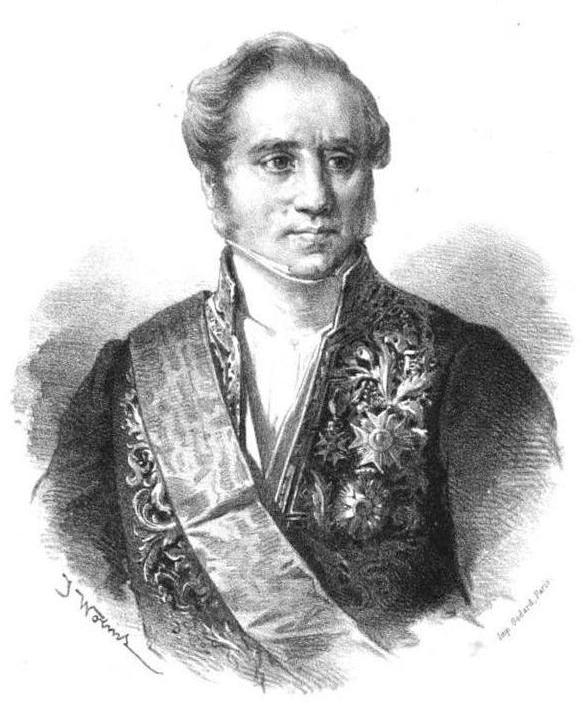
Jacques Pierre Abbatucci

Jacques-Pierre Charles Abbatucci (Corsican: Ghjacumu Petru Carlu Abbatucci; 21 December 1791, Zicavo, Corsica – 11 November 1857, Paris) was a Corsican-born French politician. He was a grandson of Jacques Pierre Abbatucci and a nephew of Jean Charles Abbatucci, both of them generals of the French Revolutionary Wars.

== Life ==
He began his professional life as a lawyer, finally becoming procureur du roi at Sartène in January 1816, conseiller to the royal court of Bastia in March 1819 and président de chambre to the court of Orléans in September 1830. In 1830 he was also elected député for Corsica, before being elected député for Le Loiret from 1839 to 1851. He was made minister of justice, Garde des Sceaux in January then a senator in December 1852, and remained a senator until his death.

Under the July Monarchy, he was an important member of the opposition, close to Odilon Barrot. He distinguished himself in the campaign of reformist banquets, presiding over the banquet at Orléans and showing zeal in organising and assisting at the last forbidden banquet on 22 February 1848. These events would bring about the Monarchy's fall and the proclamation of the Second French Republic.

Under the Second French Empire, in his role as garde des sceaux, he presided over the council of ministers in the emperor's absence. From 1852 to his death in 1857, he was a senator and an official councillor to Napoleon III, who made him chargé des affaires for Corsica, in which role he originated a large part of the immense progress the island realised under the Second Empire.

His son, Jean-Charles Abbatucci (1816–85), was also a deputy under the July Monarchy, and again under the French Third Republic.

== Honors and Awards ==
- Grand Cross of the Order of Legion of Honour
- Grand Cross of the Order of the Immaculate Conception of Vila Viçosa
- Grand Cordon of the Order of Leopold (Belgium)

Political offices
Preceded by Eugène Rouher	Minister of Justice; 1852–1857	Succeeded by Paul de Royer
