= Eugène Montel =

French politician

Eugène Montel (5 June 1885 - 21 January 1966) was a French politician.

== Life ==
Born in Montbazin into a Protestant family, he represented the French Section of the Workers' International (SFIO) in the National Assembly from 1951 to 1966. He was the mayor of Colomiers from 1944 to 1966 and was President of the Conseil général de la Haute-Garonne from 1947 until his death in 1966.
