= Alfred Daviel =

French politician

- Born: 3 March 1800; Évreux, France
- Died: 12 June 1856 (aged 56); Paris, France
- Occupations: lawyer, politician
- Known for: Minister of Justice

Alfred Daviel (12 June 1800 – 3 March 1856) was a French lawyer and politician who was appointed Minister of Justice in the last cabinet of the French Second Republic.

== Early years ==
Alfred Daviel came from a respected Norman bourgeois family. He was born on 3 March 1800 in Évreux, son of François-Denis-Hyacinthe Daviel, advocate, and Hortense Delaroche. His great-uncle was Jacques Daviel (1696–1762), the famous oculist and pioneer of cataract operations. Alfred Daviel studied law in Paris, then became an advocate at the court of Rouen in 1821. He was granted a medal worth 300 francs by the Rouen Academy in 1823 for a thesis on the administration of the dukes of Normandy. He was elected president of the bar in Rouen.

Daviel mixed with liberal and masonic circles in Rouen. After the July Revolution of 1830 he was a strong opponent to the restoration, and was decorated for this by the government of King Louis-Philippe. On 3 September 1830 Jacques-Charles Dupont de l'Eure, the Minister of Justice, appointed him first Advocate General of Rouen. That year he also became a member of the Rouen municipal council and of the Seine-Inférieure general council. Opposed to the reactionary position of Moyne, appointed procureur général in 1832, Daviel resigned and went back to the bar in Rouen. He defended political dissidents and writers such as Armand Carrel. He was again elected president of the Rouen bar in 1843 and 1845.

== Second Republic and Second Empire ==
Daviel was a strong supporter of the Bonaparte regime. The government of Louis-Napoleon Bonaparte appointed him Prosecutor General of Rouen in February 1850. On 1 November 1851 Daviel was made keeper of the seals and Minister of Justice in place of Eugène Corbin, who had refused the appointment. He held office uneventfully until the coup of 2 December 1851, when he returned to his post in Rouen. He was admitted to the Legion of Honour in 1850, made an officer in 1852 and commander in 1853. On 19 June 1854 he was made a senator. In 1854 he was made first honorary president of the Imperial Court of Rouen. Alfred Daviel died in Paris on 12 June 1856.

== Works ==
Daviel was the author of several works including:

- Examen de l'ordonnance du 20 novembre 1822, concernant l'Ordre des avocats (1822)
- Traité de la législation et de la pratique des cours d'eau (1824)
- Lettres (adressées à Me Isambert) sur la liberté individuelle dans l'ancien droit normand (1827)
- De la résistance passive (1829)
- Recherches sur l'origine de l'ancienne coutume de Normandie (1834)
- Commentaire de la loi du 29 avril 1845 sur les irrigations (1845)
