= Zicavo =

Commune in Corsica, France

- Commune
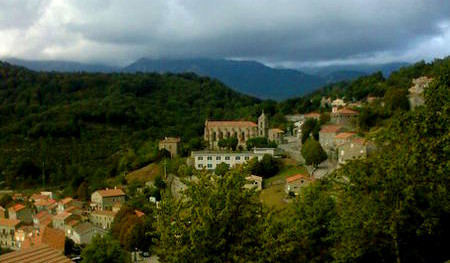
- A view of Zicavo
- Location of Zicavo
- Location within France Location within Corsica
- Coordinates: 41°54′29″N 9°07′51″E
- Country: France
- Region: Corsica
- Department: Corse-du-Sud
- Arrondissement: Ajaccio
- Canton: Taravo-Ornano
- Intercommunality: Pieve de l'Ornano

Government
  - Mayor (2020–2026): Antoine Paganelli
- Area^{1}: 93.02 km^{2} (35.92 sq mi)
- Elevation: 735 m (2,411 ft)
- Highest elevation: 2,134 m (7,001 ft)
- Lowest elevation: 380 m (1,250 ft)
- Population (2023): 203
  - Density: 2.18/km^{2} (5.65/sq mi)
- Demonym(s): Zicavais, Zicavaises
- Time zone: UTC+01:00 (CET)
  - Summer (DST): UTC+02:00 (CEST)
- INSEE/Postal code: 2A359 /20132
- ^{1} French Land Register data, which excludes lakes, ponds, glaciers > 1 km^{2} (0.386 sq mi or 247 acres) and river estuaries.

Zicavo (French pronunciation: [dzikavo]; Corsican: Zìcavu) is a commune in the Corse-du-Sud department of France on the island of Corsica.

== Population ==
Historical population

Year	Pop.	±% p.a.
1800	1,141	—
1806	1,072	−1.03%
1821	1,083	+0.07%
1831	1,249	+1.44%
1836	1,160	−1.47%
1841	1,231	+1.20%
1846	1,424	+2.96%
1851	1,380	−0.63%
1856	1,300	−1.19%
1861	1,367	+1.01%
1866	1,443	+1.09%
1872	1,642	+2.18%
1876	1,638	−0.06%
1881	1,484	−1.96%
1886	1,638	+1.99%
1891	1,618	−0.25%
1896	1,644	+0.32%
1901	1,650	+0.07%

Year	Pop.	±% p.a.
1906	1,702	+0.62%
1911	1,633	−0.82%
1921	1,539	−0.59%
1926	1,568	+0.37%
1931	1,531	−0.48%
1936	1,529	−0.03%
1946	1,524	−0.03%
1954	1,236	−2.58%
1962	454	−11.77%
1968	404	−1.93%
1975	302	−4.07%
1982	269	−1.64%
1990	245	−1.16%
1999	237	−0.37%
2007	245	+0.42%
2012	231	−1.17%
2017	229	−0.17%
2023	203	−1.99%

Source: EHESS (1800-1999) and INSEE

== Notable people ==
- Jacques Pierre Abbatucci (politician) (1791-1857)

== See also ==
- Communes of the Corse-du-Sud department
