= Auguste Nefftzer =

French journalist

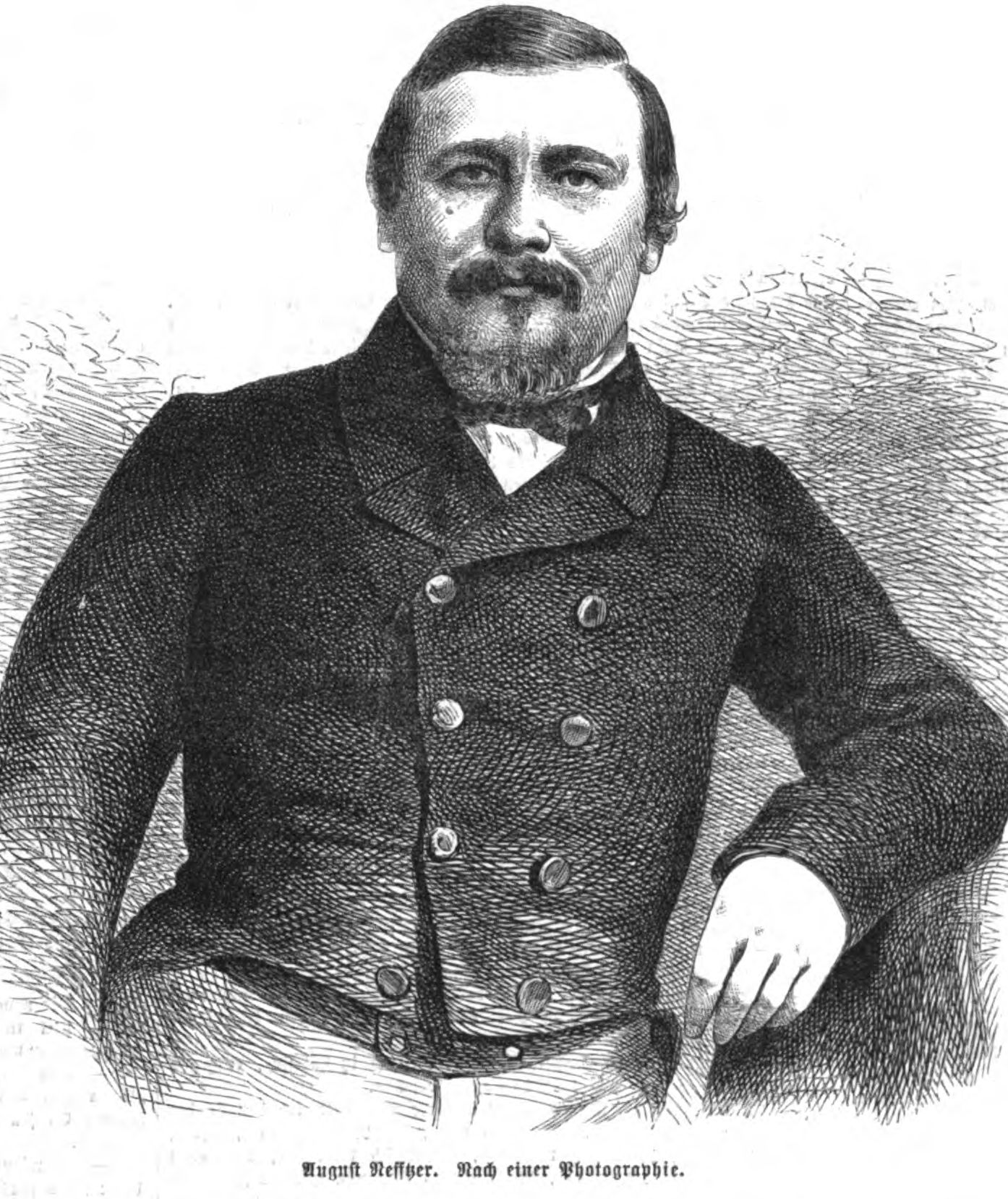
- Born: 3 February 1820; Colmar, France
- Died: 20 August 1876 (aged 56); Basel, Switzerland
- Education: Faculty of Protestant Theology, University of Strasbourg
- Occupations: Journalist, editor, publisher and translator
- Years active: 1842-1871
- Employer: La Presse
- Known for: founder of Revue Germanique in 1857 and Le Temps in 1861
- Notable work: translator of L'ami Fritz
- Successor: Adrien Hébrard at Le Temps
- Movement: French Republican opposition to the Second French Empire

Auguste Nefftzer (3 February 1820 – 20 August 1876) was a French journalist, who was known for founding the publications Revue Germanique in 1858 and Le Temps 1861, as well as his translation of Life of Jesus and L'ami Fritz. Nefftzer's writings introduced G.W.F. Hegel to France.

== Early years ==
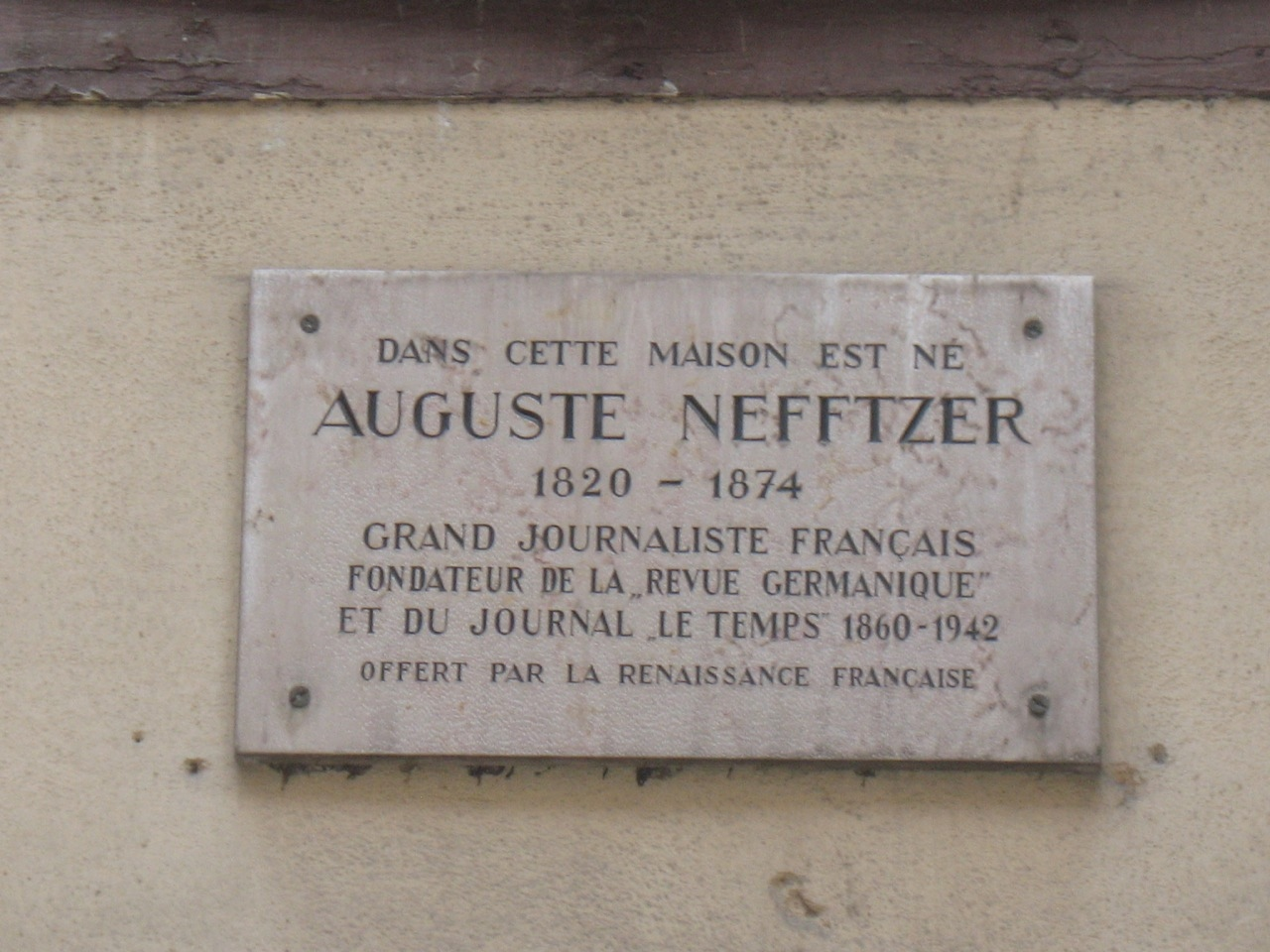
The plaque on Auguste Nefftzer's birth home located in the old city of Colmar, Alsace, France.

Auguste Nefftzer was born in Colmar, France, which is in the Haut-Rhin department of the Alsace region. The city of Colmar placed a memorial plaque on the front of Nefftzer's home, which is located in the old city. He studied Protestant theology at the University of Strasbourg. While studying theology, Nefftzer and his collaborator at the Revue Germanique, were influenced by Pastor Édouard Reuss and German criticism, which would influence their translation of Life of Jesus.

== Views ==
Auguste Nefftzer considered himself a Hegelian and was attracted to German criticism in Biblical studies.

Nefftzer summarized his political position as a liberal Republican as follows: "Anything that promotes education, work, savings and acquisition, and ownership is liberal." ("Tout ce qui favorise l'éducation, le travail, l'épargne et l'acquisition, de la propriété est libéral.")

Nefftzer was opposed to universal suffrage at a time when the right had been granted in France for males but was still controversial, and he believed the vote should be reserved for those who are capable of making decisions.

== Career ==
After his graduation, Auguste Nefftzer started his journalism career in 1842 at the Courrier du Haut-Rhin.

=== La Presse ===
Auguste Nefftzer then moved to Paris, where he was employed by Émile de Girardin in the editorial department of La Presse in 1844. In 1848, restrictions on the press were relaxed. Girardin was at first a supporter of Prince Louis-Napoléon Bonaparte before joining the opposition. His newspaper was part of the French penny press and had a large circulation of more than 50,0000. Another factor in its large circulation was the clampdown on the press by the government of the Second French Empire that allowed for only four opposition newspapers, of which La Presse was one choice. Nefftzer worked at La Presse until 1857.

While at La Presse, Nefftzer wrote a regular column about politics, foreign policy and religious issues. In 1851, Nefftzer was sentenced to one month in prison as the listed manager of the newspaper for publishing an article critical of Napoleon III. Imprisoned with him at the time at the Conciergerie was Pierre-Joseph Proudhon, Charles Hugo (son of Victor Hugo), and other journalists such as Eugene Pelletan. Nefftzer was appointed political editor of the newspaper in 1856, and he supported the leading opposition candidates in the French legislative election in February 1857. Girardin sold the newspaper in November 1857 at which time Nefftzer left.

=== Le Temps period ===
In 1858, Nefftzer founded the French-language magazine Revue Germanique (1858-1865) with Charles Dollfus. The journal was influential for introducing German thought and culture into French society.

After Napoleon III relaxed press controls in 1859, Nefftzer left the publication to found with Edmund Chojecki the influential, Parisian newspaper Le Temps in 1861. The paper was financed with money from the Dollfus and Koechlin family businesses. Nefftzer led the newspaper for the next 10 years. This newspaper reflected Nefftzer's liberal, opposition, and Protestant perspective. Under his direction, the newspaper attracted writers such as Louis Blanc, Edmond Scherer, Henri Brisson, Jules Ferry, Francisque Sarcey, Auguste Villemot, George Sand, and Alexandre Erdan.

While publishing and editing Le Temps, Nefftzer asserted the French Republican opposition views about the key events of his times. In foreign policy, he was critical of the US Confederacy and its support of slavery. In French politics, Nefftzer was instrumental in forming a coalition for the 1863 elections, called Comite de l'Union libérale, representing the Republicans, who were in favor of a parliamentary system of government. Jules Ferry's criticism of the government were published by Nefftzer in Le Temps.

Sometime after 1862, Nefftzer joined Alexandre Massol's freemason organization, La Renaissance par les Emules d'Hiram, and he employed members of the organization at Le Temps.

== Translations ==
Auguste Nefftzer was a member of a literary circle hosted by the Goncourt brothers in Paris.

During this period, Nefftzer translated coauthors Émile Erckmann and Alexandre Chatrian's novel L'ami Fritz, first published in 1864, from French to German, which was successful.

Nefftzer and Dollfus were responsible for a popular translation of David Strauss's German-language Das Leben Jesu into French (Nouvelle vie de Jésus).

== Later years ==
As a native of the Alsace region, Auguste Nefftzer supported good relations between France and Germany, which was not popular at the time of the Franco-Prussian War in 1870 and 1871. As a result, he retired from "Le Temps" after 10 years. Nefftzer retired to Basel, Switzerland where he died on 20 August 1876.
