= Senator for life (France) =

Senator elected for life under the French Third Republic

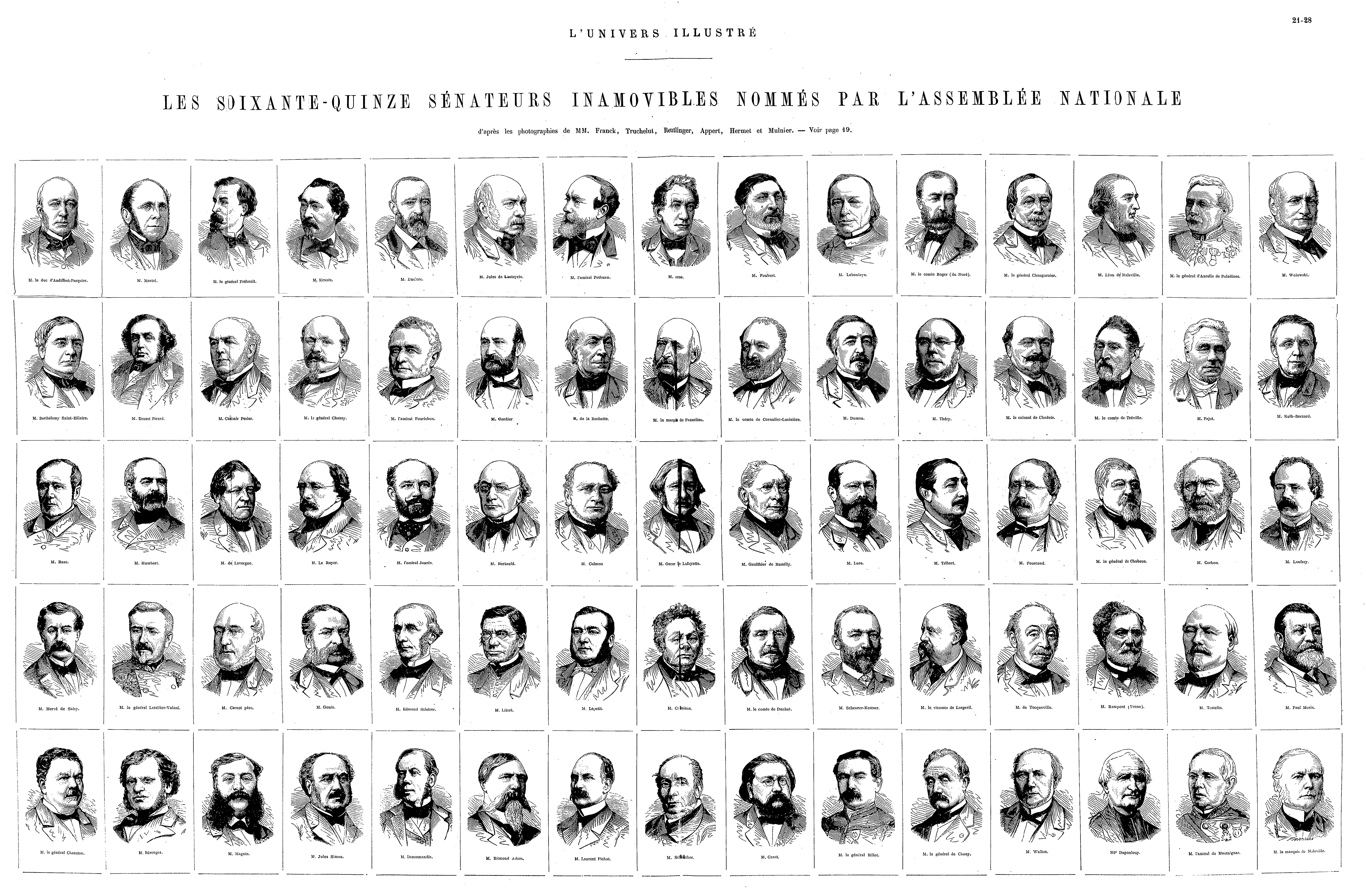
The first 75 senators for life elected at the beginning of the Third Republic

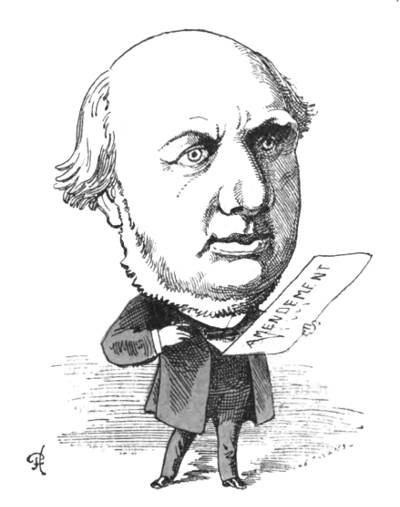
Caricature of Henri-Alexandre Wallon, father of the Third Republic, who was a senator for life from 1875 until his death in 1904.

A senator for life (French: sénateur inamovible) was an elected position under the French Third Republic, similar to that of senator for life in other countries. At one time the French Senate was composed of 300 members, of whom 75 were inamovible ("unremovable").

== History ==
Under the law of 24 February 1875 on the organization of the Senate, there were 300 members of whom 225 were elected by the departments and colonies, and 75 were elected by the National Assembly. The 75 were elected by list and by an absolute majority of votes, and were irremovable, like the members of the Chamber of Peers under the Bourbon Restoration and the July Monarchy.

If a senator for life died or resigned, the Senate would elect a replacement within two months. By the law of 10 December 1884 appointment of immovable senators ceased and the immovable senators gradually disappeared. Émile Deshayes de Marcère, the last surviving sénateur inamovible, died in 1918. Overall there were 116 lifetime senators. The first 75 had been appointed by the National Assembly and the remaining 41 by the Senate itself.

Notable immovable senators included Gaston Audiffret-Pasquier, first president of the Senate; the scientist Marcellin Berthelot, who became minister of public education and then minister of foreign affairs; Monseigneur Dupanloup; Albert Grévy, the younger brother of President Jules Grévy; Louis Martel, elected President of the Senate in 1879; Philippe Le Royer, elected President of the Senate in 1882; Auguste Scheurer-Kestner, the defender of Alfred Dreyfus; the abolitionist Victor Schœlcher and the statesman Henri-Alexandre Wallon.

== List of life senators ==
The senators for life were:

- Edmond Adam
- Édouard Allou
- Gaston Audiffret-Pasquier
- Louis d'Aurelle de Paladines
- Camille Bachasson de Montalivet
- Numa Baragnon
- Agénor Bardoux
- Ferdinand Barrot
- Jules Barthélemy-Saint-Hilaire
- Jean Didier Baze
- René Bérenger
- Alfred Bertauld
- Marcellin Berthelot
- Jean-Baptiste Billot
- Paul Broca
- Lucien Brun
- Louis Buffet
- Marc-Antoine Calmon
- Jean-Baptiste Campenon
- Joseph de Carayon Latour
- Hippolyte Carnot
- Auguste Casimir-Perier
- Jules Cazot
- François de Chabaud-Latour
- Bertrand de Chabron
- Paul de Chadois
- Nicolas Anne Théodule Changarnier
- Antoine Chanzy
- Joseph de Chareton
- Charles Chesnelong
- Jean-Jules Clamageran
- Joseph d'Haussonville
- Anthime Corbon
- Alphonse Cordier
- Hyacinthe Corne
- Hippolyte de Cornulier-Lucinière
- Ernest Courtot de Cissey
- Adolphe Crémieux
- Ernest Denormandie
- Émile Deschanel
- Émile Deshayes de Marcère
- Henry Didier
- Charles Dietz-Monnin
- Guillaume-Ferdinand de Douhet
- Eugène Duclerc
- Jules Armand Dufaure
- Jean-Baptiste Dumon
- Félix Dupanloup
- Henri Dupuy de Lôme
- Jean-Joseph Farre
- Paul Foubert
- Émile Fourcand
- Martin Fourichon
- Charles Frébault
- Louis Gaulthier de Rumilly
- Eugène Goüin
- Théodore Grandperret
- Henri Greffulhe
- Henri François Xavier Gresley
- Albert Grévy
- Léonce Guilhaud de Lavergne
- Gustave Humbert
- Bernard Jauréguiberry
- Benjamin Jaurès
- Charles Kolb-Bernard
- Sébastien Krantz
- Léon Lalanne
- Pierre Lanfrey
- Roger de Larcy
- Jules de Lasteyrie du Saillant
- Léon Laurent-Pichat
- Édouard René de Laboulaye
- Oscar de La Fayette
- Victor Lefranc
- John Lemoinne
- Alphonse Lepetit
- Philippe Le Royer
- Charles Letellier-Valazé
- Émile Littré
- Hippolyte de Lorgeril
- Victor Luro
- Jean Macé
- Pierre-Joseph Magnin
- Léon de Maleville
- Guillaume de Maleville
- Louis Martel
- Louis Raymond de Montaignac de Chauvance
- Paul Morin
- Jules Pajot
- Charles Paul Alexandre de Pasquier de Franclieu
- Eugène Pelletan
- Alexandre Peyron
- Ernest Picard
- Ernest Poictevin de La Rochette
- Louis Pierre Alexis Pothau
- Edmond de Pressensé
- Germain Rampont
- Charles Renouard
- Amable Ricard
- Édouard Roger du Nord
- Hervé de Saisy de Kérampuil
- Edmond Henri Adolphe Schérer
- Auguste Scheurer-Kestner
- Victor Schœlcher
- Jules Simon
- Achille Testelin
- Antoine Théry
- Pierre Tirard
- Hippolyte Clérel de Tocqueville
- Bernard-Louis Calouin de Tréville
- Louis Tribert
- Oscar de Vallée
- Étienne de Voisins-Lavernière
- Henri-Alexandre Wallon
- Louis Wolowski
- Charles Adolphe Wurtz

== Later systems ==
In 2005, the senator Patrice Gélard and others tabled a bill for a constitutional amendment granting former presidents of France a life seat in the Senate, instead of one on the Constitutional Council. This proposal was, however, not enacted.

== Sources ==
- Les sénateurs inamovibles (in French), Senate of France
- Liste des anciens sénateurs de la IIIème République par circonscription : Inamovible (in French), Senat de France
