= Édouard René de Laboulaye =

French politician (1811–1883)

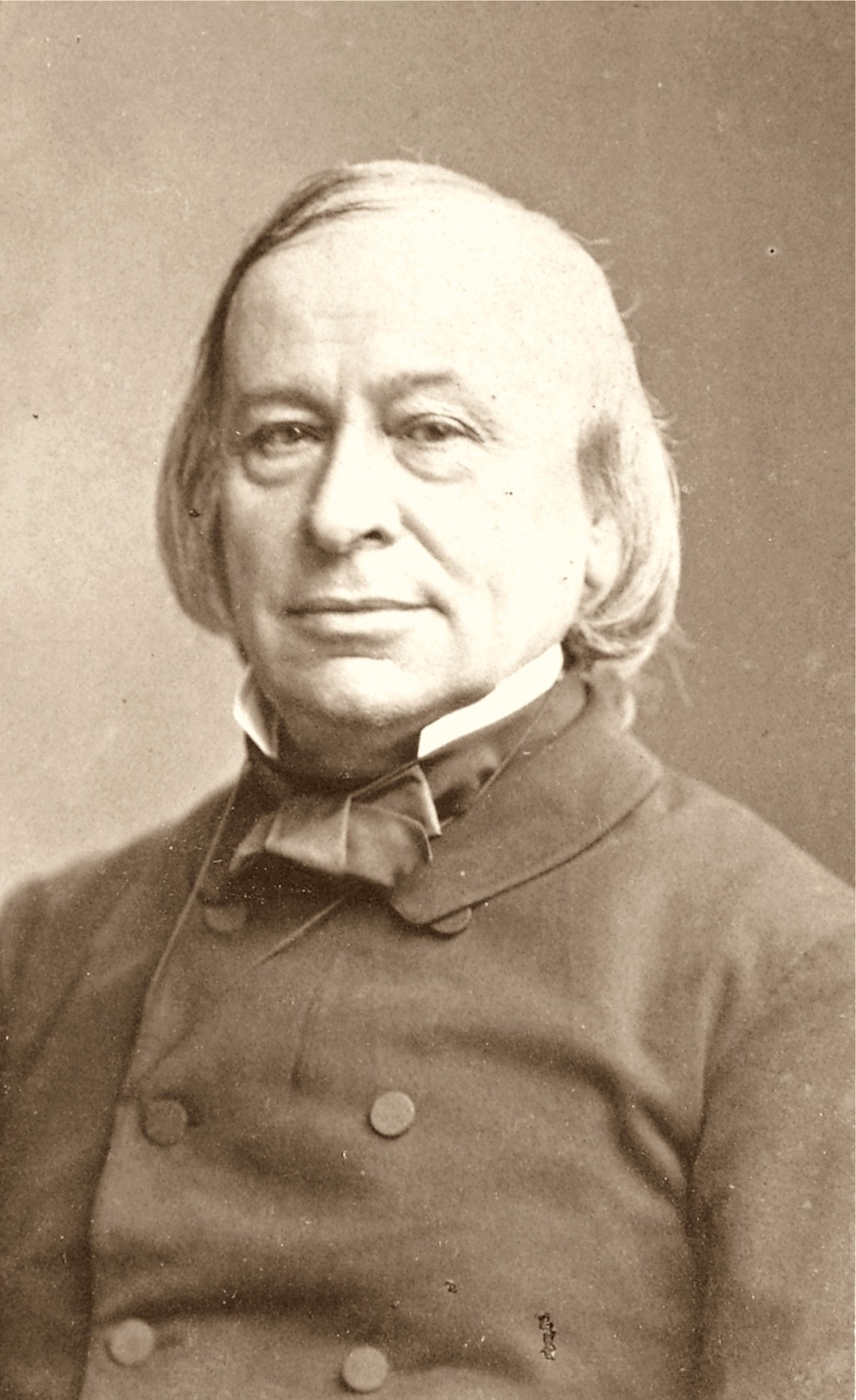

Administrator of the Collège de France
- In office 1876 – 25 May 1883

Senator for life
- In office 1875 – 25 May 1883

Personal details
- Born: 18 January 1811 Paris, France
- Died: 25 May 1883 (aged 72) Paris, France
- Spouses: Augusta Virginia Paradise (m. 1832–1841); Alexandrine Louise Valerie Michelin-Tronsson du Coudray
- Children: Paulin de Laboulaye

Édouard René Lefèbvre de Laboulaye (French: [edwaʁ ʁəne ləfɛvʁ də labulɛ]; 18 January 1811 – 25 May 1883) was a French jurist, poet, author and anti-slavery activist. An attentive observer of the political life of the United States and admirer of the American constitution, he originated the idea of a statue presented by the French people to the United States that resulted in the Statue of Liberty in New York Harbor.

== Life ==
Laboulaye was received at the bar in 1842, and was chosen professor of comparative law at the Collège de France in 1849. Following the Paris Commune of 1870, he was elected to the national assembly, representing the departement of the Seine. As secretary of the committee of thirty on the constitution he was effective in combatting the Monarchists in establishing the Third Republic. In 1875, he was elected a life senator, and in 1876 he was appointed administrator of the Collège de France, resuming his lectures on comparative legislation in 1877. Laboulaye was also chairman of the French Anti-Slavery Society and president of the Société d'économie politique.

Always a careful observer of the politics of the United States, and an admirer of its constitution, he wrote a three-volume work on the political history of the United States, and published it in Paris during the height of the politically repressed Second Empire. During the American Civil War, he was a zealous advocate of the Union cause and the abolition of slavery, publishing histories of the cultural connections of the two nations. At the war's conclusion in 1865, he became president of the French Emancipation Committee that aided newly freed slaves in the U.S. The same year he had the idea of presenting a statue representing liberty as a gift to the United States, a symbol for ideas suppressed by Napoleon III. The sculptor Frédéric Auguste Bartholdi, one of Laboulaye's friends, turned the idea into reality.

== Writing ==
Laboulaye wrote poetry in his spare time. One of his poems, "L'Oiseau bleu" was set by Victor Massé. Laboulaye also translated into French the autobiography of Benjamin Franklin and the works of Unitarian theologian William Ellery Channing.

Laboulaye published many books. Those relating to the United States include:

- Political History of the United States (3 vols., 1855–1866)
- The United States and France (1862)
- Paris en Amerique (1863) translated into English by Mary Louise Booth
- The Poodle-Prince (Le Prince Caniche) (1868) translated into English by Mary Robinson in 1895 (ISBN 978-2-37037-002-0)

== Popular culture ==
- Laboulaye was an important historical figure in the 2007 film National Treasure: Book of Secrets.

== See also ==
- Laboulaye, Córdoba, a city in Argentina named in his honour.

== References and further reading ==
- John Bigelow (1889). Some Recollections of the Late Edouard Laboulaye. New York: G.P. Putnam's Sons.
- Yasmin Sabina Khan (2010). Enlightening the World: The Creation of the Statue of Liberty. Cornell University Press. p. 40. ISBN 978-0-8014-4851-5.
- Frédéric Passy (1884). Édouard Laboulaye: conférence faite à la Société du travail (in French). Paris: Guillaumin.
- Walter Dennis Gray (1994). Interpreting American Democracy in France: The Career of Édouard Laboulaye, 1811-1883. Newark: University of Delaware Press. ISBN 0-87413-461-7.
- James Grant Wilson; John Fiske, eds. (1888). "Laboulaye, Édouard René de". Appletons' Cyclopædia of American Biography. Vol. 3. D. Appleton & Co. pp. 581–582.
- Oscar Fay Adams (1889). "Édouard René de Laboulaye". Dear Old Story-teller. Boston: D. Lothrop Company. p. 125. (short biography of life and works)
- James Guida (6 April 2019). "The Sly Modernity of Édouard Laboulaye's Fairy Tales". New York Review of Books.
