= Athanase Bassinet =

French politician

Athanase-Henri Bassinet
- Born: 16 May 1850; Chantôme, Indre, France
- Died: 12 February 1914 (aged 63); Paris, France
- Occupation: Public works contractor
- Known for: Senator

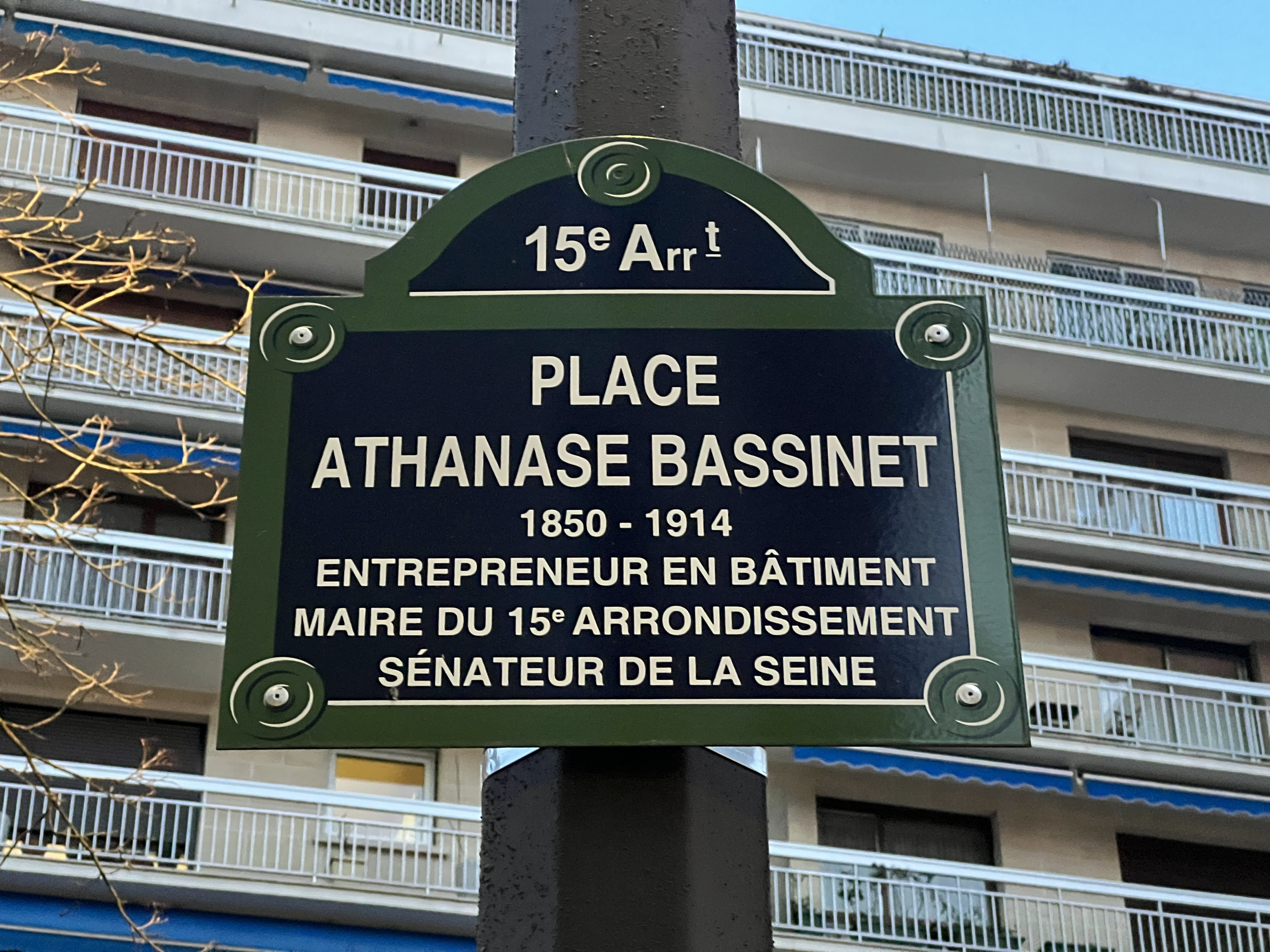
A plaque at the Place Athanase Bassinet in Paris

Athanase-Henri Bassinet (16 May 1850 - 12 February 1914) was a laborer who entered politics and became a senator of France from 1899 to 1914.

== Early years ==
Athanase-Henri Bassinet was born in Chantôme, Indre, on 16 May 1850. His family was in modest circumstances. While very young he went to Paris to work as a laborer. He became a mason's assistant, rose to become a foreman and then became a public works contractor. He served in the forces of the Seine in the Franco-Prussian War of 1870-71.

In the election of 27 April 1873 Bassinet was an active member of the Jobbé-Duval committee that supported the candidacy of the Radical Republican Désiré Barodet in the 16th arrondissement of Paris. In 1876 he founded a Republican circle, which was dissolved during the 16 May 1877 crisis. He was elected a councilor of Paris on 15 May 1887 and sat on the Radical Socialist benches. He was re-elected in 1890 and 1893. Bassinet was elected vice-president of the General Council of the Seine for the 1893-1894 session, and President for the session that followed.

== Senator ==
Bassinet won a Senate seat in the by-election of 12 February 1899, replacing Lucien Brun, a permanent Senator who had died. He was reelected in the general elections of 28 January 1900 and 3 January 1909. As part of the Democratic Left, Bassinet was dedicated to improving the lot of workers. He often spoke on budgetary issues.

In 1899 Bassinet was involved in discussions about a telephone network in the South West of Paris (1899). In 1901 he spoke on the Finance Act and relief to flood victims in the 5th and 13th arrondissements. In 1902 he called for reconstruction of the National Printing Office. In 1904 he debated a loan of 200 million to the Department of the Seine, and the "March of the Army". This was a military competition organized by the newspaper Le Matin. The Galerie des machines built for the Exposition Universelle (1889) was transformed into a kind of vast encampment in which the marchers would rest, eat, and also perform. Bassinet voted for the 1905 French law on the Separation of the Churches and the State proposed by Aristide Briand that guaranteed freedom of worship. Bassinet discussed a loan for organizing the gas service (1905), creation of a national school of Arts and Crafts in Paris (1906), recruitment for the army (1910) and expropriation for public utility (1911).

Athanase Bassinet died on 12 February 1914 in Paris. The next day President Antonin Dubost delivered his eulogy in the Senate.
