= Félix Dubois =

French journalist and explorer (1862–1945)

Albert Félix Dubois
- Félix Dubois in Timbuktu in 1907
- Born: 16 September 1862; Dresden, Saxony
- Died: 1 June 1945 (aged 82); Paris, France
- Occupations: Journalist; explorer
- Known for: Timbuctoo: the mysterious

Albert Félix Dubois (16 September 1862 – 1 June 1945) was a French journalist, explorer and entrepreneur who is best known for his books about his travels in French West Africa.

Dubois was the son of a well-known chef who had written a number of popular cookery books. He began his career as the European correspondent in Berlin and Vienna for several French newspapers. In 1890 he went to Guinea to report on an exploratory expedition. He later wrote reports on Palestine and on anarchism. In 1894 he was one of the reporters sent to the newly occupied city of Timbuktu. His experiences were described in a popular book in 1896. He was sent to report on another expedition in West Africa in 1897, but left in disgust due to the brutality of the commander, who was killed shortly after. In 1898 Dubois conceived the idea of launching the first general freight company to use trucks, avoiding the need for porters in the French Sudan and also turning a profit. The venture ran into many difficulties and collapsed in 1900.

Dubois spent several years in Paris before embarking on another expedition in 1907, this time crossing the Sahara from north to south. He found relics of ancient civilizations in the Hoggar Mountains of southern French Algeria, but was unable to take the time to explore them properly. After marrying an heiress with whom he had five children, he embarked on unsuccessful business ventures in Siberia, the Altai and Alberta, Canada. He wrote several books about his travels.

== Early years ==
Dubois was born on 16 September 1862 in Dresden, Saxony. His father, Urbain Dubois, was a famous chef from Provence. His mother, Marie Virginie Boder, was from Neuchâtel in Switzerland. His father returned to France when the Franco-Prussian War started in 1870. Felix and his younger brother Ernest studied at the college of Melun from 1873 to 1880, and then at the School of Commerce in Paris from 1880 to 1882. Felix then spent one year of military service at Dreux before becoming a journalist.

== Journalist ==
His father's connections made him welcome in Berlin and Vienna, where he became correspondent for several French journals, including Le Soleil, La France, Le Gaulois and Le Petit Marseillais. In 1890 L'Illustration asked him to accompany and report on the expedition led by Henri Brosselard-Faidherbe to explore Guinea and the sources of the Niger River. The expedition established the route of a railway line from the Mellacorée River to Kankan, and defined the border between the new colony of French Guinea and the British colony of Sierra Leone. Dubois's report appeared in L'Illustration in 1892. He then undertook a journey to Palestine for Le Figaro, which he described in an article on Nöel en Bethléem (Christmas in Bethlehem). In 1894 he published Le péril anarchiste (The Anarchist Peril), a work that was not entirely serious.

French forces led by Joseph Joffre entered Timbuktu on 12 February 1894. L'illustration sent two senior reporters, Dubois and Jules Huret. Dubois reached Dakar in October 1894, and traveled by railway, then by steam boat, by land, and by boat on the Niger to Kabara, the port for Timbuktu. On the way, he met Ernest Noirot, the administrator of the Sine-Saloum circle in Senegal. He admired Noirot's approach to administering Sine-Saloum, and particularly his schools, providing elementary French education, introducing new crops (maize, vegetables and European berries), introducing the students and their parents to the use of the plow. Dubois described Noirot as a modest secular missionary. Dubois thought that the Fula people of Senegal had been driven from Adrar, to the north, by the Moors, who had in turn been driven from Spain.

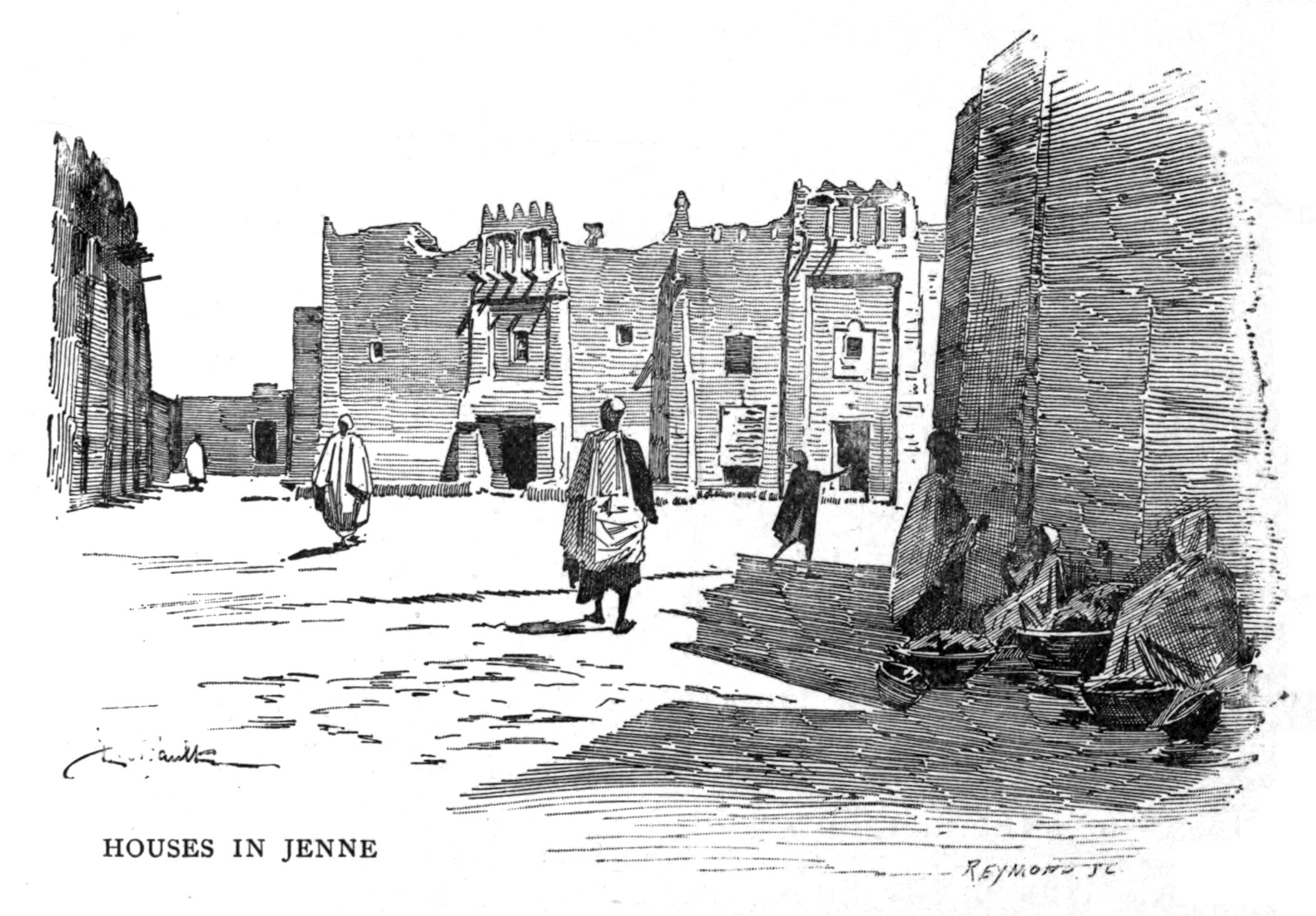
Houses in Djenné, from Timbuctoo: the mysterious

Further east, Dubois found the Songhai people near Djenné quite different ethnically from others in the region. They told him they had originally come from the east, and Dubois decided from his research that they might have come from Yemen. Dubois found similarities between the houses in Djenné and the tombs of Ancient Egypt, and visual similarities between the Songhai and Nubian people, and speculated that the town could also have originally been an Upper Egyptian colony. On the other hand, he wrote of these people:

A wonderful impulse was imparted to this country in the sixteenth century, and a marvellous civilisation appeared in the very heart of the black continent. This civilisation was not imposed by circumstances and force, as is so often the case, even in our own countries, but was spontaneously desired, evoked, and propagated by a man of the negro races. Unfortunately, its fairest promises were never fulfilled, owing, not so much to the native successors, as to the civilised (some say white) peoples who ruthlessly destroyed all this good seed, and caused the tares of barbarism to sprout anew.

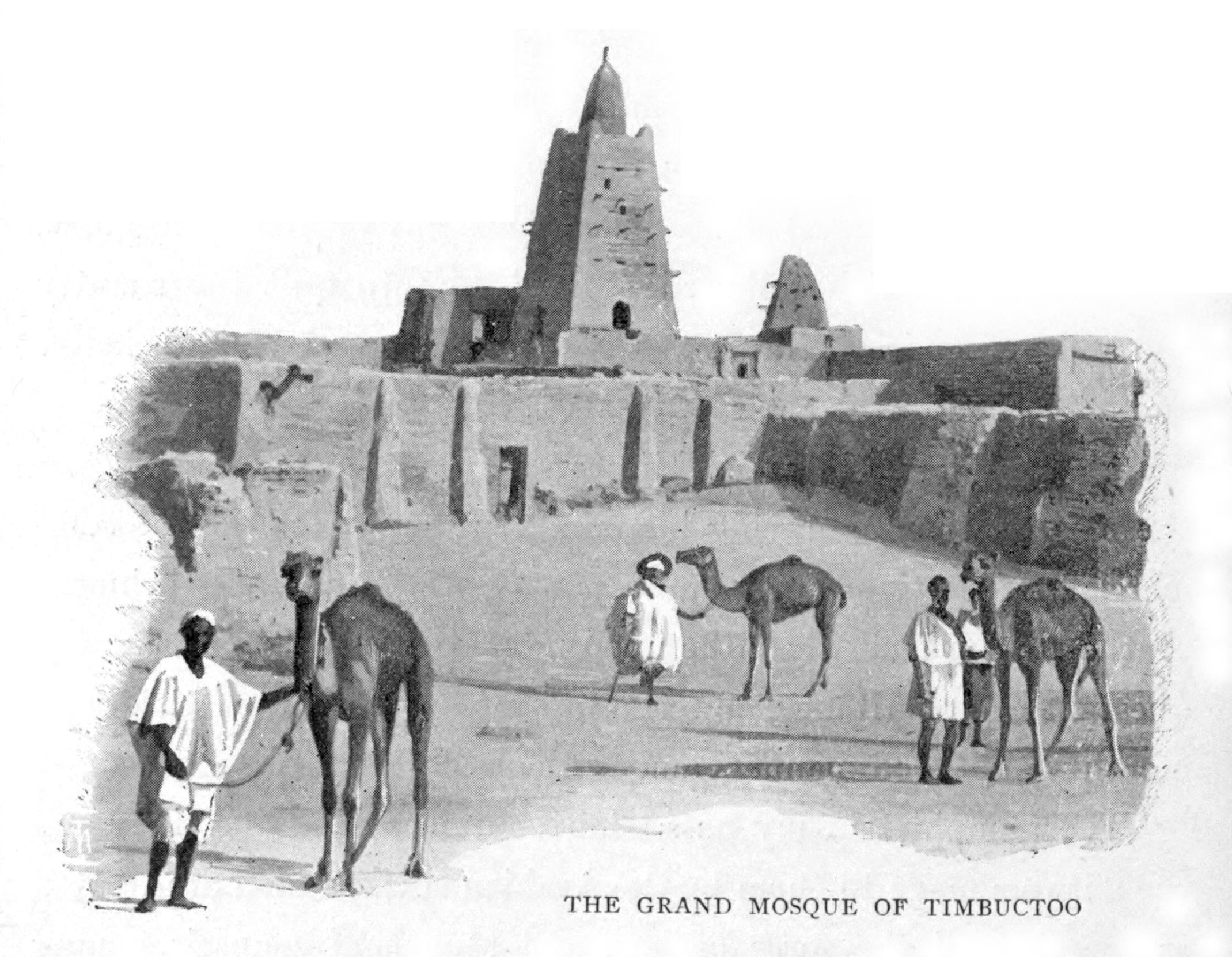
The Grand Mosque or Djingareyber Mosque in Timbuktu, from Timbuctoo: the mysterious

Dubois spent several weeks in Timbuktu making notes and taking photographs. These formed the basis for his 1897 book Tombouctou la Mystérieuse (Timbuctoo: the mysterious). He admitted that Timbuktu lacked impressive buildings, but put this down to lack of suitable materials. He went on, "Unable, therefore, to develop the sensuous arts, Timbuctoo reserved all her strength for the intellectual, and here her dominion was supreme." He described a "University of Sankore" in Timbuktu. (Note: There was no formal "University of Sankore". Many scholars lived in the Sankore quarter, but teaching was done mostly in the homes of the shaykhs, or to a lesser extent in the mosques.) Talking of an earlier period in the history of the town, he says,

The scholars of Timbuctoo yielded in nothing, to the saints and their miracles. During their sojourns in the foreign universities of Fez, Tunis and Cairo, 'they astonished the most learned men of Islam by their erudition.' That these negroes were on a level with the Arabian savants is proved by the fact that they were installed as professors in Morocco and Egypt. In contrast to this, we find that the Arabs were not always equal to the requirements of Sankoré.

In 1897 Dubois was recruited by the French colonial authorities to accompany a military expedition under Captain Marius Gabriel Cazemajou to reach Chad before the British. In his race against time Cazamajou drove the porters ruthlessly and shot those who tried to escape. Dubois fell out with Cazamajou over these methods and left the expedition at Say. A few weeks later Cazamajou was killed at Zinder. Dubois travelled home via Dahomey, reaching France in 1898.

== Entrepreneur ==
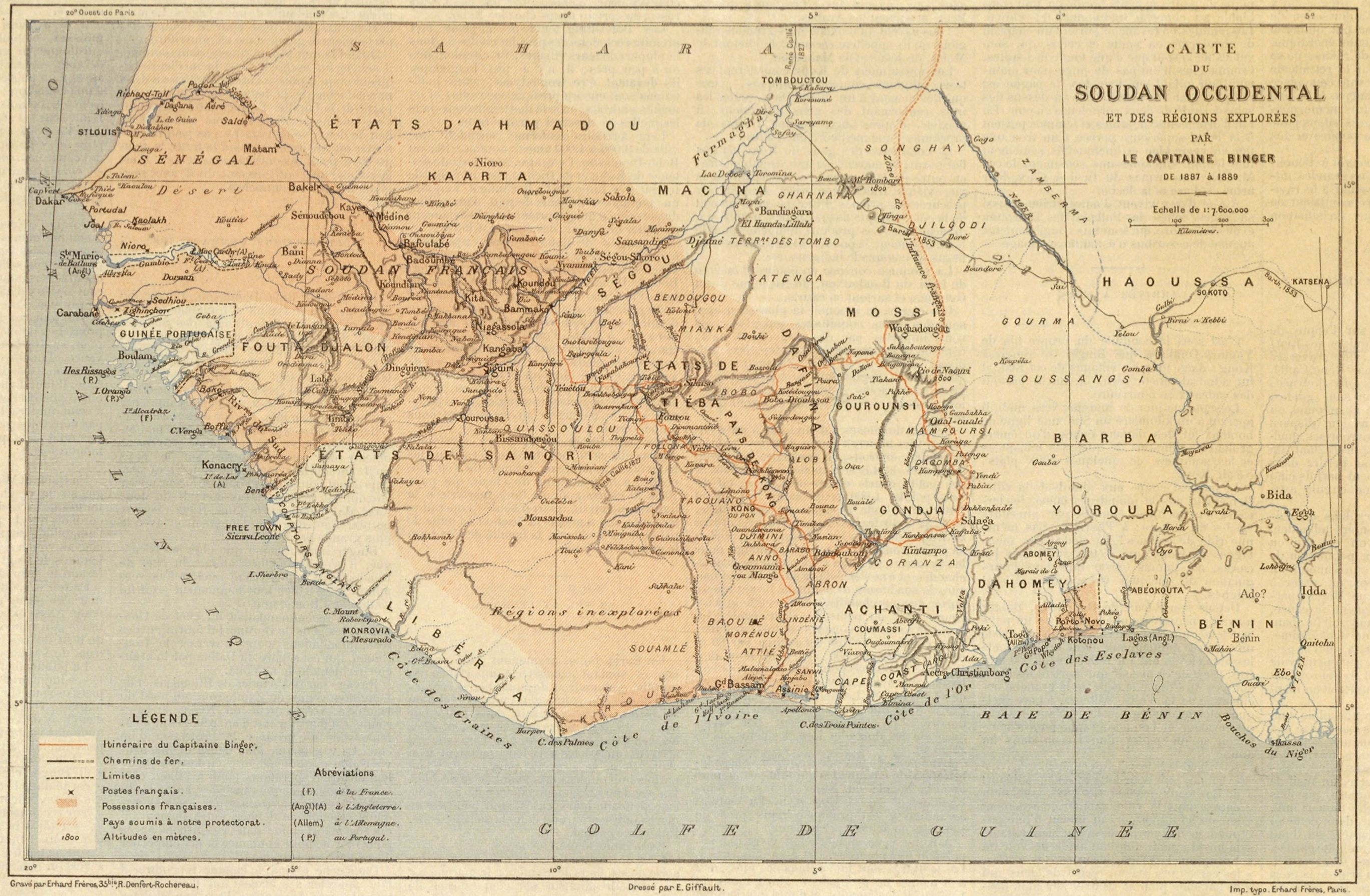
Map of French West Africa published in Le Temps in March 1890 to illustrate an account of the 1887–1889 voyage of Captain Louis Gustave Binger

In the fall of 1898 Dubois attended an exhibition of cars and bicycles which gave him the idea of introducing motorized wagons into the French Sudan in place of porters. A private company with good connections with the colonial authorities could make a profit while helping the people of the region. He obtained financial backing to explore the concept further and launched "Dubois et Cie" for this purpose. On 16 December 1898 the first truck was landed at Kayes in a ceremony attended by the governor Colonel Edgard de Trentinian.

Trials showed that the state of the roads was the key factor in making a success of the enterprise. With agreement from Trentinian that the roads could be maintained, Dubois returned to France to raise further support and funds. He founded the SOUDAUTO company with 100,000 francs of his own and with total capital of 1,200,000 francs. The colony would maintain the road between Toukoto and Bamako at its own expense, while the company would provide 85 trucks. The total distance between Kayes and Bamako was 400 kilometres (250 mi). The service would commence no later than March 1900. Dubois promised that the investors would receive a good return.

When he returned to Sudan with the first vehicles, Dubois found many problems. Trentinian had been removed from office, the local authorities were hostile to the enterprise, the European staff and Chinese drivers were incompetent and became ill, the roads had deteriorated from overuse and poor maintenance, and there was an epidemic of yellow fever. Despite all this, Dubois managed to deploy 55 vehicles with fuel drums, and made a symbolic journey from Kati to Bamako on 1 January 1900 that was widely reported in the international press. This enterprise was the first in which trucks were used to haul general freight. His vehicles were De Dietrich 9.5 horsepower wagons with gasoline engines, built at Lunéville, France.

Sand from the unpaved road penetrated the working parts, which soon ground to a halt. The company collapsed. Its property in the Sudan was seized and court cases dragged out while the vehicles stood idle. The failure was finally resolved in December 1913. Dubois lost all his money but retained his reputation, and in 1900 was special commissioner for the French Sudan at the Exposition Universelle. His father died in 1901. Dubois inherited some of the royalty rights to his father's books, and made fairly profitable investments with the capital. For the next few years he was able to live comfortably and take part in the social life of Paris.

== Trans-Saharan expedition ==
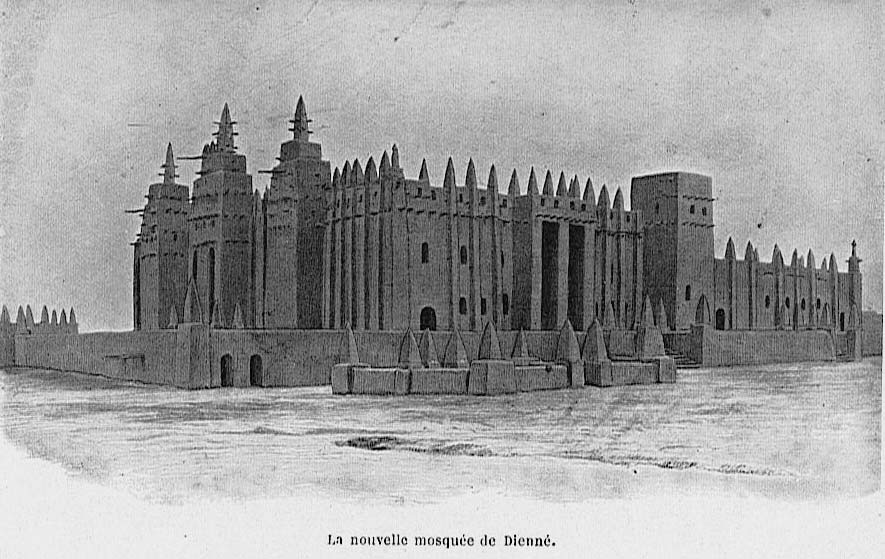
The Great Mosque of Djenné was built in 1906–1907 on the ruins of an earlier mosque. This view shows the north east corner. From Dubois's Notre beau Niger (1911)

In 1907, at the age of 45, Dubois was assigned another official mission in Africa, to cross the Sahara without escort from Algeria to the Sudan. The expedition was supported by various government departments as well as the Comité de l’Afrique française, the Société de Géographie and the Société de Géographie commerciale. Dubois was to study the people of the Sahara, the conditions of the region and the possibility of establishing regular commercial contacts between Algeria and Sudan. His camel party left Biskra on 9 April 1907 and traveled to the Grand Erg Occidental. He met General François-Henry Laperrine in Taghouzi, reached Adrar in Tuat on 11 June 1907, and reached the In Salah oasis on 29 July. In October 1907 he met Father Charles de Foucauld at Tamanrasset in southern Algeria.

Dubois made a series of archaeological finds in the Hoggar Mountains of southern Algeria near Tamanrasset. These included the first known drawing of a chariot in the region, funerary monuments and rock art. He did not publish the work, which was unknown until recently. He was fascinated by his findings of traces of ancient civilization, and dreamed of returning with a better equipped expedition to undertake a more careful and focused study of the topography, archaeology and ethnography of the region.

From the Hoggar Mountains Dubois's route took him south to Gao, then west to Timbuktu, which was now a quiet colonial town, and from there up the Niger to Koulikoro and then by train to Kayes. His last book Notre beau Niger (1911) celebrated the social and economic benefits that the French colonial rule had brought to West Africa. In his view, the French had done better than other colonialists in Africa because they were averse to color prejudice. Dubois felt that the railway and benefits of French administration would help the Sudan recover its former glory. Notre Beau Niger was perhaps over-enthusiastic, designed to raise interest in the colony within France. His account of his travel in the desert, L'enigme du Sahara, was advertised as due to appear after Notre Beau Niger. It was never published.

== Later career ==
On his return to France, on 24 March 1908 Dubois married Louise Tribert, 30-year-old daughter of Senator Louis Tribert (1819–1899). They were to have five children. His wife's dowry allowed Dubois to pursue further ventures. In January 1913 he launched a company with a capital of 6 million gold roubles to exploit the resources of the Kuznetsk Basin in Siberia. He also became involved in diamond mines in the Altai. Long after the revolution of 1917 swept the Tsars from power, Dubois entertained hopes of recovering these investments. During World War I he traveled to Canada, where he became interested in the Alberta oilfields, and continued to invest in this area until at least 1925, again losing his money.

His wife died in 1933. Félix Dubois died on 1 June 1945 at the age of 82. He was cremated in a private ceremony at Père Lachaise Cemetery in Paris.

== Works ==
Books

- Dubois, Félix (1893). La Vie au Continent Noire (in French). Riou, Édouard (illustrator). Paris: J. Hetzel.
- Dubois, Félix (1894). Le Péril anarchiste. L'organisation secrète du parti anarchiste. Origines et historique. La propagande anarchiste, etc (in French). Paris: E. Flammarion.
- Dubois, Félix; Derechef, Ralph (1894). The Anarchist Peril ... Translated, Edited and Enlarged with a Supplementary Chapter by R. Derechef. London: T. F. Unwin.
- Dubois, Félix (1896). Timbuctoo: the mysterious. White, Diana (translator). New York: Longmans.
- Dubois, Félix (1897). Tombouctou la Mystérieuse (in French). Paris: E. Flammarion.
- Dubois, Félix (1911). Notre Beau Niger: Quinze années de Colonisation Français (in French). Paris: Flammarion.

Articles

- Dubois, Félix (3 December 1892). "Noël en Terre-Sainte: Illustrations de F. de Haenen". L'Illustration (in French) (2592).
- Dubois, Félix (13 February 1893). "Figaro à Panama". Le Figaro (in French). p. 1.
- Dubois, Félix (2 March 1893). "Figaro à Panama". Le Figaro, Supplément Spécial (in French).
- Dubois, Félix (7 June 1893). "Les Anglais en Égypte". Le Figaro (in French). p. 3.
- Dubois, Félix (13 January 1894). "Le Péril Anarchiste". Le Figaro, Supplément Littéraire (in French).
- Dubois, Félix (27 July 1895). "Figaro à Tombouctou". Le Figaro, Supplément Illustré (in French).
- Dubois, Félix (1898). "Retour du Niger". Bulletin du Comité de l'Afrique française (in French): 174–177.
- Dubois, Félix (1898). "Vocabulaire songhoï". Bulletin du Comité de l'Afrique française (in French): 177–178.
- Dubois, Félix (11 February 1911). "Le Livre du Jour: Notre Beaux Niger". Le Figaro, Supplément Littéraire (in French). p. 4.
