= John Lemoinne =

French journalist (1815–1892)

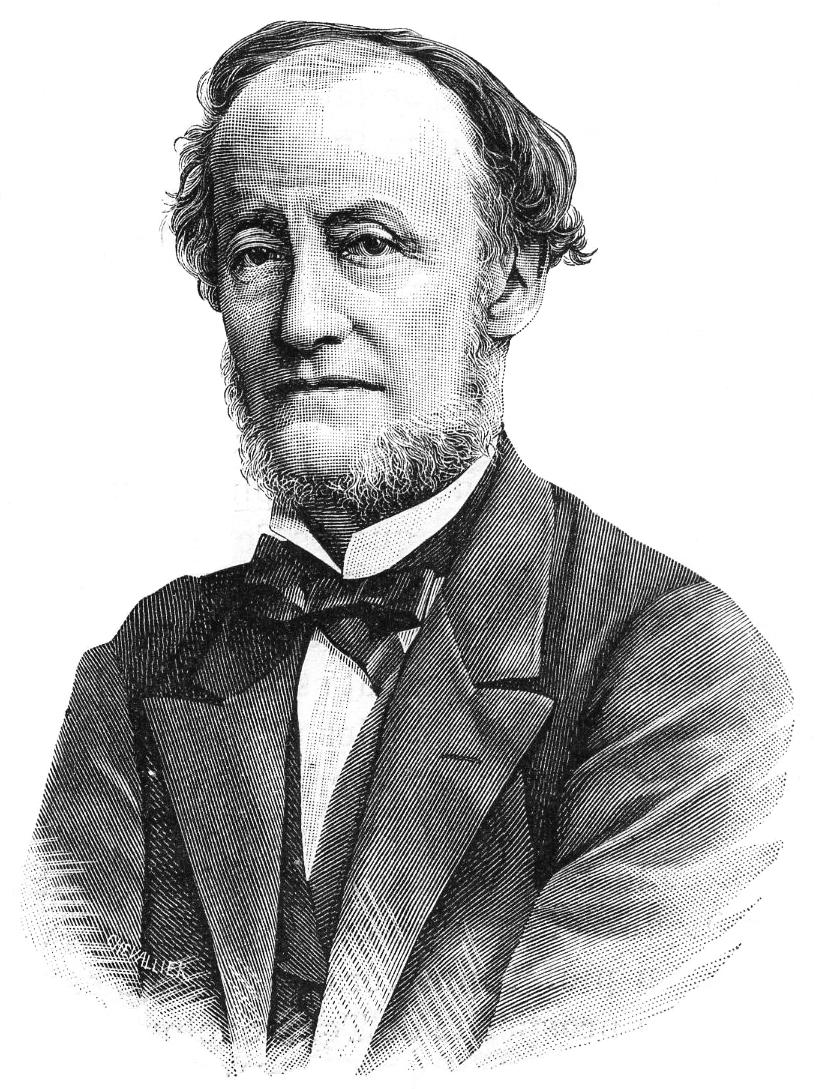
John Lemoinne

John-Marguerite-Émile Lemoinne (17 October 1815 – 14 December 1892) was a French journalist.

== Personal and public life ==
=== Early years ===
Lemoinne was born of French parents in London. He was educated first at an English school and then in France. In 1840 he began writing for the Journal des débats, on English and other foreign questions, and under the empire he held up to admiration the free institutions of England by contrast with imperial methods. After 1871 he supported Thiers, but his sympathies rather tended towards a liberalized monarchy, until the comte de Chambord's policy made such a development an impossibility, and he then ranged himself with the moderate republicans.

=== Career ===
In 1875 Lemoinne was elected to the Académie française, and in 1880 he was nominated a life senator. Distinguished though he was for a real knowledge of England among the French journalists who wrote on foreign affairs, his tone towards English policy greatly changed in later days, and though he never shared the extreme French bitterness against England as regards Egypt, he maintained a critical attitude which served to stimulate French Anglophobia. He was a frequent contributor to the Revue des deux mondes, and published several books, the best known of which is his Études critiques et biographiques (1862).

=== Personal life ===
Lemoinne died in Paris in 1892.

== Works ==
- Les Élections en Angleterre, lettres publiées dans le "Journal des débats". Paris: J. Hetzel, 1841
- Les Anglais dans le Caboul. Paris: au bureau de la Revue des deux mondes, 1842
- Affaires de Rome. Paris: E. Blanchard, 1850
- Letters of John Lemoinne [on the Exhibition held in London in 1851]. In: Lardner, Dionysius The Great Exhibition, etc. 1852
- Études critiques et biographiques: Études critiques: Shakspeare, l'abbé Prévost, Goethe ...; Études biographiques: Brummel, O'Connel, Robert Peel, Haydon, Chateaubriand.... Paris, 1852
- De l'intégrité de l'empire ottoman. Paris: M. Lévy frères, 1853
- Le Passage du Nord. Strasbourg: Treuttel et Würtz, 1854
- Nouvelles études critiques et biographiques. Paris: Michel Lévy frères, 1863
- "La colonie anglaise". In: Paris Guide, 1868; Foreigners in Paris, Berlin: Readux Books, 2016
- Histoire de Manon Lescaut et du chevalier DesGrieux par l’abbé Prévost. Nouv. éd. précédée d’une étude par John Lemoinne. Paris: Levy, 1900
