= Charles Chesnelong =

French politician

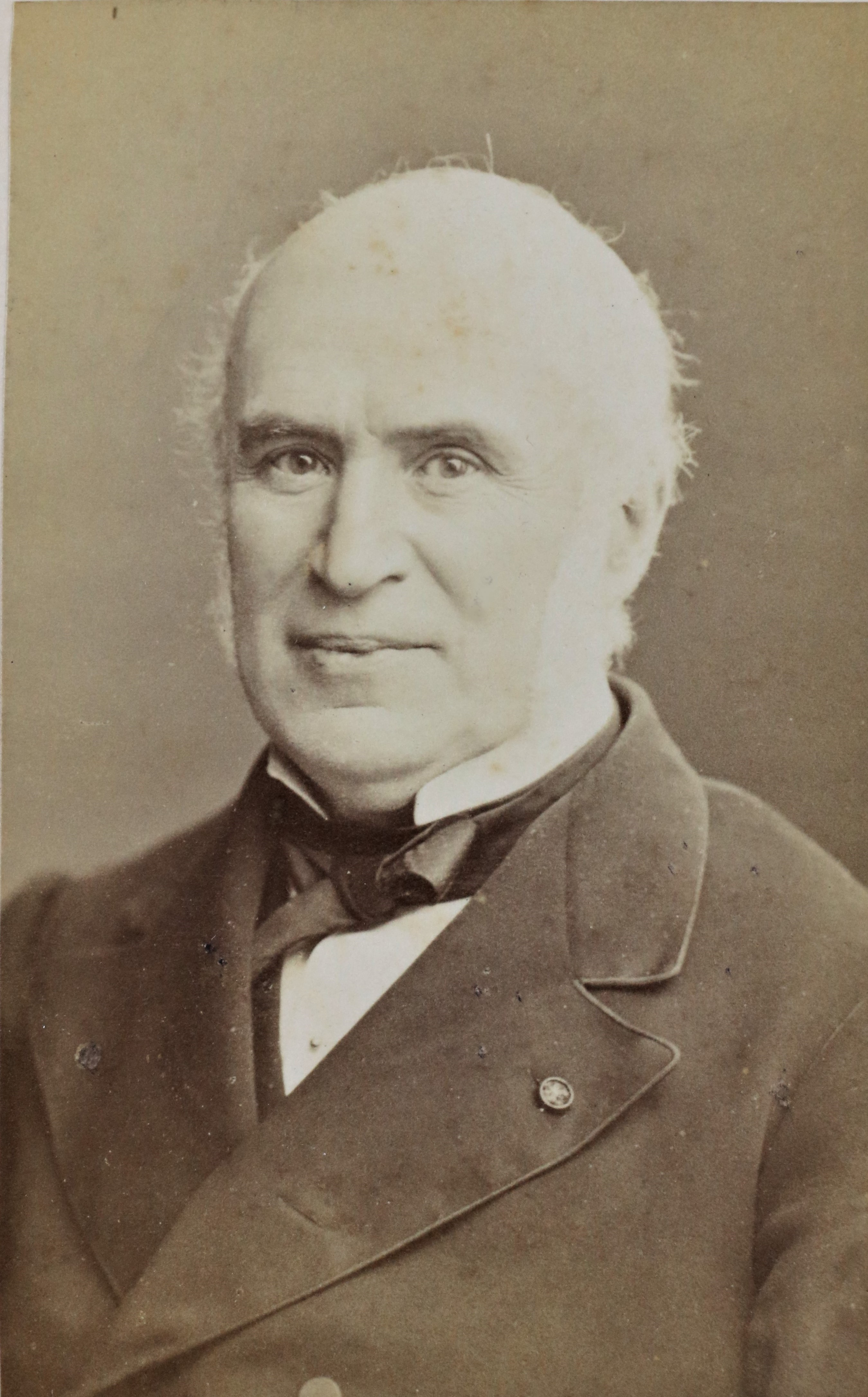
Pierre Charles Chesnelong

Pierre Charles Chesnelong (24 April 1820 – 22 July 1899) was a French politician, born at Orthez in the département of the Basses-Pyrénées.

== In the Second Empire ==
In 1848, during the French uprising, he proclaimed himself a Republican; but, after the establishment of the Second Empire, he changed his views, and in 1865 was returned to the Chamber of Deputies as the official candidate for his native place. He at once became conspicuous, both for his eloquence and for his uncompromising clericalism, especially in urging the necessity for maintaining the temporal power of the papacy.

In 1869 he was again returned, and, devoting himself to financial questions, was in 1870 appointed to report the budget. During and after the Franco-Prussian War, for which he voted, he retired for a while into private life; but in 1872 he was again elected deputy, this time as a Legitimist, and took his seat among the conservative Right of the French Third Republic.

== In the Republic ==
He was the soul of the reactionary opposition that led to the fall of Adolphe Thiers; in 1873, it was he who, with Lucien Brun, carried the proposals of the Chambers to the Bourbon claimant Comte de Chambord. Through some misunderstanding, he reported on his return that the count had accepted all the terms offered, including the retention of the drapeau tricolore - the Count published a formal denial, which brought about his own downfall.

Chesnelong now devoted himself to the establishment of Roman Catholic universities and to the formation of Roman Catholic working-men's clubs (to combat the trade unionism of various socialists). In 1876 he was again returned for Orthez, but was unseated, and then beaten by the Republican candidate. On November 24, however, he was elected to a seat in the French Senate, where he continued his vigorous polemic against the progressive attempts of the republican government to secularize the educational system of France until his death in 1894.
