= Hyacinthe Corne =

French politician (1802–1887)

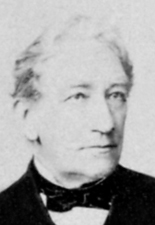
Hyacinthe Corne

Hyacinthe Marie Augustin Corne (1802-1887) was a French judge and politician. He was a senator for life from 1875 until his death in 1887.

== Biography ==
Son of François-Michel-Joseph Corne and brother-in-law of Charles Desmoutiers, he studied at the Jesuit school in Saint-Acheul, studied law in Paris, began his career in 1826 as an advisor-auditor at the court of Douai, and was appointed president of the civil court of Lille in 1830 and shortly thereafter president of the civil court of Douai. He married Adélaïde Desmoutier.

On November 4, 1837, voters in the 9th electoral college of the North (Cambrai) elected him as their representative. He took his place in the left-wing opposition and was re-elected on March 2, 1839, and July 9, 1842, but lost to Gabriel de Saint-Aignan on August 1, 1846. He took an active part in the Campagne des banquets, was appointed by the provisional government on February 25, 1848, as Attorney General in Douai, was elected on April 23, 1848, as representative of the North to the Constituent Assembly, and was called upon on June 17 of that year to serve as Attorney General at the Court of Appeal of Paris.

After Napoleon III was elected President of the Republic, he was replaced as Attorney General in Paris by Jules Baroche. On May 13, 1849, the Nord department elected him to the Legislative Assembly. Opposed to the coup 1851 French coup d'état, he was imprisoned at Mont-Valérien, then released, whereupon he temporarily renounced political life to devote himself to literary pursuits. He did not attempt to return to parliament until the elections of May 24, 1869, but he failed in the 8th constituency of the North, losing to the official candidate Seydoux.

On February 8, 1871, he was elected representative of the North to the National Assembly (1871). He sat on the Centre-left politics becoming its president, and was a member of the commission for the reorganization of the judiciary and the press commission.On December 10, 1875, the National Assembly elected him as a Senator for life (France).

He is buried in the cemetery of Douai, in the section located on the land belonging to Sin-le-Noble.

== Bibliography ==
- https://maitron.fr/spip.php?article182354
- https://www.senat.fr/senateur-3eme-republique/corne_hyacinthe1458r3.html
