= Louis Tribert =

French politician (1819–1899)

Pierre-Louis Tribert
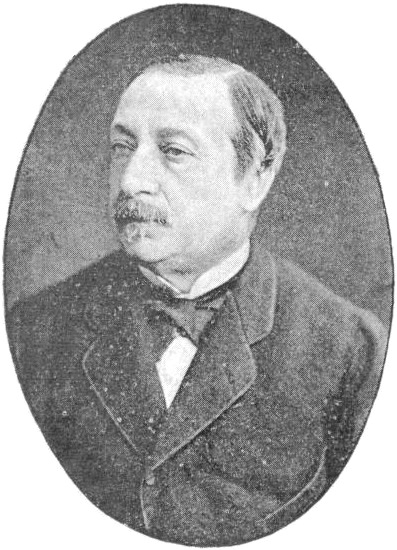
- Louis Tribert in Le Monde illustré of 24 June 1899
- Born: 23 June 1819; Paris, France
- Died: 15 June 1899 (aged 79); Saint-Denis, France
- Occupation: Politician
- Known for: Senator of the Third Republic

Pierre-Louis Tribert (23 June 1819 – 15 June 1899) was a French politician. He was one of 116 permanent senators of the French Third Republic.

== Early years ==
Pierre-Louis Tribert was born in Paris on 23 June 1819, son of Pierre Tribert, deputy for Deux-Sèvres. His mother was Catherine Lecointe-Puyraveau, the daughter of Michel Mathieu Lecointe-Puyraveau, a member of the National Convention representing Deux-Sèvres who had voted for the death of Louis XVI. He was a brilliant student at the Bourbon College, and then spent some time at the University of Berlin. He traveled in Europe, Egypt and North America. A landowner at Saint-Denis (Deux-Sèvres), he built a public school at his own expense.

== Politician ==
Tribert stood for election to the legislature on 1 June 1863 as an independent for the second riding of Deux-Sèvres, coming second with 7,382 votes against 10,772 for the official candidate M. Lasnonier, who was elected. In the elections of 24 May 1869 he stood again, and again was defeated by M. Lasnonier. When the Franco-Prussian war began, on 15 August 1870 he enlisted at the age of 52 in the 95th infantry regiment. He fought at Chevilly and at l'Hay, and was taken prisoner at Ville-Evrard on 21 December 1870. He was interned at Neisse in Silesia. In his absence, he was elected to the National Assembly on 8 February 1871.

Tribert sat in the center left, participated in several commissions. He fought a duel in 1873 with a Bonapartist journalist about and article on Lecointe-Puyraveau, his maternal grandfather. On 13 December 1875 the National Assembly elected him senator for life. Although he did not belong to any political group, Tribert often voted with the Republican left. He was against the abolition of judicial tenure, against the expulsion of the princes, in favor of the Lisbonne law restricting the freedom of the press, and in favor of the high court action against General Boulanger.

Pierre-Louis Tribert died in his property of Puyraveau in Saint-Denis, in Deux-Sèvres, on 15 June 1899 at the age of seventy nine. On 24 March 1908 Louise Tribert, 30-year-old daughter of Senator Tribert, married the journalist and traveler Félix Dubois. They were to have five children.
