= Pierre Lanfrey =

French historian and politician (1828–1877)

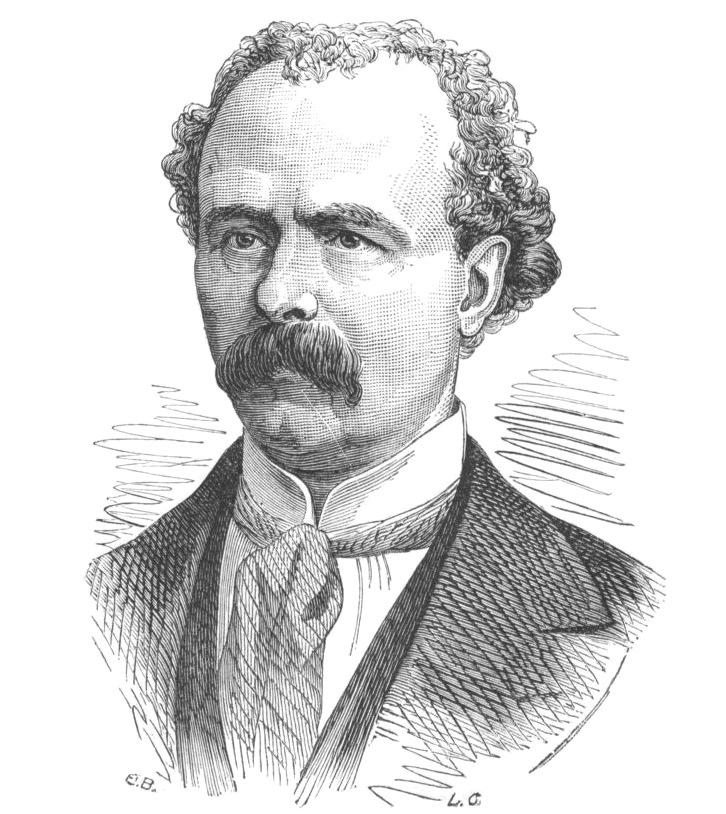
Pierre Lanfrey, In: Le Monde illustré, 24 November 1877.

Pierre Lanfrey (26 October 1828 – 15 November 1877) was a French historian and politician.

== Life ==
He was born at Chambéry (Savoie). His father had been one of Napoleon's officers. The son studied philosophy and history in Paris and wrote historical works of an anti-clerical and rationalizing tendency. These included:

- L'Église et les philosophes au dix-huitième siècle (1855; new edition, with a notice of the author by E. de Pressensé, 1879)
- Essai sur la révolution française (1858)
- Histoire politique des papes (1860)
- Lettres d'Evérard (1860), a novel in the form of letters
- Le Rétablissement de la Pologne (1863)

His magnum opus was his Histoire de Napoleon I (5 vols., 1867–1875 and 1886; Eng. trans., 4 vols, 1871–1879), which ceased at the end of 1811 with the preparations for the Russian campaign of 1812. This book, based on the emperor's correspondence published in 1858-1870, attempted the destruction of the legends which had grown up around his subject, and sought by a critical examination of the documents to explain the motives of his policy.

In his desire to refute current misconceptions and exaggerations of Napoleon's abilities, Lanfrey unduly minimized his military and administrative genius. A staunch republican, he was elected to the National Assembly in 1871, became ambassador at Bern (1871-1813), and life senator in 1875. He died at Pau on the 15 November 1877.
