= Édouard Allou =

French politician and lawyer

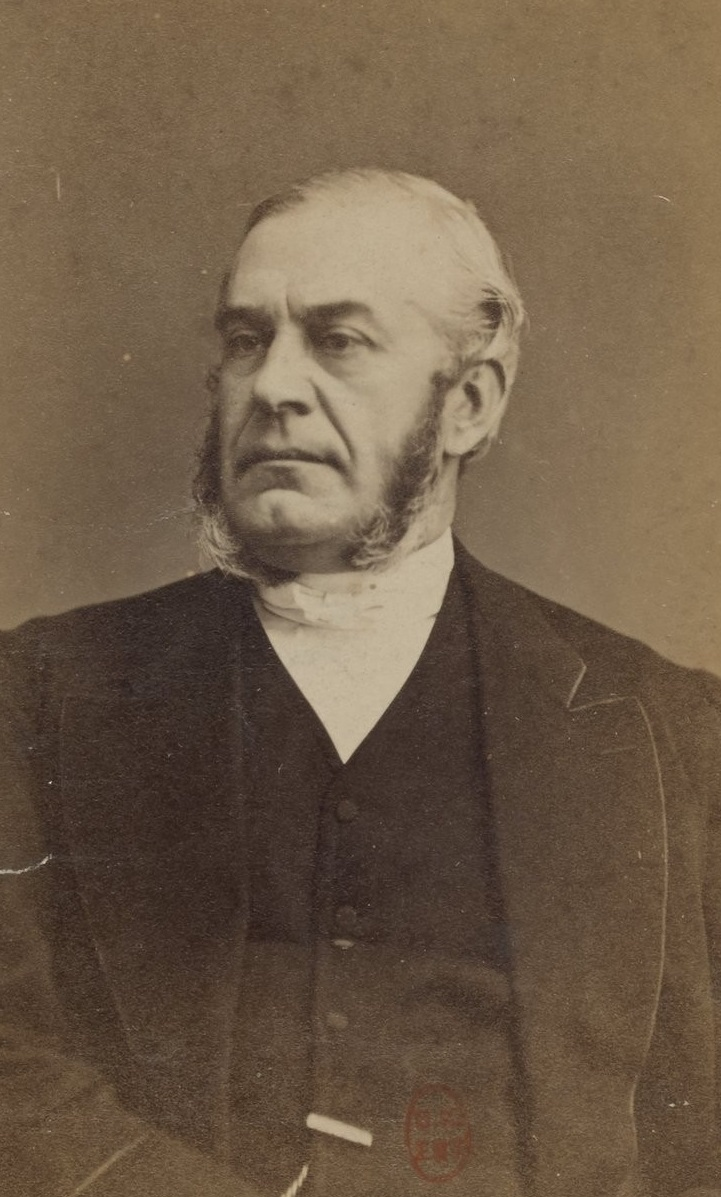
Édouard Allou

Édouard Allou (6 March 1820 – 12 July 1888) was a French lawyer and politician. He was a senator for life from 1882 until his death in 1888.

== Bibliography ==
- https://books.openedition.org/psorbonne/68117
- https://www.leonore.archives-nationales.culture.gouv.fr/ui/notice/3850
- https://www.senat.fr/senateur-3eme-republique/allou_edouard1426r3.html
