= Auguste Villemot =

French journalist (1811–1870)

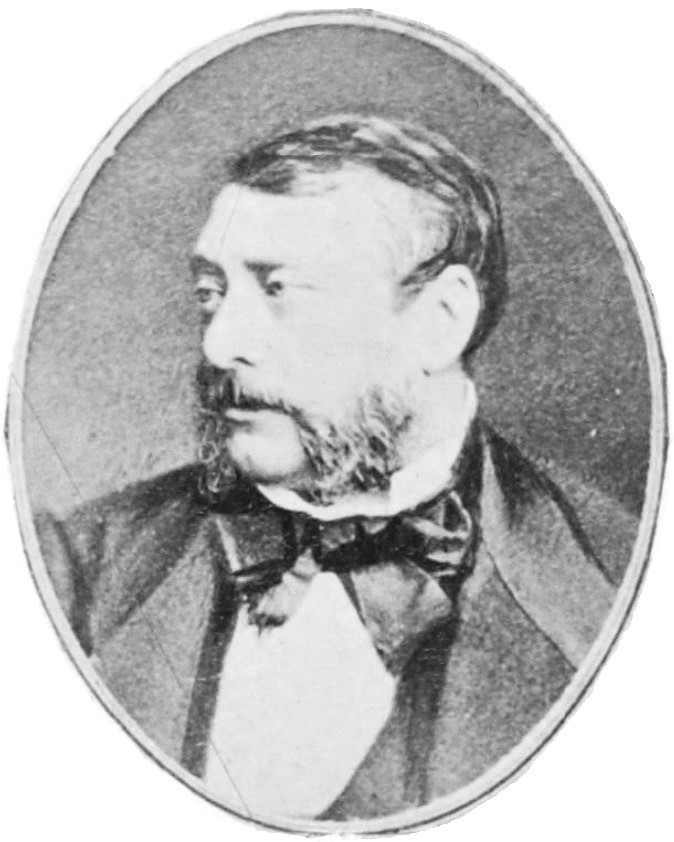
- Born: Auguste-Étienne Villemot; 1811; Versailles
- Died: 19 September 1870 (aged 58–59); Paris
- Occupation: Journalist

Auguste-Étienne Villemot (English: /vɪlˈmoʊ/ vil-MOH, French: [oɡyst etjɛn vilmo]; 1811, Versailles – 19 September 1870, Paris) was a 19th-century French journalist.

== Works ==
- La Vie à Paris, chroniques du Figaro, précédées d'une Étude sur l'esprit en France à notre époque par P.-J. Stahl, 2 volumes, Paris, Hetzel, 1858.
- (with Paul Siraudin) Le Favori de la favorite, two-act comedy for the theatre of Baden-Baden, 1860.

== Sources ==
- Georges d'Heylli, Dictionnaire des pseudonymes, Paris, Dentu, 1887, (p. 340).
- Hippolyte de Villemessant, Mémoires d'un journaliste, deuxième série (Les Hommes de mon temps), Paris, Dentu, 1872, (p. 9–58).
- Francisque Sarcey, « Villemot », Le Journal du siège de Paris, publié par Le Gaulois, Paris, 1871, (p. 18–19).
- Gustave Vapereau, Dictionnaire universel des contemporains, Paris, Hachette, 1870, (p. 1819).
