= Jules Cazot =

French politician

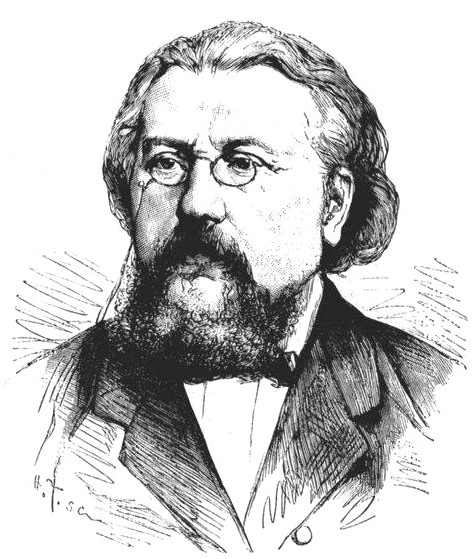

Jules-Théodore-Joseph Cazot (11 February 1821 – 27 November 1912) was a French politician of the French Third Republic. He was a member of the National Assembly of 1871. He was a senator for life from 1875 until his death. He was minister of justice in 1880 and 1881, under the governments of Jules Ferry and Léon Gambetta.

== Sources ==
- "Jules Cazot", in Adolphe Robert and Gaston Cougny, Dictionnaire des parlementaires français (1789-1891), Bourloton, Paris, 1889 Edition details Wikisource
