= La France (French newspaper) =

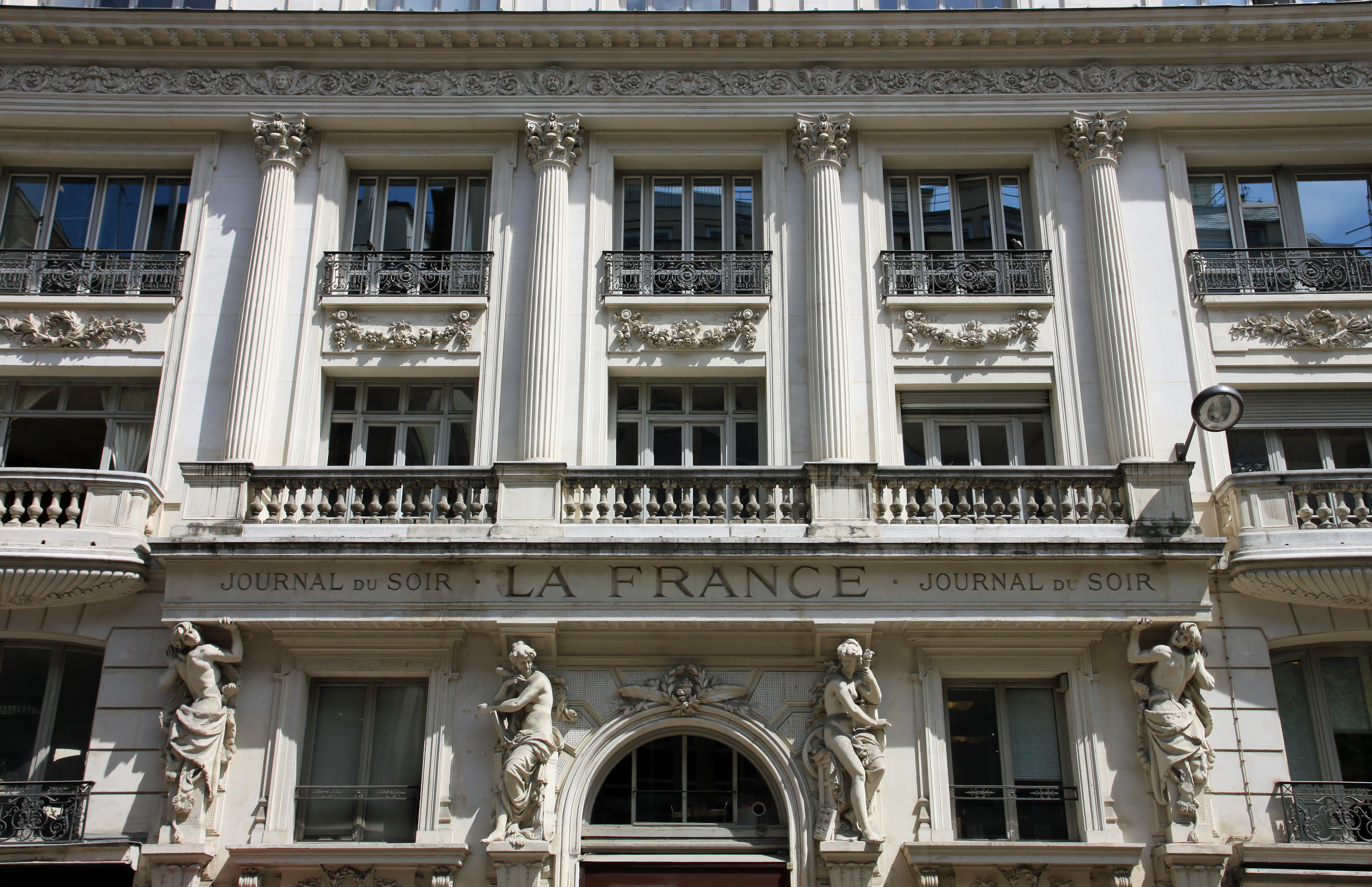
- Former headquarters of La France, in the rue Montmartre, Paris
- Type: Daily financial
- Founder: Arthur de La Guéronnière
- Founded: 1863
- Language: French
- Headquarters: Paris

La France was a daily financial newspaper in the 19th century. Founded in August 1862 by Arthur de La Guéronnière, the newspaper originally followed an editorial line that reconciled loyalty to Napoleon III with the reaffirmation of the temporal power of the Pope. It was bought in 1874 by Émile de Girardin, founder of the famous newspaper La Presse and a longtime collaborator of La Guéronnière.

More respected than La Presse and "decidedly political," according to historian Tristan Gaston Breton, in the crisis of 16 May 1877 the newspaper fought the policies of Patrice de Mac Mahon and Duke Albert de Broglie. The paper also had sections devoted to Fine Arts and Letters. Employees included Gaston de Cambronne and Émile Cère.

== History ==
The newspaper was funded by a group of senators, MPs, industrialists and landowners. The newspaper did not have any connection with the government. Its financial administration was entrusted to M. D. Pollonnais, General Council of the Alpes-Maritimes, while Count Léo de Saint-Poney, prefect of the department of Haute-Loire, held the honorary position of chief editor. Writers included M. Fiorentino as theater critic, columnist Louis Figuier on scientific subjects, Horace de Vielcastelet and Olivier de Jallin.

In 1863 commentators thought that La France would be at great pains to pretend that it had all the secrets of government policy, and that its most dangerous news was no more than indiscretions". During the period leading up to the Franco-Prussian War of 1870 the newspaper was very critical of Prussia, whom it accused of preparing for war.

The paper was directed until 1881 by Charles Lalou, a major financial adventurer, director of mines at Bruay, a boulangiste, and a deputy for the Nord Department from 1889 to 1893. A volunteer in the Franco-Prussian War of 1870, he was close to Émile de Girardin and became patron of La France until his death in 1881.

In the 1880s Félix Dubois was a correspondent for the newspaper from Berlin and Vienna. On 6 July 1895, Le Siècle's rival, La France, published a puzzle that was close to the modern Sudoku.

== Headquarters ==
The headquarters of La France moved in 1883 to a large building at 142 rue Montmartre in Paris, designed by the architect Ferdinand Bal. Sculpted by Ernest-Eugène Hiolle and Louis Lefèvre, two Atlanteans wearing lion skins and two caryatids symbolizing journalism and typography, to the left and right of the entrance arcade, supported the sign of newspaper underneath the first floor balcony. The building later became the headquarters of L'Aurore. The ground floor is (as at 2024) occupied by a Carrefour supermarket.
