= Lucien Brun =

French politician (1822–1898)

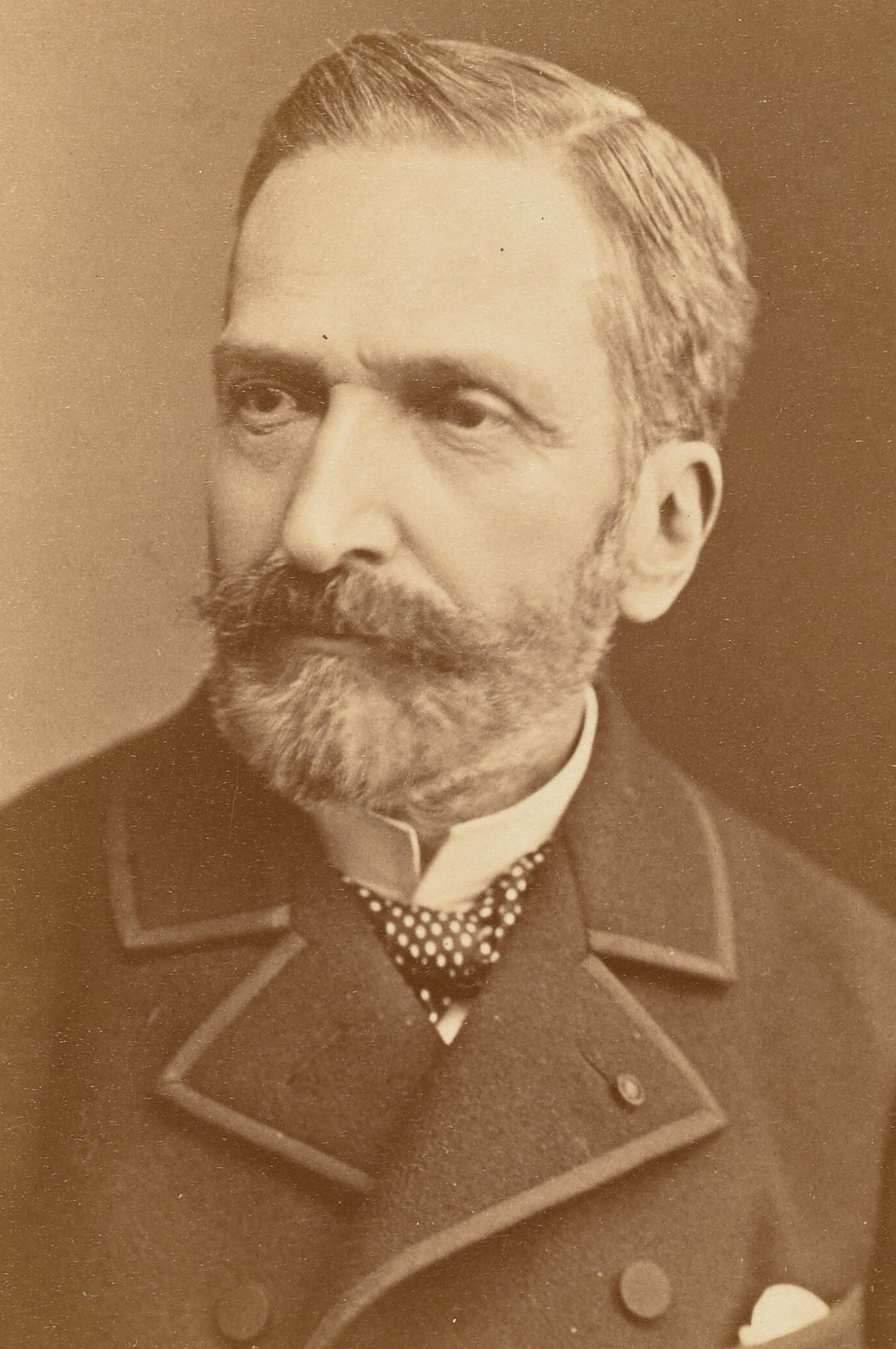
Brun, c. 1871 – 1881

Lucien Henri Louis Brun (2 June 1822 – 28 November 1898) was a French politician.

Brun was born in Gex, Ain, on 2 June 1822. After graduating from the Faculty of Law of Paris, Brun practiced law in Lyon until his 1871 election to the National Assembly as a deputy from Ain. Brun won over 40,000 votes and was the sixth of seven Ain-based deputies to be seated. He served until 1876. The next year, Brun was elected to the Senate and designated a senator for life. He died on 28 November 1898, and was replaced by Athanase Bassinet.
