= Armand Félix Marie Jobbé-Duval =

French painter and politician (1821–1889)

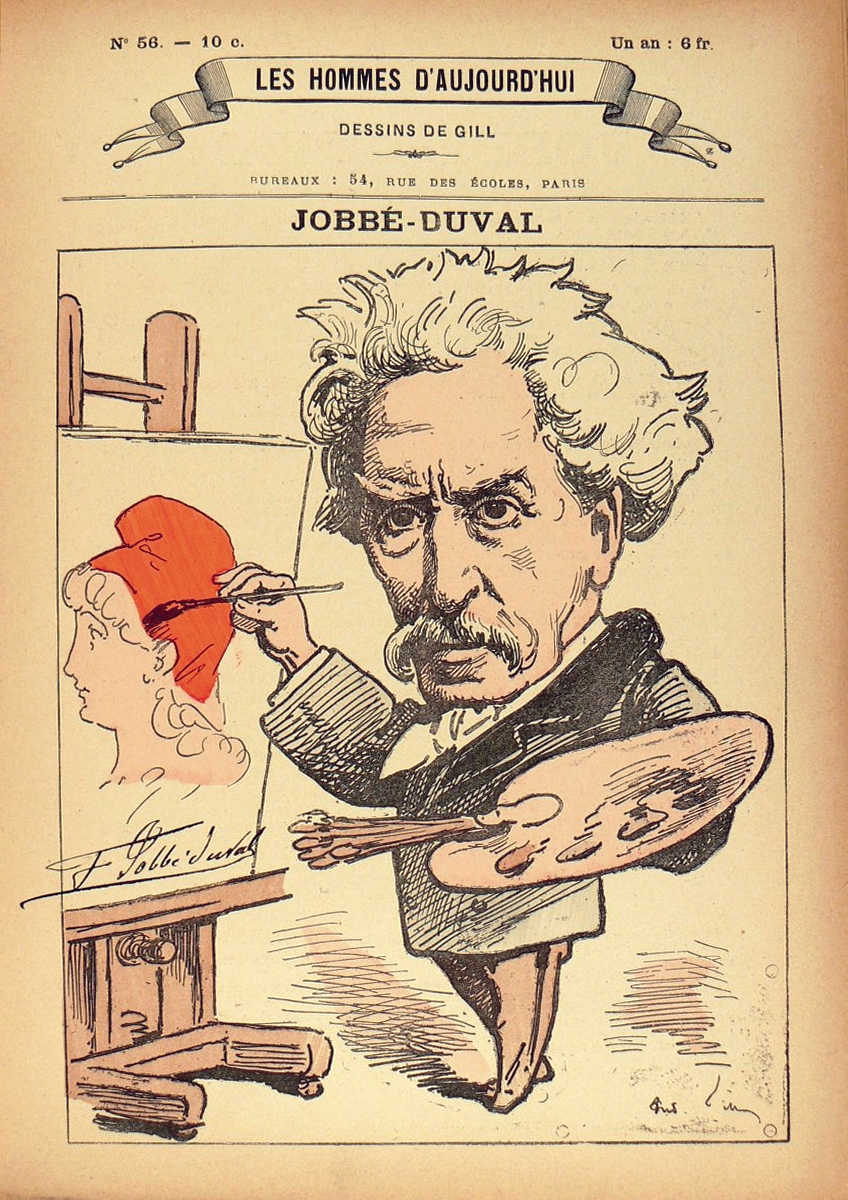
- Jobbé-Duval by André Gill, c. 1880
- Born: 17 July 1821; Carhaix, Finistère, France
- Died: 2 April 1899 (aged 77); Paris, France
- Occupations: Painter, politician

Armand Félix Marie Jobbé-Duval (17 July 1821 – 2 April 1889) was a French painter and politician of Breton origin. He became known for his severely classical compositions, which included the ceiling decorations of many churches and public buildings. He was a committed Republican and secularist, and participated in the French revolutions of 1848 and 1870–71.

== Family ==
Armand Félix Marie Jobbé-Duval was born on 17 July 1821 in Carhaix, where his father Thomas Félix Jobbé-Duval (1787–1860), was an engineer and chief surveyor for the cadastre (land registry) of Finistère, Brittany. He was the youngest of four children of Thomas Félix Jobbé-Duval and Charlotte Le Tournoux de Villegeorges (1791-1828), both from Rennes, who had married on 28 November 1811. He married Marie Louise Sophie Jacquemart (1831–1917) in the Église Saint-Laurent, Paris, and they had four children between 1850 and 1865.

== Artistic career ==
Jobbé-Duval studied at the Tour d’Auvergne college in Quimper, where he showed artistic qualities and talents in sketching. He obtained a grant from the General Council of Finistère to attend the School of Fine Arts in Paris, which he entered on 1 April 1840. His first teacher was the painter Paul Delaroche (1797–1856), then in 1843 he joined the studio of Charles Gleyre (1806–1874). He was allowed to compete for the Prix de Rome five times between 1842 and 1847, and developed a rigorous style to meet academic requirements.

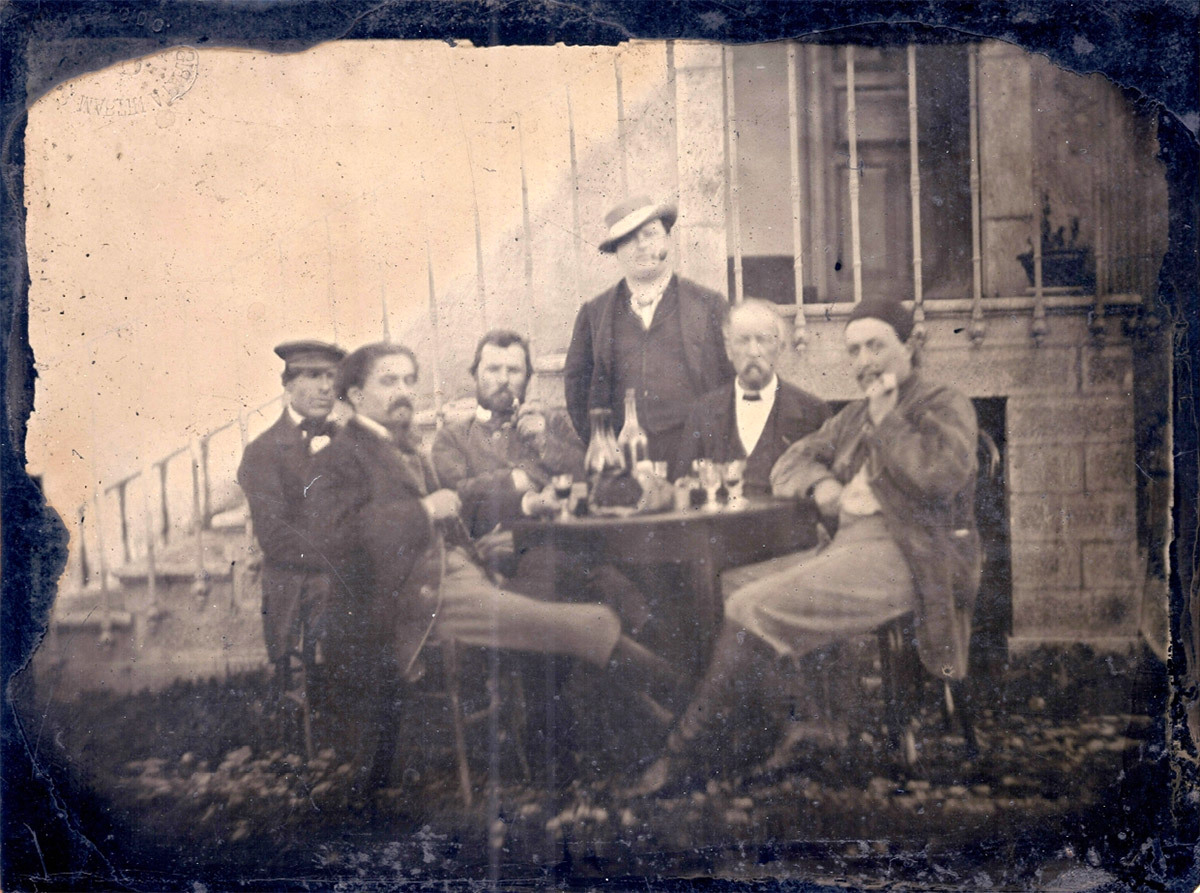
Van Gogh (uncertain, 3rd from left) with Gauguin, Émile Bernard, Félix Jobbé-Duval and André Antoine (c. 1887)

Jobbé-Duval joined the Salon des Artistes Français and was part of the salon's jury from 1861. He was acquainted with many artists, including the landscape artists Jean-François Millet (1814–1875) and Charles-François Daubigny (1817–1878). With Paul Gauguin (1848–1903) he discovered the famous Pension Gloanec in Pont-Aven. His religious and historical paintings contain many references to the moral and political issues being discussed during the Second French Empire and French Third Republic.

Jobbé-Duval established his reputation with a series of monumental decorative paintings in the churches of Saint-Séverin and Saint-Sulpice in Paris, working at the same time as Eugène Delacroix (1798–1863). During his career he received many commissions from the Church and the state. He decorated other churches of Paris such as La Trinité and St-Gervais-et-St-Protais, as well as public buildings such as the Commercial Court of Paris and Lyon City Hall.

In 1867 he was invited to decorate the ceiling of the Third Chamber of Correctional Appeals in the southwestern pavilion of the Parlement of Rennes in Rennes. His composition represented Truth, in the form of a strongly-built nude woman, surrounded by Justice, Innocence and Law. At their feet are Crimes, with dark and muscular bodies. The composition shows the influence of Jean Jouvenet, Ingres, Michelangelo and this master Paul Delaroche.

== Political activity ==
Jobbé-Duval was a militant Republican. He participated in demonstrations during February Revolution in which the July Monarchy was overthrown, and was part of the Government of National Defense during the Paris Commune in 1871. He was elected to the municipal council of the 15th arrondissement of Paris on 30 July 1871, and was reelected on 29 November 1874, 6 January 1878, 16 January 1881 and 4 May 1884. He resigned on 29 April 1887. He was a Freemason, Fourierist and committed secularist. He initiated establishing an institution for incurable young children, and municipal lay orphanages.

Jobbé-Duval died in Paris on 2 April 1889. A street in the 15th arrondissement is named in his honor. His nephew, Félix Jobbé-Duval (1879–1961), became well-known as an illustrator for children's books and magazines. In 2017 the Rennes Museum of Fine Arts acquired a collection of over 250 drawings by Jobbé-Duval. These include studies of the figures and drapery used in most of the artist's major public decorations.

== Sources ==
- Dorsch, Michael (5 July 2017), "French Sculpture Following the Franco-Prussian War, 1870?0 ": Realist Allegories and the Commemoration of Defeat, Taylor & Francis, ISBN 978-1-351-56640-7
- Félix Armand Marie Jobbé-Duval (1821-1889 (in French), Bibliothèques spécialisées de la Ville de Paris
- Kazerouni, Guillaume (17 January 2018), "Armand-Felix Jobbé-Duval (1821-1889)", La Tribune de l'Art (in French)
- le coq de noyac : Jobbé-Duval, Félix (1879-1961) (in French), Cité internationale de la bande dessinée et de l’image
- Lemaître, Capucine (September–October 2014), "Les Jobbé-Duval : Une famille d'artistes sur cinq générations" (PDF), Place Publique (in French), Rennes
- Goetgheluck, Patrick, "Armand Marie Félix JOBBE DUVAL", Geneanet (in French)
