= Oscar Fay Adams =

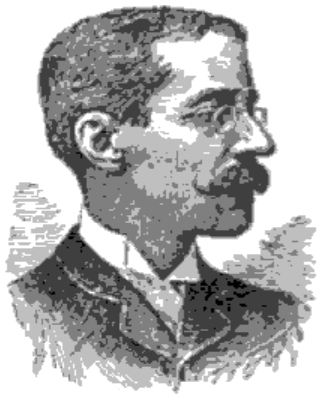
- Born: 1855; Worcester, Massachusetts, U.S.
- Died: April 30, 1919 (aged 63–64); North Truro, Massachusetts, U.S.
- Education: New Jersey State Normal School
- Occupations: Editor, author

Oscar Fay Adams (1855–1919) was an American editor and author.

== Biography ==
Adams was born in Worcester, Massachusetts, where he was educated in secondary schools, and graduated from the New Jersey State Normal School. He taught classes in English literature, and after 1880 wrote for periodicals.

He died in North Truro, Massachusetts, on April 30, 1919, aged 63 or 64.

== Works ==
Adams wrote The Story of Jane Austen's Life (1891; second edition, 1896), The Archbishop's Unguarded Moment, and Other Stories (1899) and Dictionary of American Authors (revised edition, 1901). He edited Through the Year with the Poets (12 volumes, 1886).
