= Edmond Schérer =

French theologian, critic and politician

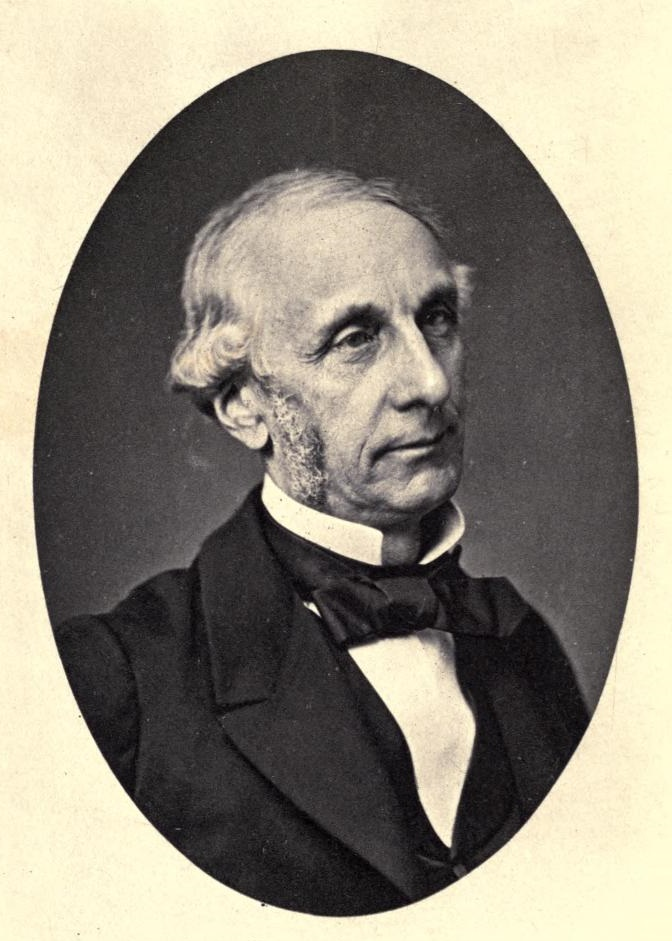
Edmond Schérer.

Edmond Henri Adolphe Schérer (April 8, 1815 – March 16, 1889) was a French theologian, critic and politician.

== Biography ==
He was born in Paris. After a course of legal studies, he spent several years in theological study at Strasbourg, where he graduated in theology in 1843, and was ordained. In 1843, he was appointed professor of exegesis in the École Évangélique at Geneva (popularly known as L'Oratoire). The development of his opinions in favour of the Liberal movement in Protestant theology led to his resigning the post six years later. He founded the Anti-Jesuite, afterwards the Réformation au XIXe siècle, in which he advocated the separation of the Church from the State; but he gradually abandoned Protestant doctrine.

In thought he became a pronounced Hegelian. Eventually he settled in Paris, where he at once attracted attention by brilliant literary criticisms, at first chiefly on great foreign writers, contributed to the Revue des deux mondes. He was elected municipal councillor at Versailles in 1870, deputy to the National Assembly for the department Seine-et-Oise in 1871 and senator for life in 1875. He supported the Republican party.

Towards the end of his life, he devoted self mainly to literary and general criticism, and was for many years one of the ablest contributors to Le Temps. He was a frequent visitor to England, and took a lively interest in English politics and literature. He died at Versailles.

== Works ==
- Dogmatique de l'Église réformée (1843)
- De l'état actuel de l'Église réformée en France (1844)
- Esquisse d'une analyse de l'église chrétienne (1845)
- La Critique et la foi (1850)
- Alexandre Vinet, sa vie et ses écrits (1853)
- Lettres à mon curé (1853)
- M. Proudhon, ou la banqueroute du Socialisme (1858)
- Études critiques sur la littérature contemporaine (1863-1889)
- Études critiques de littérature (1876)
- Diderot (1880)
- La Démocratie et la France (1883)
- Études sur la littérature au XVIIIe siècle (1891).

He also wrote a biography of Melchior Grimm (1887).

=== Articles ===
- "The French Republic and the Catholic Church," The Contemporary Review, Vol. XXXVII, June 1880.
