= Francisque Sarcey =

French journalist and drama critic (1827–1899)

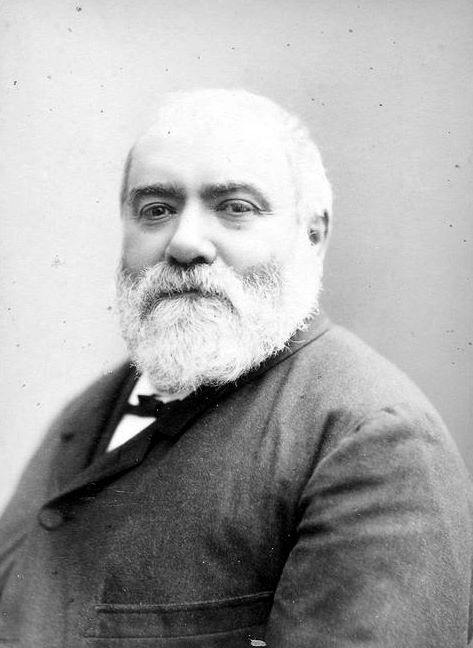
Francisque Sarcey

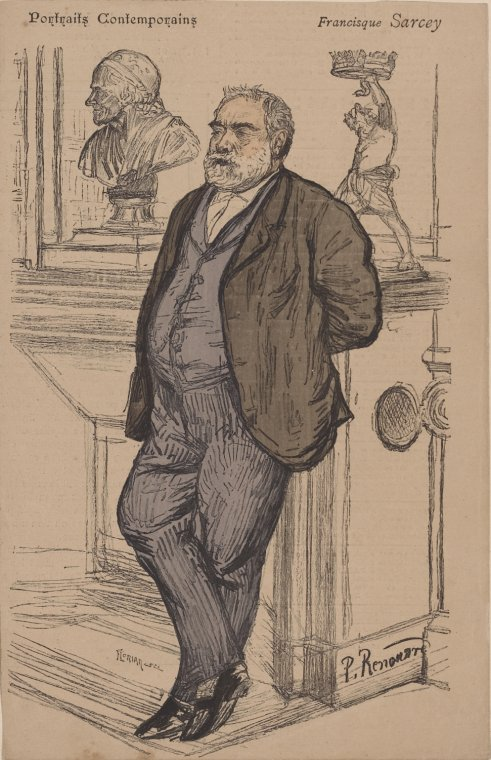
A sketch of Sarcey made in 1886

Francisque Sarcey (8 October 1827 – 16 May 1899) was a French journalist and dramatic critic.

== Career ==
Sarcey was born in Dourdan, Essonne. After some years as schoolmaster, a job for which his temperament was ill-fitted, he entered journalism in 1858. He contributed to Le Figaro, L'Illustration, Le Gaulois, Le XIX^{e} Siècle and other periodicals; but his main interest was dramatic criticism, of which he had his first experience in L'Opinion nationale in 1859. In 1867 he began to contribute to Le Temps the "feuilleton" with which his name was associated till his death. His position as dictator of dramatic criticism was said to be unique. He had the secret of taking the public into his confidence, and his pronouncements upon new plays were accepted as final.

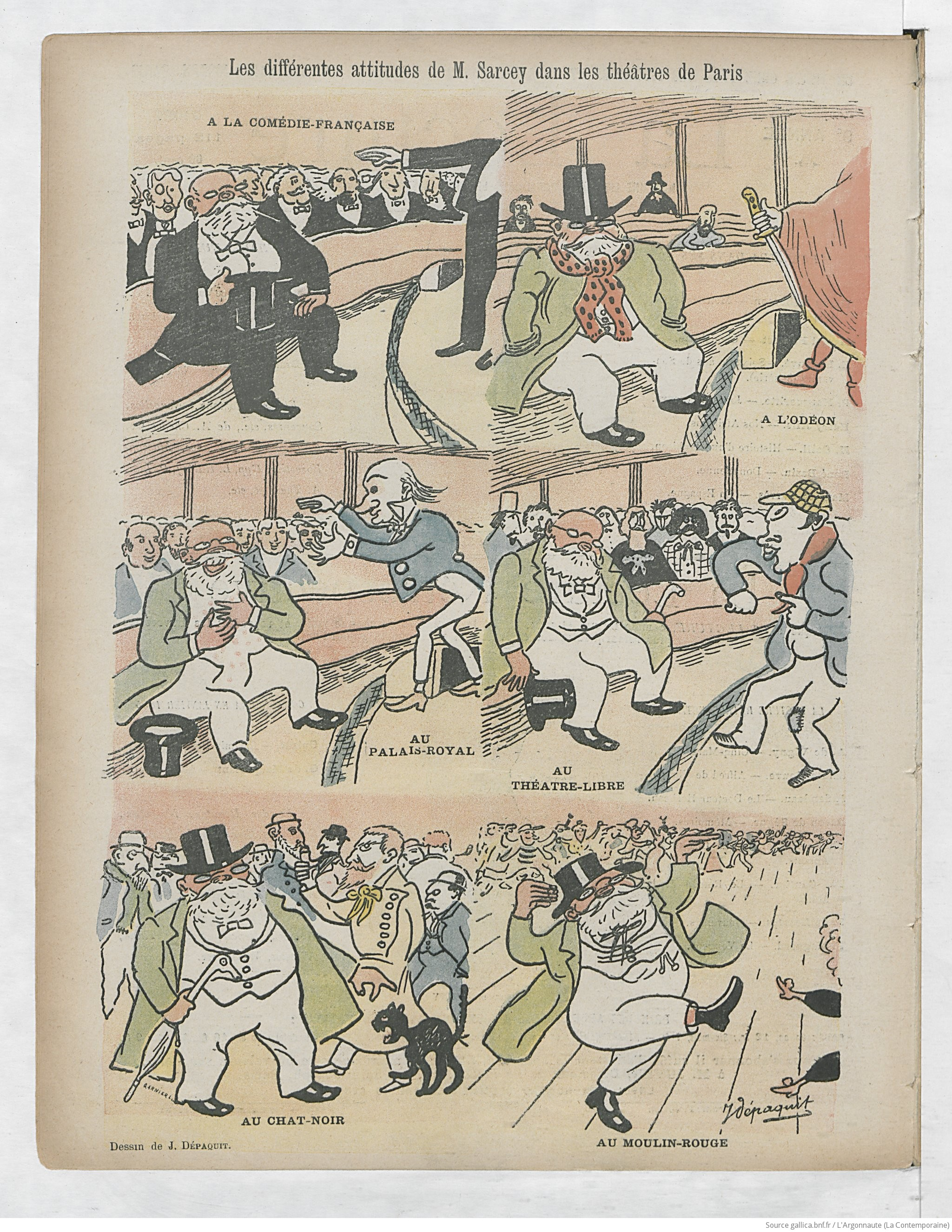

According to the Encyclopædia Britannica Eleventh Edition, he was a masterly judge of acting and of stage effect; his views as to the drama itself were narrow and indifferent to artistic progress. For example, in 1896, he reviewed the premiere of Alfred Jarry's play Ubu Roi—a precursor of the Theatre of the Absurd—and called it "a filthy fraud which deserves nothing but the silence of contempt." Such opinions made him a subject of ridicule among the rebellious young artists and writers of Montmartre. Between 1886 and 1893, the writer and humorist Alphonse Allais published a notorious series of newspaper columns under Sarcey's name with titles such as "How I Became an Idiot."

Sarcey published several miscellaneous works, of which the most interesting are Le Siège de Paris, an account compiled from his diary (1871), Comédiens et comédiennes (1878-1884), Souvenirs de jeunesse (1884) and Souvenirs d'âge mûr (1892; Eng. trans., 1893). Quarante ans de théâtre (1900) is a selection (in 8 volumes) from his dramatic Feuilletons edited by Adolphe Brisson. He died in Paris.

== Vegetarianism ==
Sarcey gave up eating meat in 1893 and described himself as a "moderate vegetarian" (what would now be described as pescatarian). He abstained from meat but ate butter, cheese, eggs, milk and fish. He argued that the diet gave him great resistance to fatigue and improved his health.

== Publications in English translation ==
- How I Became an Idiot by Francisque Sarcey (Alphonse Allais) Translated by Doug Skinner (Black Scat Books: Absurdist Texts & Documents - Interim Edition No. 00, 2013)
- I Am Sarcey by Alphonse Allais Translated by Doug Skinner (Black Scat Books: 2017)
