= List of elections in 1871 =

The following elections occurred in the year 1871.

- 1871 Chilean presidential election
- 1871–72 Colombian presidential election
- 1871 Costa Rican Constituent Assembly election
- 1871 Mexican general election
- 1871 New Zealand general election

== Africa ==
- French legislative election in Algeria
- general election in Liberia
- French legislative election in Senegal

== Europe ==
- 1871 Dutch general election
- 1871 Faroese general election
- July 1871 French by-elections
- February 1871 French legislative election and July 1871 French by-elections
- 1871 German federal election
- 1871 Portuguese legislative election
- 1871 Serbian parliamentary election
- 1871 Spanish general election

=== United Kingdom ===
- United Kingdom:
  - 1871 Dover by-election
  - January and April 1871 Durham City by-election
  - 1871 East Surrey by-election
  - 1871 Galway County by-election
  - 1871 Halifax by-election
  - 1871 Hereford by-election
  - 1871 Limerick City by-election
  - 1871 County Limerick by-election
  - 1871 County Meath by-election
  - 1871 County Monaghan by-election
  - 1871 Monmouthshire by-election
  - 1871 Newry by-election
  - 1871 Norwich by-election
  - 1871 Plymouth by-election
  - 1871 Ripon by-election
  - 1871 South Norfolk by-election
  - 1871 Stalybridge by-election
  - 1871 Tamworth by-election
  - 1871 Truro by-election
  - 1871 West Norfolk by-election
  - 1871 West Staffordshire by-election
  - 1871 County Westmeath by-election
  - 1871 Westmorland by-election
  - 1871 York by-election

== North America ==
=== Canada ===
- 1871 British Columbia general election
- 1871 Nova Scotia general election
- 1871 Ontario general election
- 1871 Quebec general election
- By-elections to the 1st Canadian Parliament

=== United States ===
- California:
  - 1871 United States Senate election in California
  - 1871 United States House of Representatives elections in California
  - 1871 California gubernatorial election
- Connecticut:
  - 1871 United States House of Representatives elections in Connecticut
  - 1871 Connecticut gubernatorial election
- Georgia:
  - 1871 Georgia gubernatorial special election
  - 1871 United States Senate special elections in Georgia
- Illinois:
  - 1871 Chicago mayoral election
  - 1871 Illinois's at-large congressional district special election
- Iowa: 1871 Iowa gubernatorial election
- Kansas: 1871 United States Senate election in Kansas
- Kentucky:
  - 1871 United States Senate election in Kentucky
  - 1871 Kentucky gubernatorial election
- Maine: 1871 Maine gubernatorial election
- Maryland: 1871 Maryland gubernatorial election
- Massachusetts:
  - 1871 United States Senate election in Massachusetts
  - 1871 Massachusetts gubernatorial election
- Michigan: 1871 United States Senate election in Michigan
- Minnesota:
  - 1871 United States Senate election in Minnesota
  - 1871 United States Senate special election in Minnesota
  - 1871 Minnesota gubernatorial election
- New Hampshire:
  - 1871 United States House of Representatives elections in New Hampshire
  - 1871 New Hampshire gubernatorial election
- New Jersey: 1871 New Jersey gubernatorial election
- New York: 1871 New York state election
- Ohio: 1871 Ohio gubernatorial election
- Rhode Island: 1871 Rhode Island gubernatorial election
- Texas:
  - 1871 United States House of Representatives elections in Texas
  - 1871 United States Senate election in Texas
- Virginia: 1871 United States Senate election in Virginia
- West Virginia: 1871 United States Senate election in West Virginia
- Wisconsin: 1871 Wisconsin gubernatorial election

== See also ==
- Category:1871 elections
