= List of elections in 1869 =

The following elections occurred in the year 1869.

== North America ==
=== Canada ===
- 1869 Newfoundland general election

=== Central America ===
- 1869 Honduran presidential election
- 1869 Costa Rican general election
- 1869 Salvadoran presidential election

=== United States ===
- 1869 New York state election

==== United States Senate ====
- 1868 and 1869 United States Senate elections
- 1869 United States Senate election in Massachusetts
- 1869 United States Senate election in New York
- 1869 United States Senate election in Pennsylvania
- 1869 United States Senate election in Wisconsin

==== United States House of Representatives ====
- 1868–69 United States House of Representatives elections

==== United States lieutenant gubernatorial ====
- 1869 Connecticut lieutenant gubernatorial election
- 1869 Minnesota lieutenant gubernatorial election
- 1869 Texas lieutenant gubernatorial election

==== United States gubernatorial ====
- 1869 Connecticut gubernatorial election
- 1869 Iowa gubernatorial election
- 1869 Maine gubernatorial election
- 1869 Massachusetts gubernatorial election
- 1869 Minnesota gubernatorial election
- 1869 Mississippi gubernatorial election
- 1869 New Hampshire gubernatorial election
- 1869 Ohio gubernatorial election
- 1869 Pennsylvania gubernatorial election
- 1869 Rhode Island gubernatorial election
- 1869 Texas gubernatorial election
- 1869 Vermont gubernatorial election
- 1869 Virginia gubernatorial election
- 1869 Wisconsin gubernatorial election

==== United States mayoral ====
- 1869 Boston mayoral election
- 1869 Chicago mayoral election
- 1869 Manchester, New Hampshire, mayoral election
- 1869 Worcester, Massachusetts, mayoral election

== Europe ==
- 1869 Danish Folketing election
- 1869 Faroese general election
- 1869 Greek parliamentary election
- 1869 Hungarian parliamentary election
- 1869 Liechtenstein general election
- 1869 Luxembourg general election
- 1869 Portuguese legislative election
- 1869 Serbian parliamentary election
- 1869 Spanish general election
- 1869 Swedish general election
- 1869 Swiss federal election

=== United Kingdom ===
- 1869 Blackburn by-election

=== France ===
- 1869 French legislative election

== Africa ==
- 1869 Liberian general election

== See also ==
- Category:1869 elections
