= 2022 Augusta, Georgia mayoral election =

- May 24, 2022; June 21, 2022

Candidate	Garnett Johnson	Steve Kendrick
First round	13,853; 38.80%	14,061; 39.38%
Runoff	13,258; 53.41%	11,564; 46.59%
Mayor before election
Hardie Davis
Nonpartisan
Elected Mayor
Garnett Johnson
Nonpartisan

The 2022 Augusta, Georgia mayoral election took place on June 21, 2022, following a primary election on May 24, 2022. Incumbent Mayor Hardie Davis was term-limited and could not run for re-election. A crowded field emerged to succeed him, with nine separate candidates running. In the primary election, former County Tax Commissioner Steven Kendrick narrowly placed first, winning 39.4 percent of the vote to businessman Garnett Johnson's 38.8 percent. Because no candidate received a majority of the vote, Kendrick and Johnson advanced to the runoff election. In a low-turnout election, Johnson narrowly defeated Kendrick, winning 53–47 percent.

== Primary election ==
=== Candidates ===
- Steven Kendrick, former Richmond County Tax Commissioner
- Garnett Johnson, businessman
- Marion Williams, former Augusta-Richmond County Commissioner
- Lori Myles, retired educator
- Donald Bradshaw, securities broker
- A. K. Hasan, member of the Richmond County Board of Education
- Charlie Hannah, President of the Richmond County Board of Education
- Lucas V. Johnson, customer service representative
- Robert Ingham, accountant

=== Results ===
Primary election results
Party	Candidate	Votes	%
Nonpartisan	Steven Kendrick	14,061	39.38%
Nonpartisan	Garnett Johnson	13,853	38.80%
Nonpartisan	Marion Williams	3,180	8.91%
Nonpartisan	Lori Myles	1,262	3.53%
Nonpartisan	Donald Bradshaw	988	2.77%
Nonpartisan	A. K. Hasan	854	2.39%
Nonpartisan	Charlie Hannah	707	1.98%
Nonpartisan	Lucas V. Johnson	453	1.27%
Nonpartisan	Robert Ingham	344	0.96%
Total votes		35,702	100.00%

== Runoff election ==
=== Results ===
2022 Augusta, Georgia mayoral election
Party	Candidate	Votes	%
Nonpartisan	Garnett Johnson	13,258	53.41%
Nonpartisan	Steven Kendrick	11,564	46.59%
Total votes		24,822	100.00%
