= 2002 United States elections =

- ← 2000 2001 2002 2003 2004 → Midterm elections
- Election day: November 5
- Incumbent president: ▌George W. Bush (R)
- Next Congress: 108th

Senate elections
- Overall control: Republican gain
- Seats contested: 34 of 100 seats (33 seats of Class II +1 special election)
- Net seat change: Republican +2
- 2002 Senate election results map

House elections
- Overall control: Republican hold
- Seats contested: All 435 voting seats
- Popular vote margin: Republican +4.8%
- Net seat change: Republican +8
- 2002 House of Representatives results (territorial delegate races not shown)

Gubernatorial elections
- Seats contested: 38 (36 states, 2 territories)
- Net seat change: Democratic +3
- 2002 gubernatorial election results

Legend
- Republican hold Republican gain Democratic hold Democratic gain Independent hold

Elections were held in the United States on November 5, 2002, in the middle of Republican President George W. Bush's first term. Republicans won unified control of Congress, picking up seats in both chambers of Congress, making Bush the first president since Franklin D. Roosevelt in 1934 to gain seats in both houses of Congress. In the gubernatorial elections, Democrats won a net gain of 3 seats. The elections were held just a little under fourteen months after the September 11 attacks. Thus, the elections were heavily overshadowed by the war on terror.

Republicans won a net gain of two seats in the Senate and so gained control of a chamber that they had lost in 2001 after Senator Jim Jeffords left the Republican Party. Republicans also picked up eight seats in the House of Representatives, thereby making this election cycle one of three midterm elections in which the incumbent president's party did not experience a net loss of seats in either chamber of Congress, the other two being 1934 and 1998. This is also the only election cycle in history where the incumbent president's party gained a chamber of Congress in a midterm election. Additionally, it was the most recent midterm in which the incumbent president's party did not lose control of at least one chamber and maintained a trifecta on the federal government.

== Federal elections ==
Despite being the incumbent party in the White House, which is usually a disadvantage for the president's party during midterm congressional elections, Republicans achieved gains in both chambers of the United States Congress.

=== United States Senate elections ===
During the 2002 U.S. Senate elections, all thirty-three regularly scheduled Class II Senate seats as well as a special election in Missouri were held.

In the end, the Republican Party achieved an overall net gain of two seats with victories in Georgia, Minnesota, and Missouri, while the Democrats took a seat in Arkansas. Thus, the balance of power in the Senate changed from a 51–49 Democratic majority to a 51–49 Republican majority.

=== United States House of Representatives elections ===
During the 2002 House elections, all 435 seats in the House of Representatives plus 5 of the 6 nonvoting delegates from territories and the District of Columbia were up for election that year. These elections were the first to be held following redistricting in apportionment according to the 2000 United States census.

Republicans succeeded in expanding their majority in the House of Representatives by a net gain of eight, resulting in a 229–204 Republican majority. They won the nationwide popular vote by a margin of 4.8 points. This represented just the third time since the American Civil War that the president's party picked up seats in the House of Representatives, following the 1934 and 1998 elections.

In addition to all regularly scheduled House elections, there were two special elections held, one for Oklahoma's 1st congressional district on January 8 and another for Hawaii's 2nd congressional district on November 30.

== State elections ==
=== Gubernatorial elections ===
During the 2002 gubernatorial elections, the governorships of the 36 states, 2 territories, and the District of Columbia were up for election.

Going into the elections, Republicans held the governorships of 27 states and one territory (that being the Northern Mariana Islands); Democrats held those of twenty-one states, four territories, and the mayorship of the District of Columbia; and two governorships were held by incumbents of neither party (those being Angus King (I-Me.) and Jesse Ventura (IPM-Minn.)). Following the elections, Republicans sustained a net loss of one state governorship (but did gain the governorship of the territory of Guam); Democrats had an overall net gain of three state governorships and held on to all other territorial governorships and the mayorship of the District of Columbia; and there would be no governorships held by independents or third parties. Thus, the balance of power (excluding nonstate entities) would change from a 27–21 Republican majority to a 26–24 Republican majority.

=== Other statewide elections ===
In some states where the positions were elective offices, voters elected candidates for state executive-branch offices (lieutenant governor (though some were elected on the same ticket as the gubernatorial nominee); secretary of state; state treasurer; state auditor; state attorney general; state superintendent of education; commissioner of insurance, agriculture, or labor; etc.) and state judicial-branch offices (seats on state supreme courts and, in some states, state appellate courts).

=== State legislative elections ===
In 2002, the seats of the legislatures of forty-six states and five nonstate entities were up for election. Republicans flipped control of six chambers: the Colorado Senate, the Georgia Senate for the first time since 1870, the Missouri House of Representatives for the first time since 1955, the Texas House of Representatives for the first time since 1873, the Washington Senate, and the Wisconsin Senate. Meanwhile, Democrats flipped control of the Illinois Senate. Additionally, the Arizona Senate went from a Democratic-led coalition to Republican control. The Maine Senate went from an evenly divided power-sharing government to a Democratic one. while the Oregon Senate went from Republican to tied.

Republicans had initially won control of the North Carolina House of Representatives by one seat, but Republican Michael P. Decker switched parties to become a Democrat, producing a tied chamber.

As a result, Republicans held a majority of state legislative seats for the first time in half a century.

== Local elections ==
Nationwide, there were some cities, counties, school boards, special districts and others that elected members in 2002.

A total of 37 transportation measures, levies, and issues were on the November 2002 ballot.

=== Mayoral elections ===
Various major American cities held their mayoral elections in 2002, including the following:

- Augusta, Georgia – incumbent mayor Bob Young (R) won reelection against former mayor Ed McIntyre.
- Dover, Delaware – incumbent mayor James L. Hutchison (R) was reelected without opposition.
- Independence, Missouri – incumbent mayor Ron Stewart (D) was reelected.
- Lexington, Kentucky – former councilwoman Teresa Isaac (D) defeated attorney Scott Crosbie in an open-seat election to succeed outgoing mayor Pam Miller (D).
- Louisville – former Louisville mayor Jerry Abramson (D) was elected mayor of the newly created consolidated city-county of Louisville-Jefferson County (created as the result of the merger of the Louisville City and Jefferson County governments).
- New Orleans – Ray Nagin (D), vice president and regional general manager of Cox Communications, won an open-seat election to succeed outgoing mayor Marc Morial (D).
- Providence, Rhode Island – state representative David Cicilline (D) won an open-seat election to succeed acting mayor John J. Lombardi. Cicilline thus became the first openly gay mayor of a state capital city, and Providence would remain the largest American city to have an openly gay mayor until Sam Adams's inauguration as mayor of Portland, Oregon, on January 1, 2009.
- Salem, Oregon – Janet Taylor was elected mayor of Salem to succeed outgoing mayor Mike Swaim.
- Washington, D.C. – incumbent mayor Anthony A. Williams (D) was reelected to a second term, defeating councilwoman Carol Schwartz (R).
