= 1870 United States elections =

- ← 1868 1869 1870 1871 1872 → Midterm elections
- Election day: November 8
- Incumbent president: ▌Ulysses S. Grant (R)
- Next Congress: 42nd

Senate elections
- Overall control: Republican hold
- Seats contested: 25 of 70 seats
- Net seat change: Democratic +3
- Results: Democratic gain Democratic hold Republican hold Legislature failed to elect

House elections
- Overall control: Republican hold
- Seats contested: All 243 voting seats
- Net seat change: Democratic +33
- Results: Democratic hold Democratic gain Republican hold Republican gain Conservative gain

Elections occurred in the middle of the Republican President Ulysses S. Grant's first term, during the Third Party System. Members of the 42nd United States Congress were chosen in this election. The election took place during the Reconstruction Era, and many Southerners were disfranchised. It was also the first election after the passage of the 15th Amendment, which prohibits state and federal governments from denying the right to vote on the basis of race, color, or previous condition of servitude, although disenfranchisement would persist. The Republican Party maintained a majority in both houses of Congress, although the Democrats picked up several seats in both chambers.

In the House, Democrats won major gains, but Republicans retained a solid majority.

In the Senate, Democrats won moderate gains, but Republicans retained a commanding majority.

== See also ==
- 1870–71 United States House of Representatives elections
- 1870–71 United States Senate elections
