= 1871 Georgia gubernatorial special election =

1871 Georgia gubernatorial election
- December 19, 1871
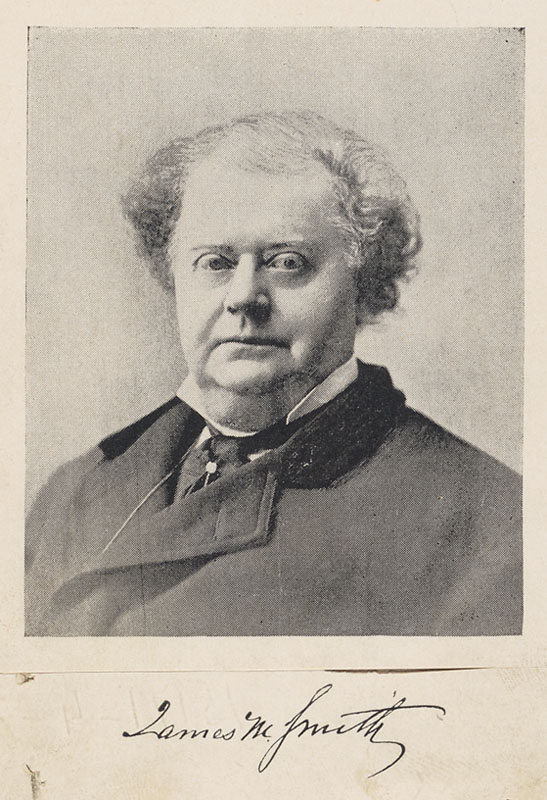
Nominee	James Milton Smith
Party	Democratic
Popular vote	39,905
Percentage	99.73%
- Results by County; Smith: 60–70% >90% No Data
Governor before election
Benjamin F. Conley (Acting)
Republican
Elected Governor
James Milton Smith
Democratic

The 1871 Georgia gubernatorial special election was held on December 19, 1871, in order to elect the Governor of Georgia following the resignation of Governor Rufus Bullock. Democratic nominee and incumbent Speaker of the Georgia House of Representatives James Milton Smith ran unopposed and thus won the election.

== General election ==
On election day, December 19, 1871, Democratic nominee James Milton Smith won the election with 99.73% of the vote, thereby gaining Democratic control over the office of Governor. Smith was sworn in as the 48th Governor of Georgia on January 12, 1872.

=== Results ===
Georgia gubernatorial special election, 1871
Party	Candidate	Votes	%
Democratic	James Milton Smith	39,905	99.73
	Others	109	0.27
Total votes		40,014	100.00
Democratic gain from Republican			
