= 1870 Rhode Island gubernatorial election =

- April 6, 1870
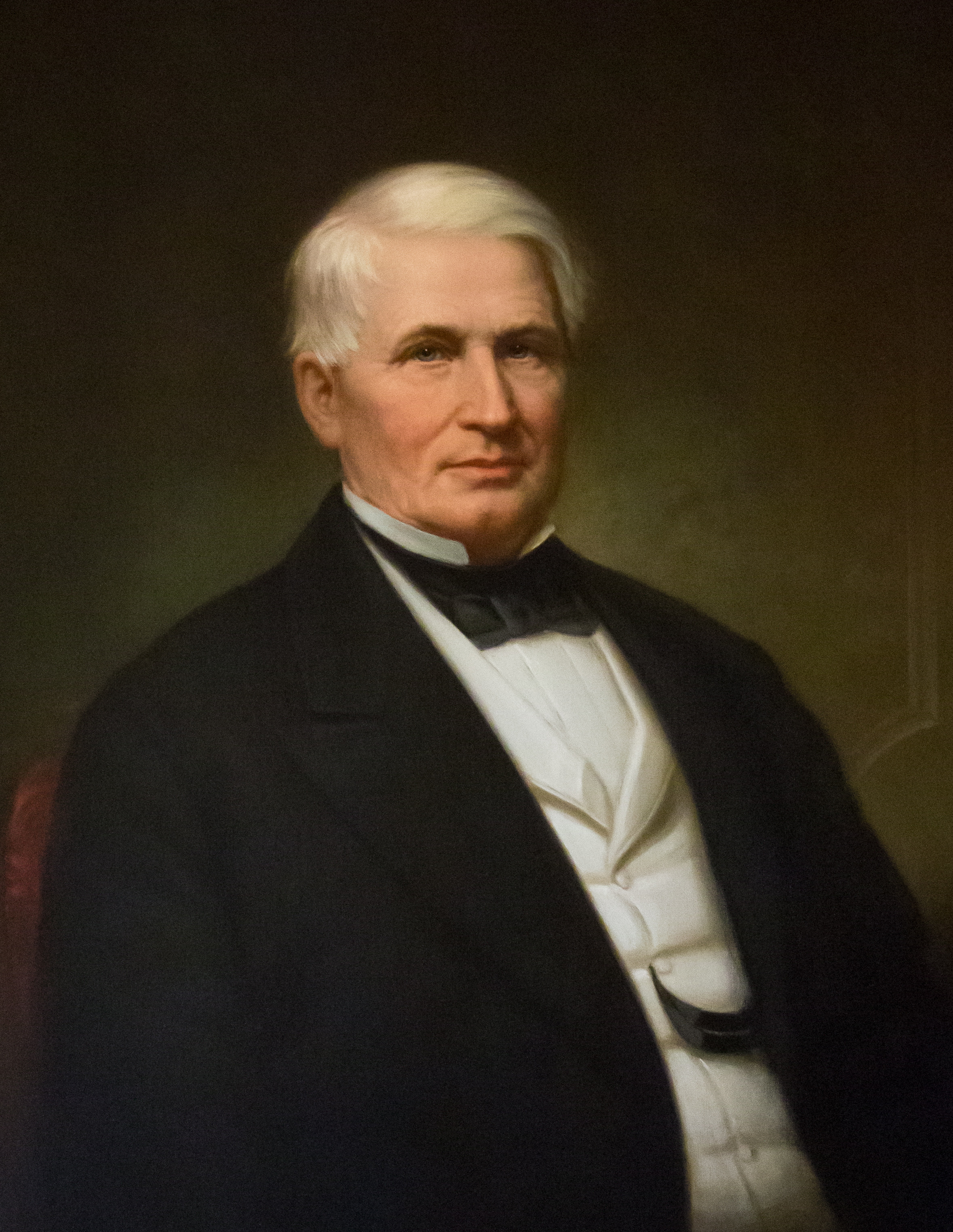
Nominee	Seth Padelford	Lyman Pierce
Party	Republican	Democratic
Popular vote	10,337	6,295
Percentage	62.15%	37.85%
- County results Padelford: 50–60% 60–70%
Governor before election
Seth Padelford
Republican
Elected Governor
Seth Padelford
Republican

The 1870 Rhode Island gubernatorial election took place on April 6, 1870, in order to elect the governor of Rhode Island. Republican candidate and incumbent governor Seth Padelford won his second one-year term as governor over Democratic candidate Lyman Pierce.

== Background ==
In the 1869 Rhode Island gubernatorial election, Lieutenant Governor of Rhode Island Seth Padelford defeated Democratic nominee Lyman Pierce with 68 percent of the vote. Pierce was a perennial candidate who had first sought the governorship in 1866 against Republican incumbent Ambrose Burnside.

== Candidates ==
- Seth Padelford (Republican) was the incumbent governor. He had previously served in the Rhode Island House of Representatives for two years, ran and lost in the 1860 Rhode Island gubernatorial election as the Republican nominee, and was the Lieutenant Governor of Rhode Island from 1863 to 1865 under James Y. Smith.
- Lyman Pierce (Democrat) had been nominated in the previous year's election to become the governor of Rhode Island.

== Election ==
Padelford won the election over Lyman by around 25 percent of the vote. He swept all five of the states counties.

1870 Rhode Island gubernatorial election
Party	Candidate	Votes	%
Republican	Seth Padelford	10,337	62.15
Democratic	Lyman Pierce	6,295	37.85
Total votes		16,632	100.00
Republican hold			
