= 1872 United States elections =

- ← 1870 1871 1872 1873 1874 → Presidential election year
- Election day: November 5
- Incumbent president: ▌Ulysses S. Grant (R)
- Next Congress: 43rd

Presidential election
- Partisan control: Republican hold
- Popular vote margin: Republican +11.8%
- Electoral vote
- Ulysses S. Grant (R): 286
- Horace Greeley (LR/D): 66
- 1872 presidential election results. Numbers indicate the electoral votes won by each candidate. Red denotes states won by Grant. The other colors denote electoral votes for various members of the Liberal Republican and Democratic parties; Greeley did not receive electoral votes because he died after the election.

Senate elections
- Overall control: Republican hold
- Seats contested: 24 of 74 seats
- Net seat change: Democratic +2
- Results: Democratic gain Democratic hold Republican gain Republican hold Liberal Republican gain Legislature Failed to Elect

House elections
- Overall control: Republican hold
- Seats contested: All 292 voting members
- Net seat change: Republican +61
- Results: Democratic hold Democratic gain Republican hold Republican gain Conservative hold Conservative gain Liberal Republican gain Independent Gain

Elections were held on November 5, 1872, electing the members of the 43rd United States Congress. The election took place during the Third Party System. The election took place during the Reconstruction Era, and many Southerners were disfranchised. Despite a split in the party, the Republicans retained control of the presidency and both houses of Congress.

In the presidential election, the Republican president Ulysses S. Grant easily defeated the Liberal Republican newspaper editor Horace Greeley. Greeley's Liberal Republicans campaigned on civil service reform and an end to Reconstruction. Eager to defeat Grant, the Democratic Party also nominated Greeley. Greeley died after the election but prior to the meeting of the electoral college, so most of Greeley's electoral votes went to his running mate, Missouri Governor Benjamin Gratz Brown, as well as former senator Thomas A. Hendricks of Indiana.

Following the 1870 census, 49 seats were added to the House. Republicans made major gains in the House, picking up new seats while also winning seats from the Democrats.

In the Senate, Republicans continued to control a commanding majority, but lost multiple seats to the Democrats and Liberal Republicans.

== See also ==
- 1872 United States presidential election
- 1872–73 United States House of Representatives elections
- 1872–73 United States Senate elections
