= 1868 United States elections =

- ← 1866 1867 1868 1869 1870 → Presidential election year
- Election day: November 3
- Incumbent president: ▌Andrew Johnson (D) (Note: Johnson was elected as vice president on the National Union ticket in 1864 and assumed the presidency in 1865 after the assassination of Abraham Lincoln. After becoming president, Johnson broke with Lincoln's Republican Party, attempted to form his own party, and was a candidate for the presidential nomination at the 1868 Democratic National Convention.)
- Next Congress: 41st

Presidential election
- Partisan control: Republican gain
- Popular vote margin: Republican +5.4%
- Electoral vote
- Ulysses S. Grant (R): 214
- Horatio Seymour (D): 80
- 1868 presidential election results. Red denotes states won by Grant, blue denotes states won by Seymour, and green denotes states that had not yet been restored to the Union. Numbers indicate the electoral votes won by each candidate.

Senate elections
- Overall control: Republican hold
- Seats contested: 25 of 66 seats
- Net seat change: 0
- 1868–69 Senate election results. Red denotes states won by the Republican Party, blue denotes states won by the Democratic Party, light gray denotes states where no election was held, and green denotes states that had not yet been restored to the Union.

House elections
- Overall control: Republican hold
- Seats contested: All 243 voting members
- Net seat change: Democratic +20
- 1868–69 House of Representatives election results. Red denotes districts won by the Republican Party, blue denotes districts won by the Democratic Party, and orange denotes districts won by the Conservative Party.

Elections were held on November 3, 1868, electing the members of the 41st United States Congress. The election took place during the Reconstruction Era, and many Southerners were disfranchised. However, Congress's various Reconstruction Acts required the various states of Southern United States to allow male Black Americans to vote, and their voting power was significant to the election results.

In the presidential election, Republican General Ulysses S. Grant defeated Democratic former governor Horatio Seymour of New York. Incumbent President Andrew Johnson sought the 1868 Democratic nomination, but Seymour took the nomination after twenty-two ballots.

Democrats gained several seats in the House elections, but Republicans continued to maintain a commanding majority. In the Senate elections, Republicans and Democrats both won seats, but Republicans maintained a huge majority in the chamber.

== See also ==
- 1868 United States presidential election
- 1868–69 United States House of Representatives elections
- 1868–69 United States Senate elections
