= Governor Conley =

Governor Conley may refer to:

- Benjamin F. Conley (1815–1886), 47th Governor of Georgia
- William G. Conley (1866–1940), 18th Governor of West Virginia

== See also ==
- John Connally (1917–1993), 39th Governor of Texas
- Henry Connelly (1800–1866), Governor of New Mexico Territory
