= 1871 French legislative election in Senegal =

Elections to the French National Assembly were held in Senegal on 3 April 1871 as part of the wider French elections. Lafon de Fongaufier was elected.

== Electoral system ==
The single Senegalese seat in the National Assembly had been abolished by a decree of 2 February 1852. However, it was restored in 1871.

== Results ==
Candidate	Votes	%
Lafon de Fongaufier	1,186	59.90
Clément de Ville-Suzanne	312	15.76
Albert Teisseire	158	7.98
Bogandé	121	6.11
Faidherre	92	4.65
Alfred Cabueil	36	1.82
Frédériuc Carrére	34	1.72
J.J. Crespin	31	1.57
Alexandre Caminade	8	0.40
Haurigot	2	0.10
Total	1,980	100.00
Total votes	1,980	–
Registered voters/turnout	4,277	46.29
Source: Official Journal

== Aftermath ==
A new electoral law was passed in 1875 that did not mention Senegal, meaning no MP was elected in 1876. However, a decree of 1879 reinstated the seat.
