= List of mayors of Augusta, Georgia =

This is a list of mayors of Augusta, Georgia, United States, including the former city of Augusta and 1996–present consolidated Augusta–Richmond County.

== Former city of Augusta ==
| Name | Sworn in | Left office | Notes | Reference |
|---|---|---|---|---|
| John Milton | 1792 | | | |
| Thomas Cumming | 1798 | 1799 | By state legislation on 31 January 1798, Augusta was incorporated as a city. Intendants served one-year terms. Father of Henry Cumming. | |
| Thomas Cumming | 1799 | 1800 | Intendant | |
| Abraham Jones | Apr 1800 | 1801 | Intendant; Cumming was reelected but declined to serve; Jones was sworn into office on 18 April. | |
| Joshua Meals | 1801 | 1802 | Intendant | |
| John Willson | 1802 | 1803 | Intendant | |
| John Murray | 1803 | 1804 | Intendant | |
| TBD | 1804 | 1805 | Intendant | |
| William Johnston Hobby, Sr. | 1805 | 1806 | Intendant | |
| Thomas Flournoy | 1806 | 1807 | Intendant | |
| John B. Barnes | 1807 | 1808 | Intendant | |
| Freeman Walker | 1808 | - | Intendant | |
| John Catlett | 1809 | 1809 | Intendant | |
| John Hutchinson | 1809 | 1812 | Intendant | |
| James S. Walker | - | 1812 | Intendant | |
| Seaborn Jones | Apr 1813 | 1814 | Intendant | |
| Joseph Hutchinson | Apr 1814 | 1815 | Intendant | |
| Walter Leigh | Apr 1815 | 1817 | Intendant | |
| Freeman Walker | - | 1817 | Intendant | |
| Freeman Walker | Dec 1818 | 1819 | By state legislation on 19 December 1817, the position of "intendant" was restyled as "mayor". | |
| Nicholas Ware | Nov 1819 | 1821 | His Telfair Street home "Ware's Folly" is now the location of Gertrude Herbert Institute of Art. | |
| Richard Henry Wilde | - | 1822 | | |
| Freeman Walker | Apr 1822 | 1823 | | |
| Robert Raymond Reid | Mar 1823 | 1825 | Served two one-year terms, consecutive, and another one-year term | |
| William W. Holt | Oct 1825 | 1826 | | |
| Robert Raymond Reid | Apr 1826 | 1827 | Previously served two one-year terms, consecutive | |
| Samuel Hale | Apr 1827 | 1837 | Served two 1-year terms | |
| Alfred Cumming | 1836 | | Appointed governor of Territory of Utah in 1858 | |
| John Phinizy | Apr 1837 | 1838 | First Italian-American mayor of any U.S. city (original spelling: "Finizzi") | |
| Samuel Hale | Apr 1838 | 1839 | Served two 1-year terms. | |
| Alfred Cumming | Apr 1839 | 1840 | | |
| Dr. Daniel Hook | Apr 1840 | 1841 | Served two one-year terms | |
| Martin M. Dye | Apr 1841 | 1842 | | |
| Dr. Daniel Hook | Apr 1842 | 1843 | Served two one-year terms | |
| Martin M. Dye | Apr 1843 | 1846 | Served four one-year terms; three were consecutive | |
| Dr. Lewis D. Ford | Apr 1846 | 1848 | Served two one-year terms, consecutive | |
| Dr. Ignatius P. Garvin | Apr 1848 | 1849 | | |
| James B. / P. Bishop | Apr 1849 | 1850 | | |
| Thomas W. Miller | Apr 1850 | 1852 | Served two one-year terms, consecutive | |
| Dr. William E. Dearing | Apr 1852 | 1854 | Served two one-year terms, consecutive, and another one-year term | |
| Abner P. Robertson | Apr 1854 | 1855 | | |
| Dr. William E. Dearing | Apr 1855 | 1856 | Previously served two one-year terms, consecutive | |
| George W. Evans | Apr 1856 | 1857 | | |
| Benjamin F. Conley | Apr 1857 | 1859 | Served two oe-year terms, consecutive; later a governor of Georgia | |
| Foster Blodgett, Jr. | Apr 1859 | 1861 | Served two 1-year terms, consecutive. | |
| Robert H. May | Apr 1861 | 1866 | Served five one-year terms running consecutively during the period of the Civil War; later served four additional three-year terms. In 1865, he was ordered by Georgia Governor Joseph E. Brown to burn the large amounts of cotton stored in Augusta warehouses "on the approach of the Yankees," so it would not fall into enemy's hands. As it turned out, the Union Army never came to Augusta. | |
| James T. Gardiner | Apr 1866 | 8 Aug 1866 | Resigned after four months. Publisher of The Daily Constitutionalist, a local newspaper. | |
| Abner P. Robertson | 8 Aug 1866 | 20 Aug 1866 | Mayor pro tem city council; filled Gardiner's unexpired term until special election held | |
| John Foster | 20 Aug 1866 | 1867 | Special election to fill unexpired term | |
| Foster Blodgett, Jr. | Dec 1867 | 1868 | Military appointment. In 1867, the Southern states were divided into military districts, and military tribunals were set up to appoint government officials during this period. | |
| Henry F. Russell | Dec 1868 | 1869 | | |
| Joseph V. H. Allen | Jan 1870 | 1871 | | |
| Charles Estes | Dec 1871 | 1876 | Served six 1-year terms, consecutive. | |
| John U. Meyer | Dec 1876 | 1879 | Term of office changed to three years. | |
| Robert H. May | Dec 1879 | 1891 | Served four three-year terms, having previously served five one-year terms during the Civil War era. He was coroner of Richmond County from 1900 until his death on 7 February 1903. | |
| James H. Alexander | Jan 1891 | 1894 | | |
| William B. Young | Jan 1894 | 1897 | Great-great-great-great-grandfather of Buckley Campana and Stephen Campana | |
| Patrick Walsh | Mar 1897 | Mar 1899 | Died in office on 19 March 1899 | |
| Jacob Phinizy | Mar 1899 | 18 Apr 1899 | Mayor pro tem city council; filled Walsh's unexpired term | |
| Charles A. Robbe | 18 Apr 1899 | 7 Jul 1900 | Died in office | |
| Thomas Barrett, Sr. | 8 Jul 1900 | 10 Jul 1900 | Mayor pro tem city council; Filled Robbe's unexpired term | |
| Alfred Martin | 10 Jul 1900 | Jan 1901 | Special election to fill unexpired term | |
| Jacob Phinzy | Jan 1901 | 1904 | Once owner of "Augusta's first skyscraper", known today as the Marion Building at 739 Broad Street | |
| Richard E. Allen, Sr. | Jan 1904 | 1907 | Responsible for much of Augusta's first street paving efforts | |
| William M. Dunbar | Jan 1907 | 1910 | Postmaster of the United States House of Representatives for the 62nd through 65th Congresses (1911–1919) | |
| Thomas Barrett, Sr. | 1910 | Jan 1913 | Barrett Plaza, located in front of the Federal Court House & 800 block of Telfair Street, is named for Thomas Barrett, Sr. | |
| Linwood C. Hayne | 1913 | Jan 1916 | | |
| James R. Littleton | 1916 | Jan 1919 | | |
| William P. White | 1919 | Jan 1922 | The Appleby Library was White's home until his widow sold it in 1928 to Scott B. Appleby. Appleby donated the house in 1954 to the Augusta City Council for use as a library. | |
| Julian Smith | 1923 | 1925 | The Julian Smith Casino, operated by the city recreation department, is named after Smith. | |
| Raleigh Daniel | | | Daniel Field was named after him, against his wishes. | |
| Richard Allen, Jr. | 1934 | 1940 | | |
| Dr. William D. Jennings | 1951 | 1953 | | |
| H. L. Hamilton | 1953 | 1958 | | |
| Millard A. Beckum | 1958 | 1963 | | |
| George "Buster" Albert Sancken Jr. | 1964 | 1970 | | |
| Millard A. Beckum | 1970 | 1972 | Mayor during the Augusta race riot of May 11, 1970 | |
| Lewis "Pop" A. Newman | 1973 | 1981 | | |
| Ed McIntyre | 1981 | 1984 | First African-American mayor of city of Augusta | |
| Charles DeVaney | 1984 | 1996 | Last mayor of former city of Augusta | |

== Consolidated Augusta–Richmond County ==
| Image | Name | Sworn in | Left office | Notes | Reference |
|---|---|---|---|---|---|
| | Larry Sconyers | 1996 | 1999 | First mayor of consolidated Augusta-Richmond County, owner and operator of Sconyers Bar-B-Que | |
| | Bob Young | 1999 | 2005 | Longtime local television news anchor (WJBF-TV) before election as mayor; left mayor's office in 2005 to U.S. Department of Housing and Urban Development appointment by president George W. Bush | |
| | Willie Mays | 2005 | 2006 | Commissioner chosen by city commission following Bob Young's departure to serve as interim mayor until special election. First African-American to serve as mayor of consolidated Augusta-Richmond County. | |
| | Deke Copenhaver | 2005 | 2015 | | |
| | Hardie Davis | 2015 | 2022 | Second African-American mayor and first African-American elected mayor of consolidated Augusta-Richmond County | |
| | Garnett L. Johnson | 2023 | Incumbent | Third African-American mayor of consolidated Augusta-Richmond County | |

== See also ==
- Timeline of Augusta, Georgia
- Consolidated city–county
