= Robert H. May =

American politician from Georgia (1822–1903)

Mayor of Augusta, Georgia
- In office April 2, 1861 – March 30, 1866
- Preceded by: Foster Blodgett, Jr.
- Succeeded by: James T. Gardiner
- In office December 2, 1879 – December 1, 1891
- Preceded by: John U. Meyer
- Succeeded by: James H. Alexander

Personal details
- Born: November 28, 1822 Augusta, Georgia
- Died: February 7, 1903 (aged 80) Augusta, Georgia
- Party: Democratic

Robert H. May (November 28, 1822 – February 7, 1903) was an American businessman and Mayor of Augusta, Georgia.

== Life ==
May was born in Augusta, Georgia. With his parents, he shortly moved to the neighboring counties of Lincoln and Columbia, where they farmed. In his early teens, May moved back to Augusta, Georgia, where he was apprenticed to be a wheelwright with Hubert & Roll. He eventually became a partner in the business, and in 1852 started his own carriage manufacturing business, named R. H. May & Co.; which soon became a leading manufacture of carriages, buggies and farm wagons throughout the south.

On February 27, 1845, Robert May married Josephine A. Calhoun, daughter of David Wardlaw Calhoun and Adeline Augusta (née Dickinson) Calhoun of Augusta, Georgia. The wedding was at the home of the bride and officiated by Josiah Lewis, pastor of St. Johns Methodist church; which Calhoun was connected. This union produced four children: Aletha Francis (1846–1916), Elizabeth Adeline (1847–1848), James Thomas (1848–1924) and Josephine (1851–1852).

As May's business and family grew, he became active in community affairs. He was a member of the Augusta City Council for several terms before being elected to the mayor's office in 1861. In 1862, on his suggestion, the city council organized and sponsored the Augusta Purveying Association, which distributed funds and goods among the needy citizens. May gave freely of his own money to help the needy, actions that were remembered in the years ahead when he ran for re-election. He served five 1-year terms during the period of 1861-66 and was well respected by government officials throughout the state and citizens of Augusta, a like.

Toward the end of the Civil War, Governor Joseph E. Brown ordered May to burn the large amounts of cotton stored in the warehouses throughout Augusta to prevent it from falling into the Union Army's hands. In an open letter to all cotton owners in the city, May asked that they move their cotton from the city limits, because this would prevent a risk of the entire city being destroyed. As it turned out, the Union Army never came to Augusta; and the cotton was never destroyed, thus saving many of the pre-war buildings.

Again in 1879, the citizens of Augusta called upon Robert May to run the city of Augusta and elected him to four 3-year terms as Mayor through 1891. During these years, May oversaw the expansion of the city and saw Augusta, Georgia become a leading winter resort that attracted giants of industry and sitting U.S. presidents.

May was elected to three 2-year terms as Coroner of Richmond County starting in 1898 until his death in 1903.

Robert H. May died on February 7, 1903 in Augusta, Georgia at the age of 80 and was buried in Magnolia Cemetery in Augusta. The park across from Magnolia Cemetery he now rest, bears his name.
