= Rufus Bullock =

American politician and businessman (1834–1907)

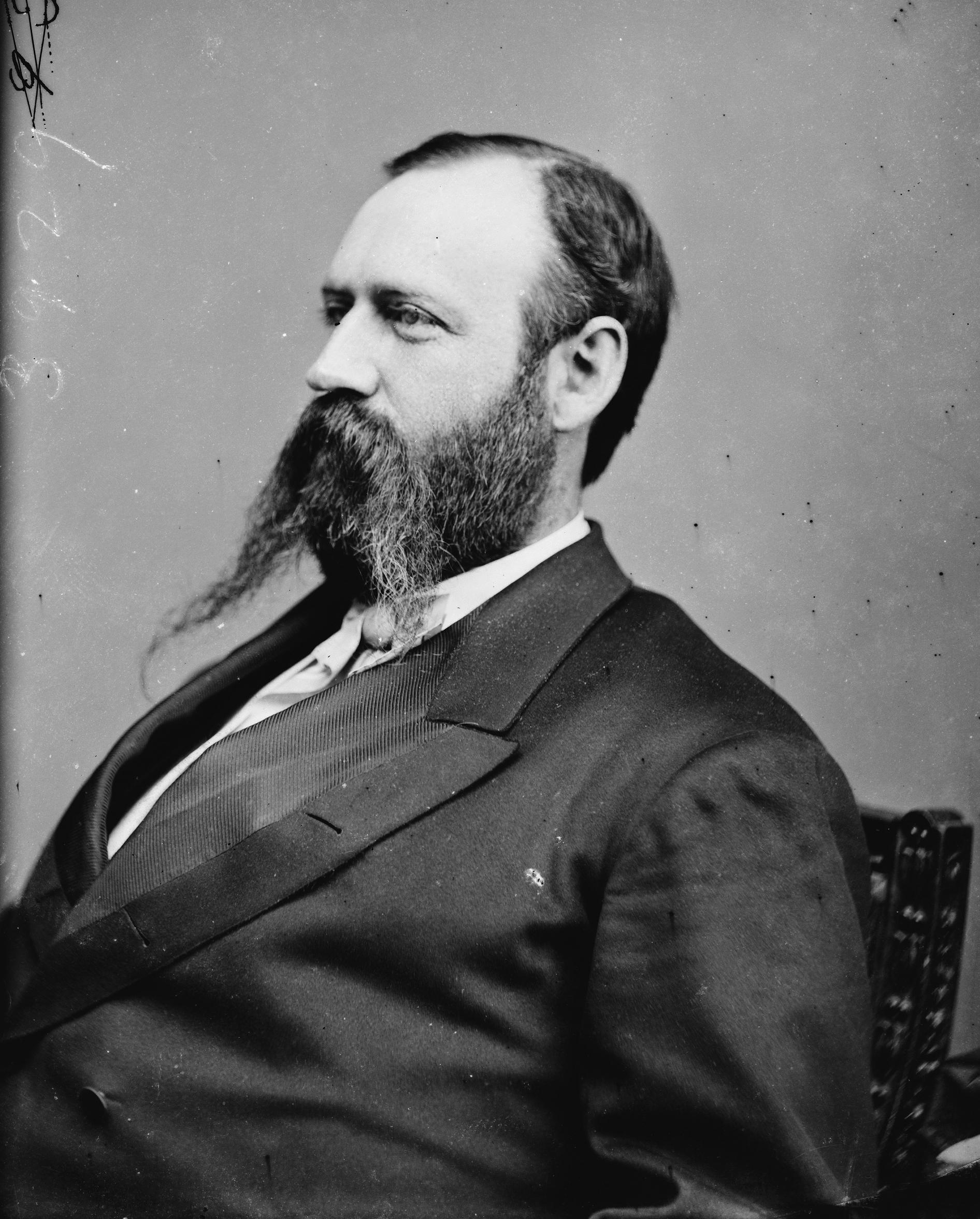

46th Governor of Georgia
- In office July 4, 1868 – October 30, 1871
- Preceded by: Thomas H. Ruger
- Succeeded by: Benjamin F. Conley

Personal details
- Born: March 28, 1834 Bethlehem, New York, U.S.
- Died: April 27, 1907 (aged 73) Albion, New York, U.S.
- Party: Republican

Military service
- Allegiance: Confederate States of America
- Branch/service: Confederate States Army
- Rank: Lieutenant colonel
- Unit: Quartermaster's Office
- Battles/wars: American Civil War

Rufus Brown Bullock (March 28, 1834 – April 27, 1907) was an American politician and businessman from New York. A Republican, he served as the State of Georgia's governor during the Reconstruction Era. He called for equal economic opportunity and political rights for blacks and whites in Georgia. He also promoted public education for both, and encouraged railroads, banks, and industrial development. During his governorship, he requested federal military help to ensure the rights of freedmen; this made him "the most hated man in the state", and he had to flee the state without completing his term. After returning to Georgia and being found "not guilty" of corruption charges, for three decades afterwards he was an esteemed private citizen.

== Early life ==
Bullock was born in Bethlehem, New York and moved to Augusta, Georgia, in 1857 for his job with the telegraph company Adams Express. He served in the Confederate Army, setting up railroad and telegraph lines, rising to the rank of lieutenant colonel in the Quartermaster's Office. After the war, Bullock served as president of the Macon and Augusta Railroad in 1867, and established the Augusta First National Bank.

== Political life ==
Bullock entered politics as a Republican delegate to the Georgia Constitutional Convention of 1867–1868. Despite serving in the Confederate Army, Bullock was nominated by the Republican Party for the 1868 Georgia gubernatorial election, and defeated Democratic nominee and former Major general of the Confederate States Army John B. Gordon on 20 April 1868. Bullock was sworn into office as the 46th governor of Georgia on 21 July 1868, becoming the first Republican governor of Georgia.

After Georgia ratified the Fourteenth Amendment to the Constitution, the Omnibus Act declared that states were entitled to representation in Congress as one of the states of the Union. Georgia again lost the right to representation in Congress because the General Assembly expelled twenty-eight black members and prevented blacks from voting in the 1868 presidential election (see Original 33). In response to an appeal from Bullock, Georgia was again placed under military rule as part of the Georgia Act of December 22, 1869. This made Bullock a hated political figure. After various allegations of scandal and ridicule, in 1871 he was obliged by the Ku Klux Klan to resign the governorship, and felt it prudent to leave the state. He was succeeded by Republican State Senate president Benjamin Conley, who served as Governor for the two remaining months of the term to which Bullock had been elected. Conley was succeeded by James M. Smith, a Democrat, and no Republican would serve as governor of Georgia again until Sonny Perdue in 2003.

== Postbellum life ==
He later became president of the Atlanta Chamber of Commerce, and in 1895 served as master of ceremonies for the Cotton States and International Exposition. Bullock introduced the speaker, Booker T. Washington, who gave his famous "Atlanta Compromise" speech.

== Death and legacy ==
Bullock died in Albion, New York, in 1907 and was buried in Mt. Albion Cemetery nearby.

Bullock has had both detractors and admirers. According to the New Georgia Encyclopedia, he was the last progressive governor of Georgia until Jimmy Carter.

He is the only governor of Georgia since 1850 of whom there is no portrait in the Georgia State Capitol.

Margaret Mitchell, in her novel, Gone with the Wind, included comments relating to Bullock.

Party political offices
| First | Republican nominee for Governor of Georgia; 1868 | Vacant Title next held by D. Walker |
Political offices
| Preceded by Charles J. Jenkins | Governor of Georgia; 1868–1871 | Succeeded by Benjamin F. Conley |
