= 1868 Georgia gubernatorial election =

- April 20, 1868
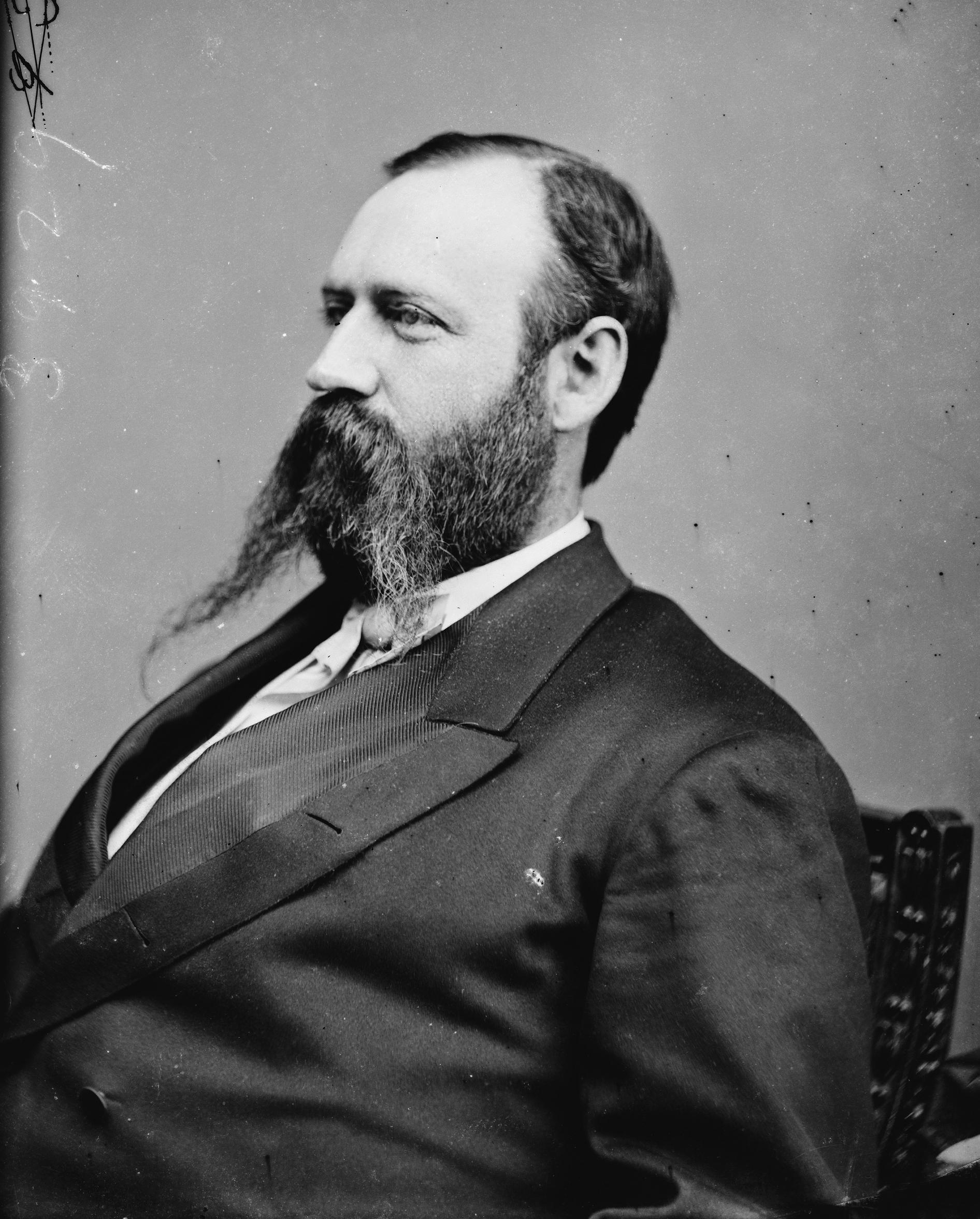

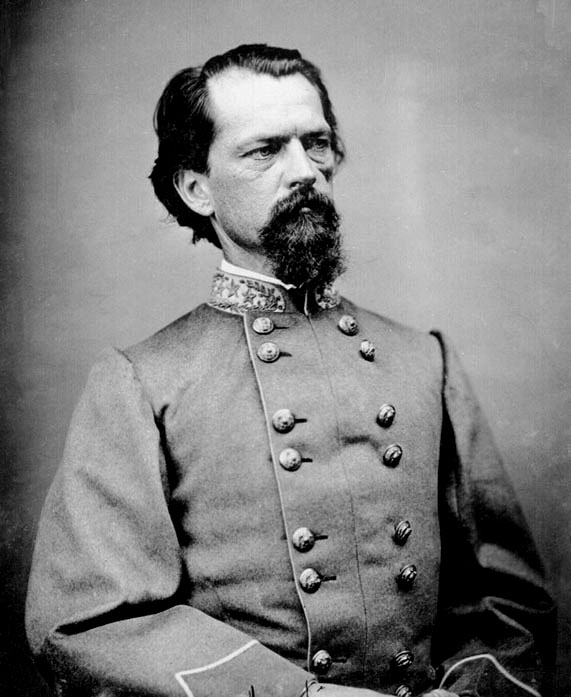
Nominee	Rufus Bullock	John B. Gordon
Party	Republican	Democratic
Popular vote	83,527	76,356
Percentage	52.24%	47.76%
- Results by County: Bullock: 50–60% 60–70% 70–80% 80–90% >90% Gordon: 50–60% 60–70% 70–80% 80–90% >90% No vote
Governor before election
Thomas H. Ruger (Provisional Governor)
Military
Elected Governor
Rufus Bullock
Republican

The 1868 Georgia gubernatorial election was held on April 20, 1868, in order to elect the Governor of the U.S. state of Georgia. Republican nominee and former Lieutenant colonel of the Confederate States Army Rufus Bullock defeated Democratic nominee and former Major general of the Confederate States Army John B. Gordon.

== General election ==
On election day, April 20, 1868, Republican nominee Rufus Bullock won the election by a margin of 7,171 votes against his opponent Democratic nominee John B. Gordon, thereby gaining Republican control over the office of Governor. Bullock was sworn in as the 46th Governor of Georgia on July 21, 1868.

=== Results ===
Georgia gubernatorial election, 1868
Party	Candidate	Votes	%
Republican	Rufus Bullock	83,527	52.24
Democratic	John B. Gordon	76,356	47.76
Total votes		159,883	100.00
Republican gain from Democratic			
