= Foster Blodgett =

American politician (1826–1877)

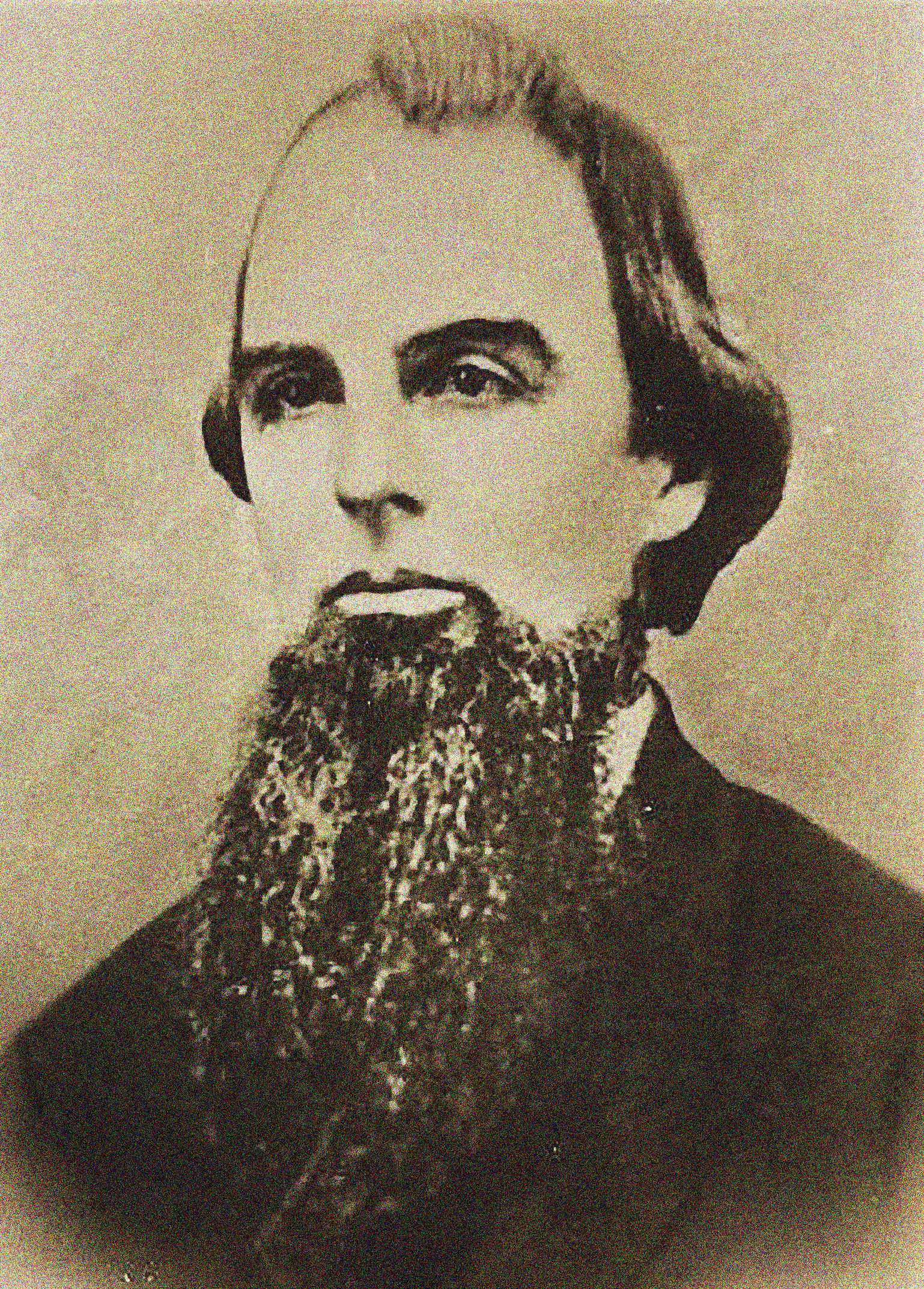

Mayor of Augusta
- In office May 1867 – December 1868
- Appointed by: John Pope
- Preceded by: John Foster
- Succeeded by: Henry F. Russell
- In office 1859–1860
- Preceded by: Benjamin F. Conley
- Succeeded by: Robert H. May

Personal details
- Born: January 15, 1826 Augusta, Georgia, U.S.
- Died: December 3, 1877 (aged 51) Atlanta, Georgia, U.S.
- Resting place: Magnolia Cemetery
- Party: Republican
- Spouse: Louisa Maria Foster
- Children: 11

Military service
- Allegiance: Confederate States
- Branch/service: Confederate States Army
- Years of service: 1861–1862

Foster Blodgett Jr. (15 January 1826 – 3 December 1877) was an American politician elected mayor of Augusta, Georgia, from 1859 to 1860, and returned to the mayoralty via military appointment between 1867 and 1868. Blodgett was elected to the United States Senate by the Georgia General Assembly in 1871, but not seated.

== Life ==
Blodgett was born in Augusta, Georgia. He was mayor of Augusta from 1859 to 1860. His administration was noted for the introduction of Augusta's waterworks system. In December 1860, Blodgett presided over a meeting of Unionists in Augusta. Faced with threats of property damage and death, he served in the Confederate Army until April 1862. Between 1865 and 1868, he was postmaster of Augusta. He was suspended from duties as postmaster in January 1868, due to charges of perjury, for which he had been arrested in 1867. He was reinstated as postmaster in April 1869. Overlapping his tenure as postmaster, Blodgett was appointed as mayor of Augusta by General John Pope in May 1867, a post he held until December 1868.

He was also superintendent of the state railroad.

He was elected chair of the Georgia Republican Party's Central Committee on July 4, 1867. Blodgett was called by the prosecution as a witness and testified at the impeachment trial of Andrew Johnson on April 9, 1868.

Before the December 1870 United States Senate elections in Georgia, Blodget wrote, "It is the duty of the white citizens of the state to see that the colored citizens are protected in their exercise of their constitutional rights." Though others were elected to Georgia's seats on the United States Senate, Blodgett was selected by the Georgia legislature for a term beginning in 1871. The Republican-controlled U.S. Senate refused to seat him.

The University of Georgia Libraries have a collection of papers related to him.

He died on December 3, 1877, in Atlanta, Georgia, due to typhoid fever. He is buried at the Magnolia Cemetery.

== Personal life ==
He was married to his wife, Louisa Maria Foster. They had eleven children.
