= Hardie Davis =

American politician from Georgia

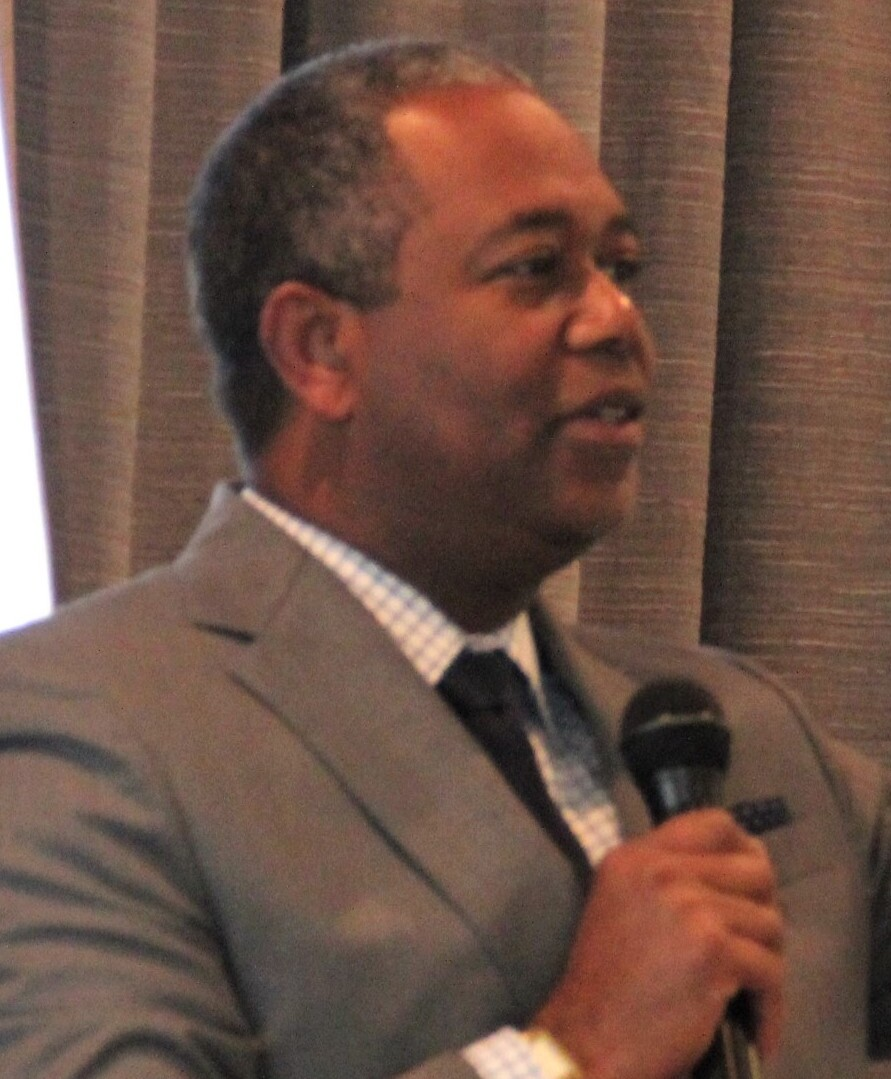

Mayor of Augusta-Richmond County
- In office January 1, 2015 – December 31, 2022
- Preceded by: Deke Copenhaver
- Succeeded by: Garnett L. Johnson

Member of the Georgia State Senate from the 22nd district
- In office February 8, 2010 – 2014
- Preceded by: Ed Tarver
- Succeeded by: Harold V. Jones II

Member of the Georgia House of Representatives from the 122nd district
- In office January 8, 2007 – 2009
- Preceded by: Pete Warren
- Succeeded by: Earnest Smith

Personal details
- Born: December 5, 1968 (age 57) Macon, Georgia, U.S.
- Party: Democratic

Hardie Davis (born December 5, 1968) is an American politician who has served as the Mayor of consolidated Augusta-Richmond County, Georgia from January 1, 2015, to December 31, 2022. He was the second African American elected mayor of Augusta since the city and county governments consolidated in 1996. He previously served in the Georgia House of Representatives from the 122nd district from 2007 to 2009 and in the Georgia State Senate from the 22nd district from 2010 to 2014.
