= 1871 French legislative election in Algeria =

Elections to the National Assembly of France were held in Algeria in February 1871. Two members were elected from each of the three départements, Algiers, Constantine and Oran. However, two winning candidates (who both stood in Algiers and one also in Oran) also won seats in mainland France, and by-elections were held in Algiers on 11 July and Oran on 12 July.

== Electoral system ==
The franchise was restricted to French citizens, which prevented most of the Muslim Arab population from voting; Muslims were deemed to be French subjects falling under the Muslim personal status law. Although they could request citizenship, few did as it involved committing apostasy as it required them to renounce Muslim law.

== Results ==
Département	Candidate	Votes	%	Notes
Algiers	Léon Gambetta (Note: Gambetta and Garibaldi were both also won seats in mainland France. By-elections were held in Algiers on 11 July in which Auguste Warnier (6,038 votes) and Benoît Vuillermoz (6,371 votes) were elected. Vuillermoz later resigned and was replaced by Adolphe Crémieux, who defeated Bertholon by 5,552 votes to 4,446.)	12,300		Elected
Algiers	Giuseppe Garibaldi	10,680		Elected
Algiers	Auguste Warnier	5,058		–
Constantine	Marcel Lucet	4,303		Elected
Constantine	Claude Colas	3,845		Elected
Oran	Joseph Andrieu (Note: Andrieu resigned shortly after winning his seat. With Gambetta also having resigned his Oran seat due to winning elsewhere, a by-election for both seats was held on 12 July in which Alexis Lambert and Rémy Jacques were elected. However, their election was annulled by the National Assembly (the totals won by the two candidates - 5,059 and 2,288 - exceeded the total number of votes - 7,193) but were both re-elected in January 1872.)	7,028		Elected
Oran	Léon Gambetta	5,993		Elected
Oran	Rémy Jacques	2,175		–
Source: National Assembly of France

== See also ==
- 1871 French legislative election
