= Julian Smith Casino =

Coordinates: 33.490566°N 82.007169°W

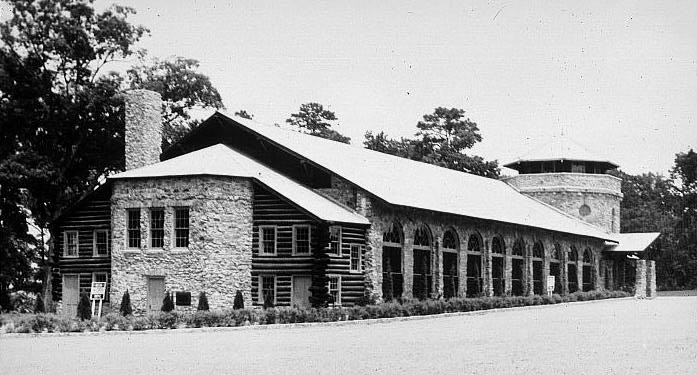
Julian Smith Casino ca. 1936

The Julian Smith Casino in Augusta, Georgia is not a gambling establishment as persons outside the CSRA might think from its name. The casino part of its name is in the older sense of a place of recreation, not just a place of gambling. It is named after Julian Smith, a former mayor of Augusta. It is located at Lake Olmstead Park and can handle a banquet function for 300.
