= 1869 Honduran presidential election =

Presidential elections were held in Honduras in 1869. The result was a victory for José María Medina.

== Background ==
Incumbent president Medina was constitutionally barred from running for a new term. After urging local authorities to submit a request to the government to amend the constitution, a Constituent Assembly was convened. The Assembly began in Comayagua on 8 August. On 13 August, article 33 was amended by degree, allowing Medina to be re-elected. He was subsequently proclaimed president for a term of 1 February 1870 to 31 January 1874 without elections being required. The Assembly closed on 19 August 1869.

== Results ==
Following protests from opponents, Medina submitted his presidency to a public vote, which he easily won.

Candidate	Votes	%
José María Medina	10,649	95.16
Against	542	4.84
Total	11,191	100.00
Source: The Library, UC San Diego
