= 1869 Ohio gubernatorial election =

- October 12, 1869
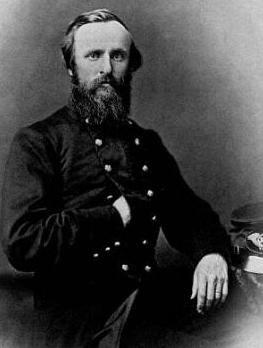

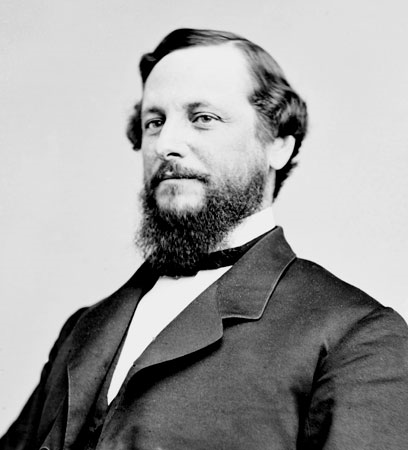
Nominee	Rutherford B. Hayes	George H. Pendleton
Party	Republican	Democratic
Popular vote	236,082	228,581
Percentage	50.74%	49.13%
- County results Hayes: 50–60% 60–70% 70–80% 80–90% Pendleton: 50–60% 60–70% 70–80%
Governor before election
Rutherford B. Hayes
Republican
Elected Governor
Rutherford B. Hayes
Republican

The 1869 Ohio gubernatorial election was held on October 12, 1869. Incumbent Republican Rutherford B. Hayes defeated Democratic nominee George H. Pendleton with 50.74% of the vote.

== General election ==
=== Candidates ===
- Rutherford B. Hayes, incumbent Governor (Republican)
- George H. Pendleton, former U.S. Representative from Cincinnati, nominee for Vice President of the United States in 1864, and candidate for president in 1868 (Democratic)
- Samuel Scott (Prohibition)

=== Results ===
1869 Ohio gubernatorial election
Party	Candidate	Votes	%	±%
Republican	Rutherford B. Hayes (incumbent)	236,082	50.74%	
Democratic	George H. Pendleton	228,581	49.13%	
Prohibition	Samuel Scott	629	0.14%	
Majority		7,501		
Turnout				
Republican hold		Swing		
