= Ed McIntyre =

American politician (1931–2004)

Mayor of Augusta-Richmond County
- In office 1981–1984
- Preceded by: Lewis "Pop" Newman
- Succeeded by: Charles DeVaney

Richmond County Commissioner
- In office 1970–1978

Personal details
- Born: Edward Marlow McIntyre; November 16, 1931 Macon, Georgia, U.S.
- Died: August 14, 2004 (aged 72)
- Party: Democratic

Edward Marlow McIntyre Sr. (November 16, 1931 – August 14, 2004) became the first African American mayor of Augusta, Georgia, in 1981. He had previously served as a county commissioner for Richmond County since 1970, as the first black candidate to win the office. He received a U.S. federal conviction for extortion in 1984. He maintained he was innocent. After his release in 1985, he mounted three unsuccessful campaigns for the mayoralty, in 1990, 1998 and 2002.

A graduate of Morehouse College, McIntyre worked for the Pilgrim Health Life Insurance Company before entering politics.

== See also ==
- List of mayors of Augusta, Georgia
