= 1869 United States Senate election in Wisconsin =

- January 27, 1869
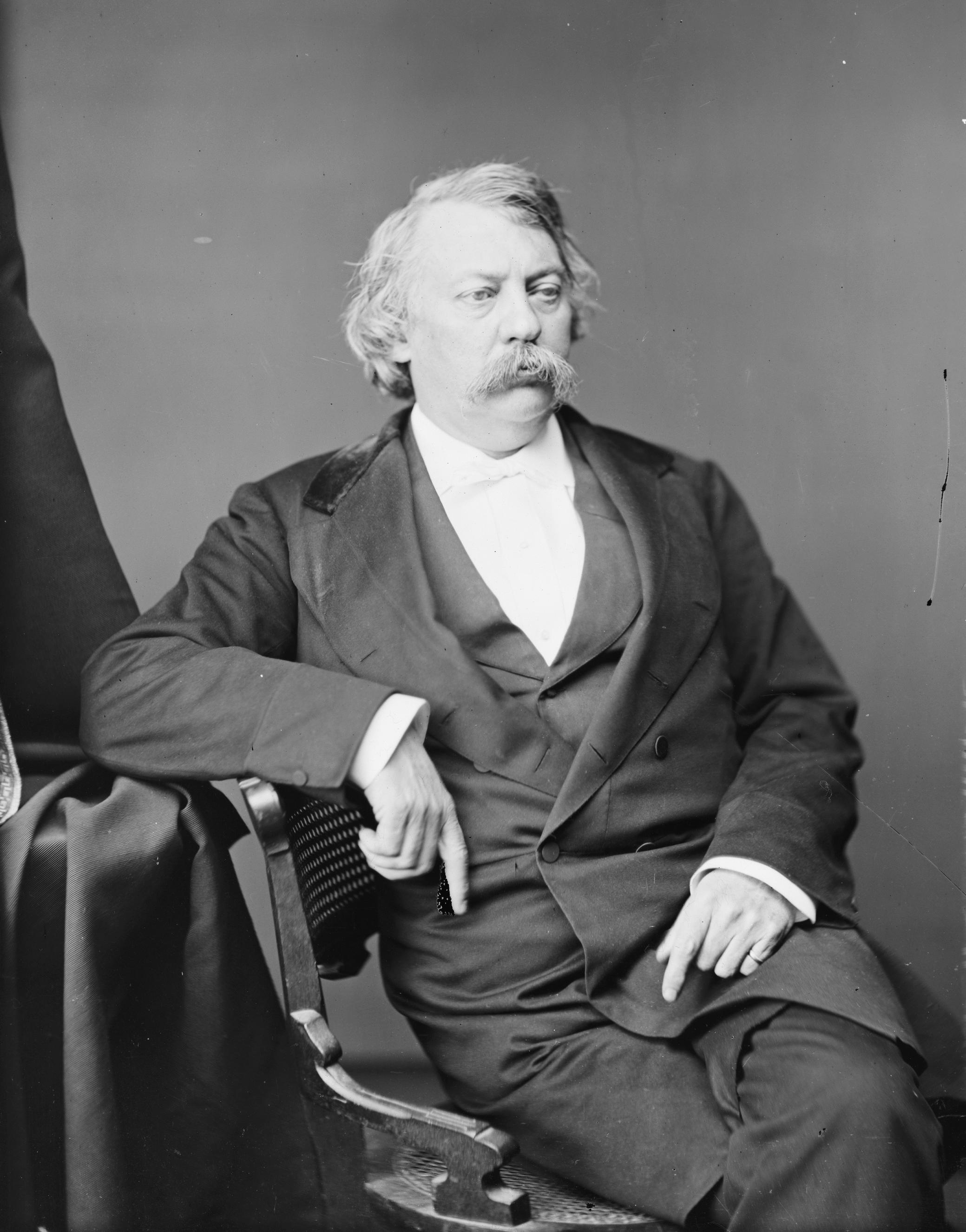

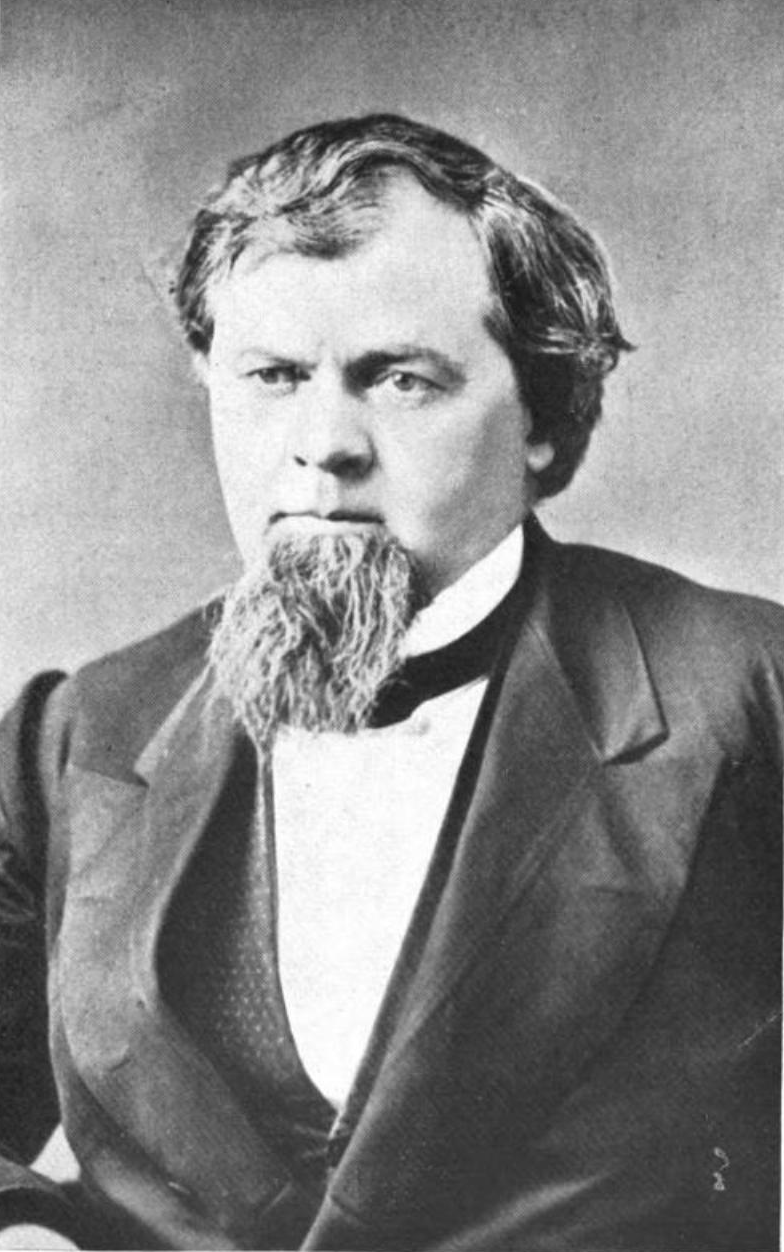
Nominee	Matthew H. Carpenter	George B. Smith	others
Party	Republican	Democratic
Legislative vote	86	41	1
Percentage	67.19%	32.03%	0.78%
U.S. senator before election
James R. Doolittle
Republican
Elected U.S. Senator
Matthew H. Carpenter
Republican

The 1869 United States Senate election in Wisconsin was held in the 22nd Wisconsin Legislature on January 27, 1869. Incumbent Republican U.S. senator James R. Doolittle did not run for re-election. Prominent attorney Matthew H. Carpenter was elected United States senator on the first ballot.

At the start of the 1869 term, Republicans held substantial majorities in both chambers of the Wisconsin Legislature, so had more than enough votes to elect a Republican United States senator. The main drama of the election was in the Republican legislative caucuses as they parsed through Republican candidates and selected the prominent attorney, Matthew H. Carpenter, as their nominee.

== Major candidates ==
=== Democratic ===
- George Baldwin Smith, incumbent state representative, former Attorney General of Wisconsin and former mayor of Madison, Wisconsin.

=== Republican ===
- Matthew H. Carpenter, a prominent attorney who successfully litigated on behalf of the federal government in several key U.S. Supreme Court cases on the constitutionality of the Reconstruction Acts and other Civil War emergency powers.
- Horace Rublee, influential publisher of the Wisconsin State Journal newspaper.
- Edward Salomon, former governor of Wisconsin.
- Cadwallader C. Washburn, incumbent U.S. representative in Wisconsin's 6th congressional district and former Union Army general.

== Results ==
=== Republican nomination ===
Prior to the caucus, several candidate names were floated for the nomination, but the two candidates with the largest apparent base of support were Matthew Carpenter and Cadwallader Washburn. Washburn's allies asserted that he was a more loyal and reliable Republican, as Carpenter had been a Democrat and had written disparagingly about some of Lincoln's policies prior to endorsing and campaigning for Lincoln in 1864. The caucus met on the evening of January 19, 1869. Washburn led the initial informal ballot with 30 votes to Carpenter's 29, with 28 votes going to other candidates. Through the first three formal polls, Washburn and Carpenter remained nearly tied, with Carpenter at 35 and Washburn at 36 on the third formal ballot. On the fourth ballot, support broke toward Carpenter, and he won the nomination on the fifth ballot, receiving 44 of 87 votes.

=== Official vote ===
The 22nd Wisconsin Legislature met in joint session on January 27, 1869, to elect a U.S. senator. The voting went almost exactly along party lines, with one Republican and four Democrats absent. Matthew H. Carpenter received the votes of all other Republican legislators, winning the election.

1st Vote of the 22nd Wisconsin Legislature, January 27, 1869
Party	Candidate	Votes	%
Republican	Matthew H. Carpenter	86 (Note: Carpenter received the votes of all Republicans except representative Parlan Semple (who was absent).)	67.19%
Democratic	George B. Smith	41 (Note: Smith received the votes of all Democrats except senator William Young and representatives Rees Evans, John Fellenz, and James McDonald (who were absent), and representative George B. Smith, himself (who voted for William Pitt Lynde).)	32.03%
Democratic	William Pitt Lynde	1 (Note: Democratic representative George B. Smith voted for William Pitt Lynde.)	0.78%
	Absent	5	
Majority		65	50.78%
Total votes		128	96.24%
Republican hold			
