= 1869 Faroese general election =

Danish territorial election

Partial general elections were held in the Faroe Islands in 1869 to elect nine of the eighteen elected members of the Løgting. The Danish administrator (Amtmaður) and the local dean (Próstur) were also members, with the administrator serving as the speaker.

== Electoral system ==
Members of the Løgting were elected by first-past-the-post voting, with voters having as many votes as there were seats available in their constituency. Nine of the 18 seats were elected every two years. Voting was restricted to men aged 25 or over who met certain tax-paying criteria.

== Results ==
| Constituency | Elected members | Notes |
|---|---|---|
| Norðoyggjar | Niels Joensen | |
| Norðoyggjar | Hans David Matras | Re-elected |
| Sandoy | Ole Jacobsen | Re-elected |
| Sandoy | Joen P. Poulsen | |
| Suðuroy | Óli Jespersen | |
| Suðuroy | Peter Larsen | |
| Suðurstreymoy | Hannes Kristján Steingrímur Finsen | |
| Suðurstreymoy | Joen Jacobsen | Re-elected |
| Suðurstreymoy | Hans Christopher Müller | Re-elected |
Source: Løgting
