= 1871 Rhode Island gubernatorial election =

- April 7, 1871
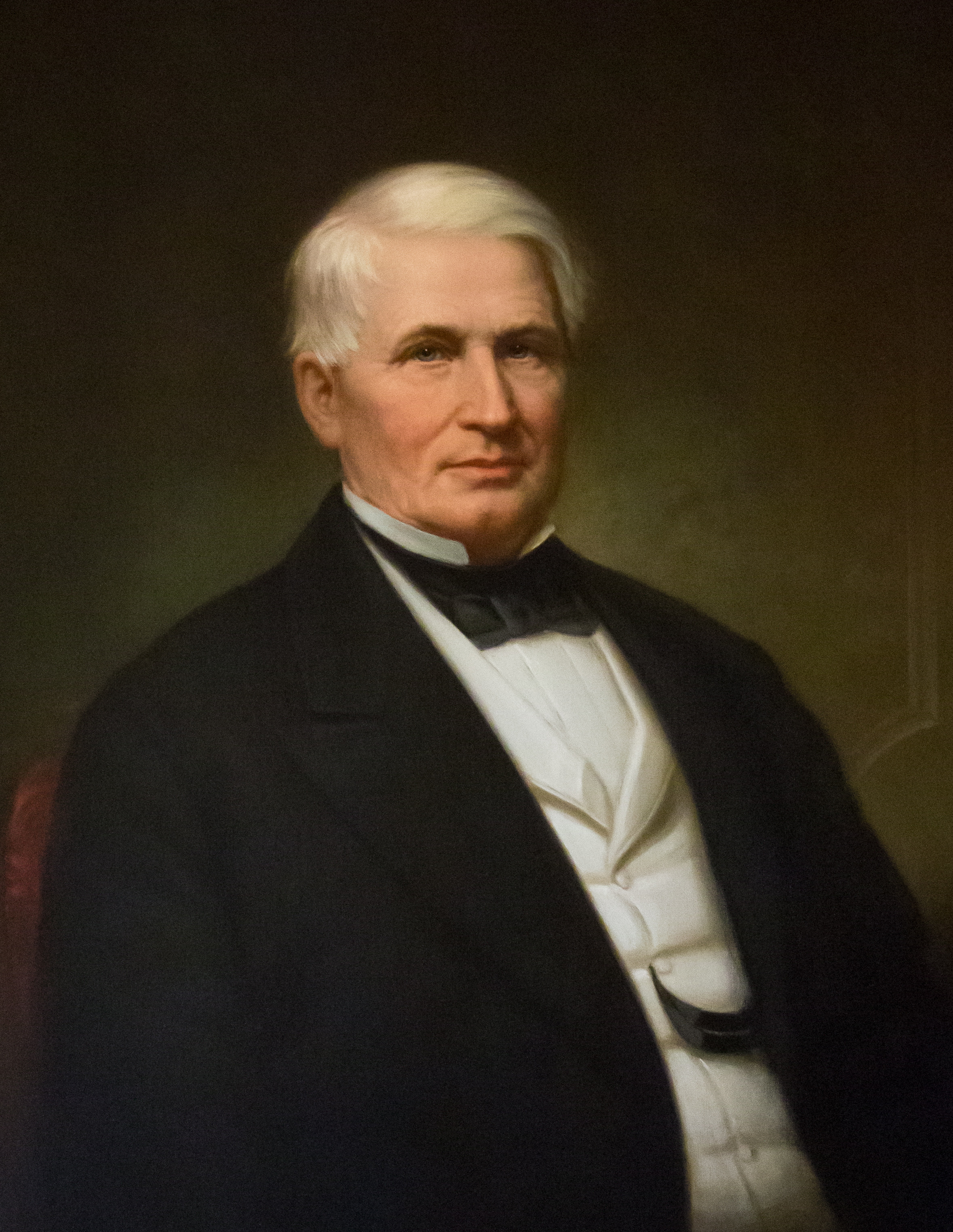
Nominee	Seth Padelford	Thomas Steere
Party	Republican	Democratic
Popular vote	8,721	5,347
Percentage	61.99%	38.01%
- County results Padelford: 50–60% 60–70% 70–80%
Governor before election
Seth Padelford
Republican
Elected Governor
Seth Padelford
Republican

The 1871 Rhode Island gubernatorial election took place on April 7, 1871, in order to elect the governor of Rhode Island. Republican candidate and incumbent governor Seth Padelford won his third one-year term as governor against Democratic candidate Thomas Steere.

== Candidates ==
=== Republican Party ===
- Seth Padelford, the Republican nominee, was the incumbent governor. He had previously served in the Rhode Island House of Representatives for two years, ran and lost in the 1860 Rhode Island gubernatorial election as the Republican nominee, and was the lieutenant governor of Rhode Island from 1863 to 1865 under James Y. Smith.

=== Democratic Party ===
- Thomas Steere was the Democratic nominee.

== Election ==
=== Statewide ===
1871 Rhode Island gubernatorial election
Party	Candidate	Votes	%
Republican	Seth Padelford	8,721	61.99
Democratic	Thomas Steere	5,347	38.01
Total votes		14,068	100.00
Republican hold			
