= 1869 Texas lieutenant gubernatorial election =

- November 30, 1869
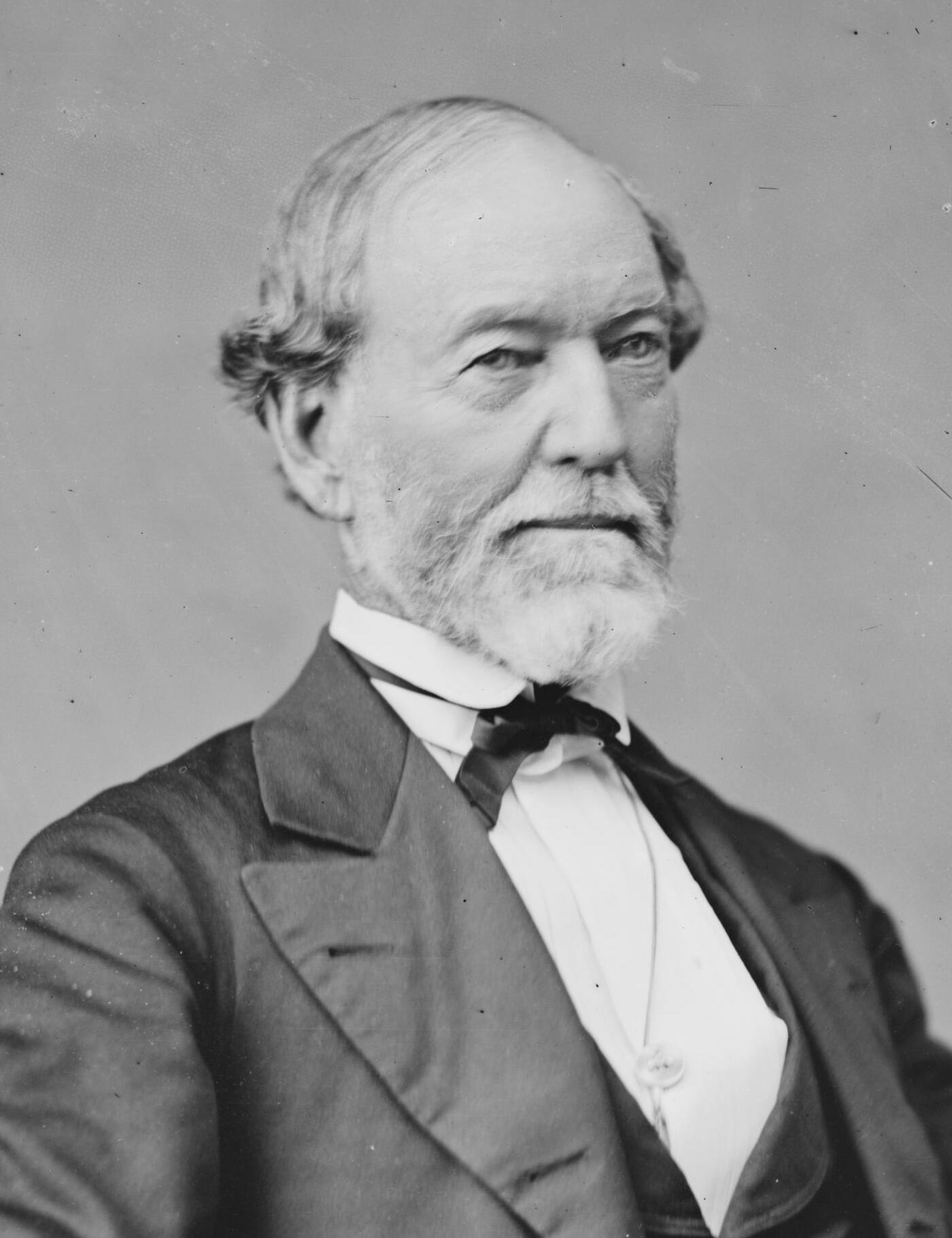

| Nominee | James W. Flanagan | Wells Thompson |
| Party | Republican | Democratic |
| Alliance | Radical Republican |
| Popular vote | 35,461 | 19,553 |
| Percentage | 49.15% | 27.10% |
| Nominee | Boulds Baker | H. R. Latimer |
| Party | Independent | Republican |
| Alliance | | Conservative Republicans |
| Popular vote | 10,327 | 6,801 |
| Percentage | 14.31% | 9.43% |
Lieutenant Governor before election
Vacant
Elected Lieutenant Governor
James W. Flanagan
Republican

The 1869 Texas lieutenant gubernatorial election was held on November 30, 1869, in order to elect the lieutenant governor of Texas. Republican candidate James W. Flanagan won a four-way race for the office winning with just under 50% of the vote. Flanagan was the first and only Republican to hold the office until Rick Perry was inaugurated in 1999.

== Background ==
Following the end of the Civil War, the federal government required that all formerly Confederate states adopt new state constitutions which abolished slavery in order to rejoin the Union. Texas wrote a constitution in 1866, but it was rejected by Congress and the state was placed under the control of a Reconstruction military district. A second constitution was drafted in 1869 which incorporated more of the reforms sought by the Radical Republicans in Congress. The new document was ratified by a vote in July 1869.

The office of lieutenant governor had been vacant since 1867, after the previous office holder, George Washington Jones, was removed from the office by General Philip Sheridan for being an "impediment to reconstruction".

== General Election ==
The election was one of the most controversial in Texas history. Favoritism by the military for the Republican party and troops stationed at the polls intimidated and probably prevented many Democrats from voting. General J. J. Reynolds ordered the drawing up of a new voter registration list, eliminating many of those who had qualified in 1867. Only about half of the registered white voters actually cast a ballot, and many polling places were either not opened, or ordered closed. Irregularities were reported but never investigated.

=== Candidates ===
- James W. Flanagan, former state senator and state representative (Radical Republican)
- Judge Henry Russell Latimer, chief justice of Lamar County (Conservative Republican)
- Dr. Boulds Baker (Independent)
- Wells Thompson, former district attorney from Matagorda County (Democrat)

=== Results ===
Texas lieutenant gubernatorial election, 1869
| Party | Candidate | Votes | % | ±% |
|---|---|---|---|---|
| Republican | James W. Flanagan | 35,461 | 49.15 | ▲34.13 |
| Democratic | Wells Thompson | 19,553 | 27.10 | ▼57.17 |
| Independent | Boulds Baker | 10,327 | 14.31 | N/A |
| Republican | H. R. Latimer | 6,801 | 9.43 | N/A |
| Total votes | | 266,514 | 100.00 | |
| Republican gain from Democratic | | | | |

== Aftermath ==
Flanagan, though he won the election, never took the oath of office to be inaugurated. He briefly presided over the Texas Senate during a provisional session of the legislature that ratified the Reconstruction Amendments to the United States Constitution as part of the state's reconstruction process. With the state readmitted to the Union, the legislature elected Flanagan to a seat in the United States Senate and he vacated the office.
