= 1871 Faroese general election =

Partial general elections were held in the Faroe Islands in 1871 to elect nine of the eighteen elected members of the Løgting. The Danish administrator (Amtmaður) and the local dean (Próstur) were also members, with the administrator serving as the speaker.

== Electoral system ==
Members of the Løgting were elected by first-past-the-post voting, with voters having as many votes as there were seats available in their constituency. Nine of the 18 seats were elected every two years. Voting was restricted to men aged 25 or over who met certain tax-paying criteria.

== Results ==
Constituency	Elected members	Notes
Eysturoy	Dánjal Jacob Danielsen	
Eysturoy	Hans Eliassen	
Eysturoy	Johannes Petersen	Re-elected
Eysturoy	Peter Christian Weihe	
Norðurstreymoy	Oliver Petræus Effersøe	
Norðurstreymoy	Johan Olsen	
Suðurstreymoy	Andreas Christian Lützen	Re-elected
Vágar	Heine Heinesen	Re-elected
Vágar	Zacharias Nielsen	Re-elected
Source: Løgting

=== By constituency ===
Norðurstreymoy
Candidate	Votes	%
Oliver Petræus Effersøe	27	39.71
Johan Olsen	16	23.53
C. L. Müller	11	16.18
Joen Heinesen	8	11.76
Thomas Egholm	4	5.88
Joen Hansen	1	1.47
Hans Jacob Jacobsen	1	1.47
Total	68	100.00
Total votes	34	–
Registered voters/turnout	170	20.00
Source: Løgting
