= July 1871 French by-elections =

The 2 July 1871 by-elections were held in France in 114 constituencies to elect seats left vacant since the general election in February 1871 because, as was permitted at the time, some deputies had been elected in several constituencies.

184 other by-elections were held between this election and the 1876 election.

== Results ==
=== Parliamentary Groups ===
Affiliation	Party	Seats
Republicans
Republicans	Moderate Republicans	38
Republicans	Radical Republicans	35
Republicans	Ralliés	26
Right
Right	Orléanists	9
Right	Bonapartists	3
Right	Legitimists	3
Total		114

== Sources ==
- Roi et President
