= Bob Young (mayor) =

American politician, journalist and author

Regional Director of the United States Department of Housing and Urban Development for the Atlanta Region
- In office June 20, 2005 – June 13, 2006
- President: George W. Bush

Mayor of Augusta-Richmond County
- In office 1999–2005
- Preceded by: Larry Sconyers
- Succeeded by: Willie Mays

Personal details
- Born: Robert Wood Young; September 3, 1947 (age 79) Pasadena, California, U.S.
- Relatives: Brigham Young
- Education: Wofford College; Augusta State University
- Occupation: Journalist; politician, writer

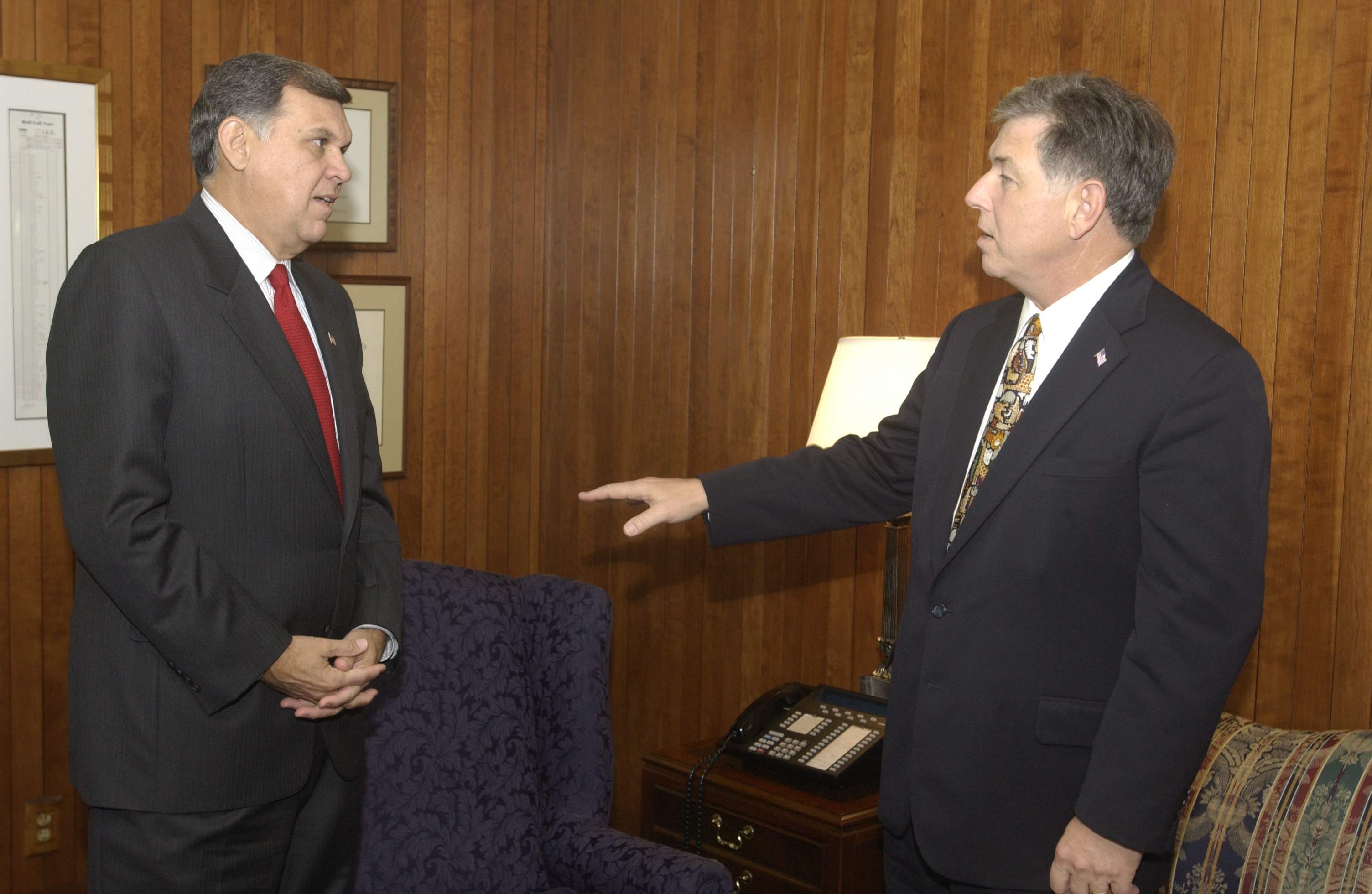
Young with Mel Martinez (left) in 2003

Robert Wood Young (born September 3, 1947) is an American broadcast journalist, author, and politician who served as Mayor of Augusta, Georgia. Young also served a presidential appointment by George W. Bush on the Advisory Council on Historic Preservation and at United States Department of Housing and Urban Development. Young later served as the President and CEO of the Southeastern Natural Sciences Academy. He is currently owner and CEO of Eagle Veterans Services and Squeaky Productions, both headquartered in Augusta.

== Early life ==
Young was born September 3, 1947, in Pasadena, California and grew up in Thomson, Georgia. He is an alumnus of Wofford College and the Augusta State University. Young is married to Gwen Fulcher Young of Augusta.

Young is a descendant of Brigham Young through his great-great-great-grandmother, Lucy Decker Young.

== Career ==
=== Journalism ===
During Young's 26-year-career in broadcast journalism, he produced two award-winning documentaries: The Great March about William Tecumseh Sherman's Civil War invasion of Georgia, and Ike's Augusta, a chronicle of Dwight Eisenhower's membership at the Augusta National Golf Club.

=== Government service ===
Young served in the United States Air Force during the Vietnam War and served as a broadcast specialist in the Armed Forces Vietnam Network as part of the Military Assistance Command Vietnam. In 1999, he became mayor of Augusta, Georgia, serving until 2005. On June 20, 2005. Young accepted a presidential appointment by George W. Bush to serve as Director of the United States Department of Housing and Urban Development for the Atlanta Region. On June 13, 2007, Young was further designated Assistant Deputy Secretary for Field Policy and Management, a position overseeing HUD Regional Directors for ten regions across the nation. Previously, he was appointed to represent the nation's mayors on the Advisory Council on Historic Preservation.

=== Writing career ===
In 2009, Young began writing what would become his first novel, The Treasure Train; a historical novel set in Augusta around the end of the Civil War. The book follows the account of the midnight raid at Chennault, Georgia, and the stolen shipment of confederate gold; delving into the derivative tales and folklore it spawned. Young credited Dr. Mark Waters for giving him the historical basis in fact for the storyline his fiction would closely follow. In 2017 Young published his second historical novel The Hand of the Wicked, based on the events surrounding the murder of freed woman Nellie West during Georgia Reconstruction.
