= Benjamin F. Conley =

American politician (1815–1886)

Benjamin Conley
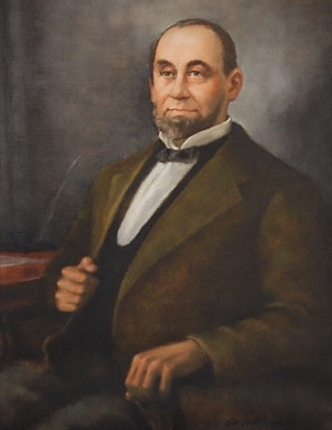

47th Governor of Georgia
- In office October 30, 1871 – January 12, 1872
- Preceded by: Rufus Bullock
- Succeeded by: James M. Smith

Mayor of Augusta, Georgia
- In office 1857–1859
- Preceded by: George W. Evans
- Succeeded by: Foster Blodgett Jr.

Personal details
- Born: March 1, 1815 Newark, New Jersey, U.S.
- Died: January 10, 1886 (aged 70) West End, Georgia, U.S. (now Atlanta, Georgia)
- Party: Republican

Benjamin F. Conley (March 1, 1815 – January 10, 1886) was an American politician from the state of Georgia, who served as the 47th governor of Georgia from October 30, 1871, to January 12, 1872. He also previously served as the mayor of Augusta from 1857 to 1859.

== Biography ==
Conley was born in Newark, New Jersey, in 1815 and moved to Savannah, Georgia, in his youth. He died in 1886 in Atlanta in an area known at the time as West End. Conley was buried at Augusta's Magnolia Cemetery.

== Political career ==
Conley's previous political service included the office of mayor of Augusta, Georgia, from 1857 to 1859. Conley served as the 47th governor of Georgia from October 30, 1871, to January 12, 1872, during Reconstruction and was the second Republican governor of Georgia. Conley was serving as the president of the Georgia Senate when his predecessor, Rufus B. Bullock, was forced to resign. Under the Constitution of Georgia in effect at that time, as the Senate president, Conley assumed the governorship and served for only two months. Conley was the last Republican to serve as governor of Georgia until 2003, when Sonny Perdue became governor of Georgia.

Political offices
Preceded by Rufus Bullock	Governor of Georgia; October 30, 1871 – January 12, 1872	Succeeded by James Milton Smith
