= James Milton Smith =

American politician (1823–1890)

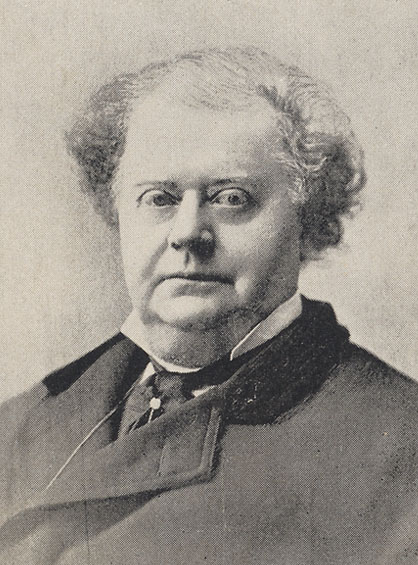

48th Governor of Georgia
- In office January 12, 1872 – January 12, 1877
- Preceded by: Benjamin F. Conley
- Succeeded by: Alfred H. Colquitt

Speaker of the Georgia House of Representatives
- In office 1871–1871
- Preceded by: Robert McWhorter
- Succeeded by: Joseph B. Cumming

Member of the Confederate States House of Representatives from Georgia's 7th district
- In office May 2, 1864 – March 18, 1865
- Preceded by: Robert Pleasant Trippe
- Succeeded by: Office abolished

Personal details
- Born: October 24, 1823 Twiggs County, Georgia, U.S.
- Died: November 25, 1890 (aged 67) Columbus, Georgia, U.S.
- Party: Democratic
- Spouses: Sally Marshall Welborn; Hester Ann Brown

Military service
- Allegiance: Confederate States
- Branch/service: Confederate States Army
- Years of service: 1861‍–‍1864
- Rank: Colonel
- Unit: 13th Georgia Infantry
- Battles/wars: American Civil War; Battle of Gettysburg; Battle of Cold Harbor

James Milton Smith (October 24, 1823 – November 25, 1890) was a Confederate infantry colonel in the American Civil War, as well as a post-war governor of Georgia.

== Early life ==
Smith was born in Twiggs County, Georgia and was educated at the Culloden Academy in Monroe County. He was admitted to the bar in 1846 and opened his first office in Columbus, Georgia. In 1855, he unsuccessfully ran for U.S. Representative from his district.

== Civil War ==
With the onset of the Civil War, he entered the Confederate Army as a captain in the 13th Georgia Infantry Regiment. He was promoted to major, then to the regiment's colonelcy in 1862. He led his regiment through the Gettysburg campaign, and marched to the banks of the Susquehanna River before returning to Gettysburg to participate in the Battle of Gettysburg. He was severely wounded in the 1864 Battle of Cold Harbor and returned to Georgia to recuperate.

== Political life ==
Smith resigned from the army to enter politics and was elected a Democratic delegate to the Confederate Congress until hostilities ceased in 1865. He established a very successful law partnership in Columbus, Georgia, and was elected to the Georgia Legislature in 1870 as an outspoken opponent of Radical Reconstruction. The following year, he became Speaker of the Georgia House of Representatives.

Running unopposed, Smith was elected Governor in 1872, succeeding acting Governor Benjamin F. Conley. To many, Smith's inauguration on January 12, 1872, symbolized the end of Reconstruction and the "redemption" of the Democratic Party in Georgia. Smith was reelected in 1874, serving until 1877. During his second term, he was a delegate to the Democratic National Convention of 1876.

Major accomplishments included restoring the state's credit rating by voiding fraudulent bonds and reducing overall expenditures, retiring the debt and leaving office with a surplus in the state treasury. He was a supporter of creating a state department of agriculture, and was noted for appointing the most qualified candidates to fill openings in his administration, a contrast to the patronage system that was popular at the time.

In an 1876 interview with the Atlanta Journal Constitution, Smith made racist remarks about African-Americans, calling them "idle, thriftless" and "always depending on the whites for everything". The Equal Justice Initiative, a non-profit organization based in Montgomery, Alabama, noted posthumously (in 2017) that African-Americans made up 46 percent of his constituents.

Smith was defeated in his bid for the U.S. Senate in 1877. He was named the first chairman of the new Georgia Railroad Commission, serving a 6-year term. Returning to his legal career, his former Civil War commander, John B. Gordon appointed him as Judge of the Chattahoochee Circuit of the Superior Court from 1888 until 1890.

== Personal life, death and legacy ==
Smith was married twice, first to Sally Marshall Welborn, then after her death to Hester Ann R. Brown.

Smith died on November 25, 1890. He was buried in Alta Vista Cemetery in Gainesville, Georgia. The Atlanta Constitution eulogized James Milton Smith as "one of the boldest and most fearless men in the history of Georgia".

The James M. Smith Science Hall at the State Normal School in Athens was named for him.

== See also ==
- List of speakers of the Georgia House of Representatives

Party political offices
Preceded by John Brown Gordon	Democratic nominee for Governor of Georgia; 1871, 1872	Succeeded by Alfred H. Colquitt
Political offices
Preceded by Benjamin F. Conley	Governor of Georgia; 1872–1877	Succeeded by Alfred H. Colquitt
Confederate States House of Representatives
Preceded by Robert Pleasant Trippe	C.S.A. Representative from Georgia's 7th Congressional District; 1863–1865	Succeeded by none
