= 1871 French legislative election =

- 8 February 1871

All 758 seats in the National Assembly 320 seats needed for a majority
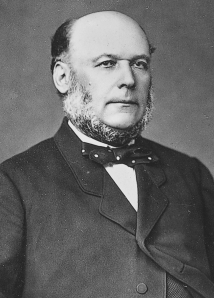

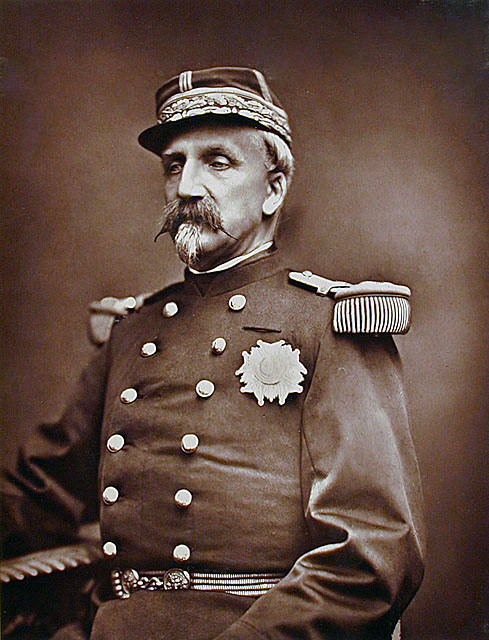

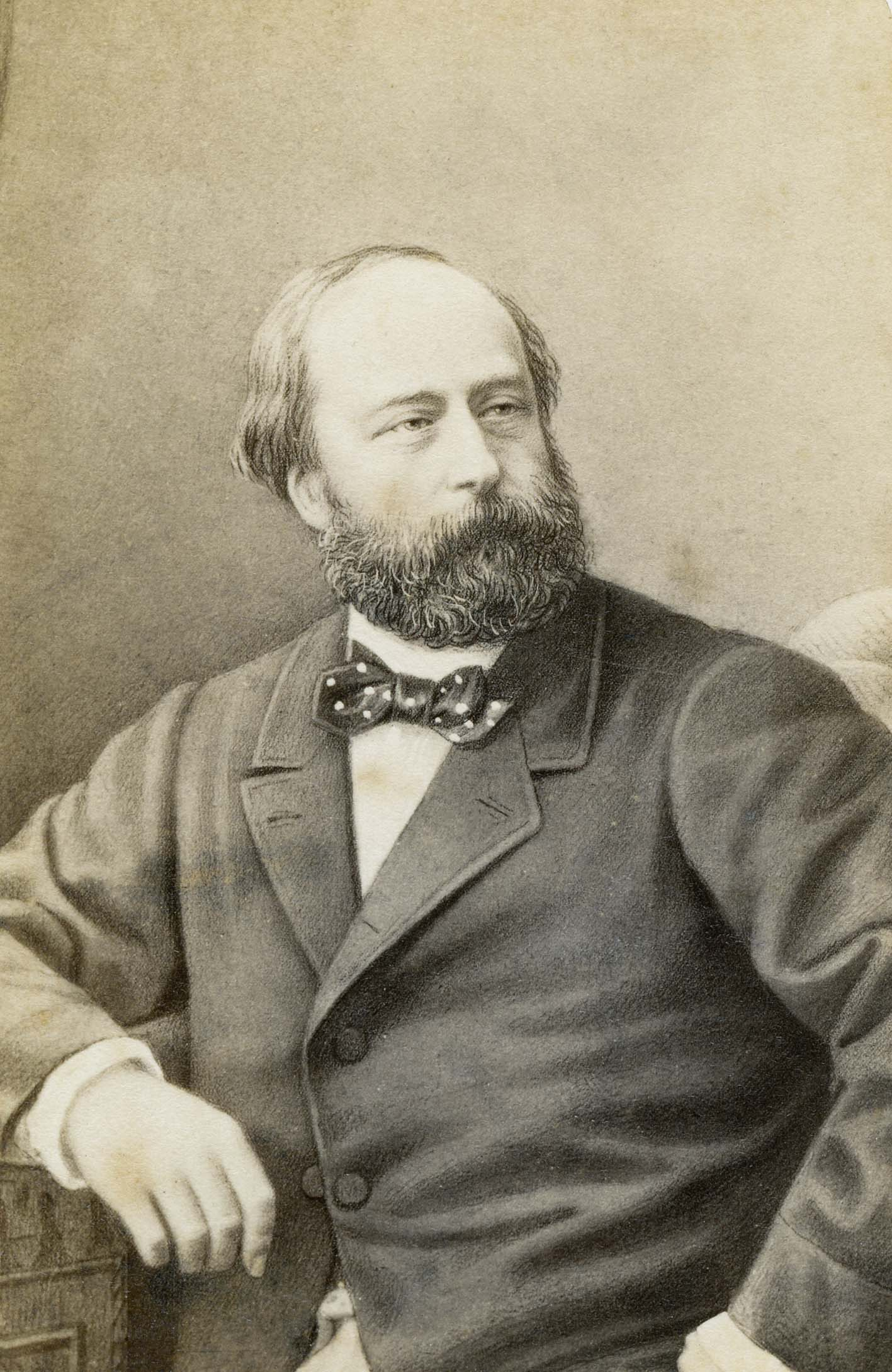
	First party	Second party	Third party
Leader	Jules Grévy	Henri d'Orléans	Henri of Artois
Party	Republican Left	Orléanists	Legitimists
Seats won	249	223	185
	Fourth party	Fifth party
Party	Republican Union	Bonapartists
Seats won	78	23
Prime Minister before election
Louis-Jules Trochu
Independent
Elected Prime Minister
Jules Dufaure
Independent

Legislative elections were held in France on 8 February 1871 to elect the first legislature of the Third French Republic, the unicameral National Assembly. The elections were held during a situation of crisis in the country, as following the Franco-Prussian War, 43 departments were occupied by Prussian forces. As a result, all public meetings were outlawed and Paris was the only city where an election campaign took place.

The electoral law allowed candidates to run in more than one seat at a time. As a result, several candidates were elected in more than one seat, with Adolphe Thiers elected in 86 constituencies. By-elections were subsequently held on 2 July to elect representatives for the 114 vacant seats.

The elections saw the victory of monarchists (Legitimists and Orleanists), who were favourable to a restoration of the monarchy and peace with the German Empire, with the two groups winning a large majority.

== Results ==
Graph of the party split among 758 seats.
Party	Seats		
Party	Won	By-election	Total
Republican Left	150	99	249
Orléanists	214	9	223
Legitimists	182	3	185
Republican Union	78	0	78
Bonapartists	20	3	23
Total	644	114	758
Source: Rois et Presidents

== See also ==
- 1871 French legislative election in Algeria
