= 1869 Rhode Island gubernatorial election =

- April 7, 1869
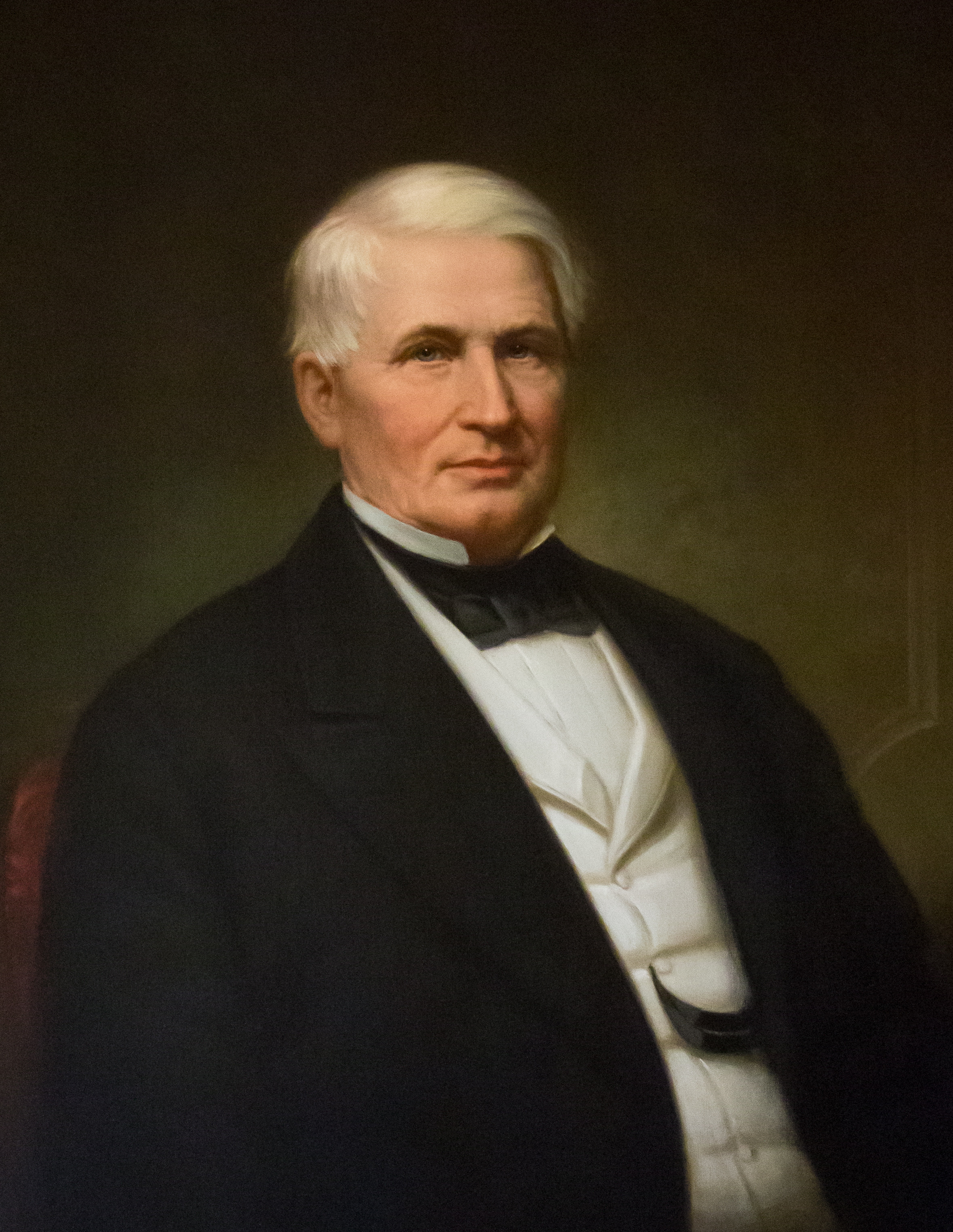
| Nominee | Seth Padelford | Lyman Pierce |
| Party | Republican | Democratic |
| Popular vote | 7,359 | 3,390 |
| Percentage | 68.46% | 31.54% |
- County results Padelford: 60–70% 70–80% 80–90%
Governor before election
Ambrose Burnside
Republican
Elected Governor
Seth Padelford
Republican

The 1869 Rhode Island gubernatorial election took place on April 7, 1869, in order to elect the governor of Rhode Island. Republican candidate and incumbent governor Seth Padelford won his first one-year term as governor against Democratic candidate Lyman Pierce.

== Candidates ==
=== Republican Party ===
- Seth Padelford, the Republican nominee had previously served in the Rhode Island House of Representatives for two years, ran and lost in the 1860 Rhode Island gubernatorial election as the Republican nominee, and was the lieutenant governor of Rhode Island from 1863 to 1865 under Governor James Y. Smith.

=== Democratic Party ===
- Lyman Pierce was the Democratic nominee.

== Election ==
=== Statewide ===
1869 Rhode Island gubernatorial election
| Party | Candidate | Votes | % |
|---|---|---|---|
| Republican | Seth Padelford | 7,359 | 68.46 |
| Democratic | Lyman Pierce | 3,390 | 31.54 |
| Total votes | | 10,749 | 100.00 |
| Republican hold | | | |
