= France in the long nineteenth century =

History of France from 1789 to 1914

In the history of France, the period from 1789 to 1914, dubbed the "long 19th century" by the historian Eric Hobsbawm, extends from the French Revolution to the brink of World War I.

Throughout this period, France underwent significant transformations that reshaped its geography, demographics, language, and economic landscape, marking a period of profound change and development. The French Revolution and Napoleonic eras fundamentally altered French society, promoting centralization, administrative uniformity across departments, and a standardized legal code. Education also centralized, emphasizing technical training and meritocracy, despite growing conservatism among the aristocracy and the church. Wealth concentration saw the richest 10 percent owning most of the nation's wealth. The 19th century saw France expanding to nearly its modern territorial limits through annexations and overseas imperialism, notably in Algeria, Indochina, and Africa. Despite territorial gains, France faced challenges, including slow population growth, compared to its European neighbors, and a late industrialization that saw a shift from rural to urban living and the rise of an industrial workforce. The loss of Alsace and Lorraine to Germany in the Franco-Prussian War further fueled nationalistic sentiments and set the stage for future conflicts.

The period was also marked by significant linguistic and educational reforms, which sought to unify the country through language and secular education, contributing to a stronger national identity. Economically, France struggled to match the industrial growth rates of other advanced nations, maintaining a more traditional economy longer than its counterparts. Politically, the century was characterized by the end of the ancien régime, the rise and fall of the First and Second Empires, the tumultuous establishment of the Third Republic, and the radical experiment of the Paris Commune, reflecting the ongoing struggle between revolutionary ideals and conservative restoration. The Third Republic embarked on modernizing France, with educational reforms and attempts to create a unified national identity. Foreign policy focused on isolation of Germany and forming alliances, leading to the Triple Entente. Domestically, issues like the Dreyfus affair highlighted the nation's divisions, while laws aimed at reducing the Catholic Church's influence sparked further controversy.

Cultural and artistic movements, from Romanticism to Modernism, mirrored these societal changes, contributing to France's rich cultural legacy. The Belle Époque emerged as a period of cultural flourishing and peace, overshadowed by the growing threats of war and internal discord. The long 19th century set the foundations for modern France, navigating through revolutions, wars, and social upheavals to emerge as a unified nation-state near the front of the global stage, by the early 20th century.

== General aspects ==
=== Geography ===
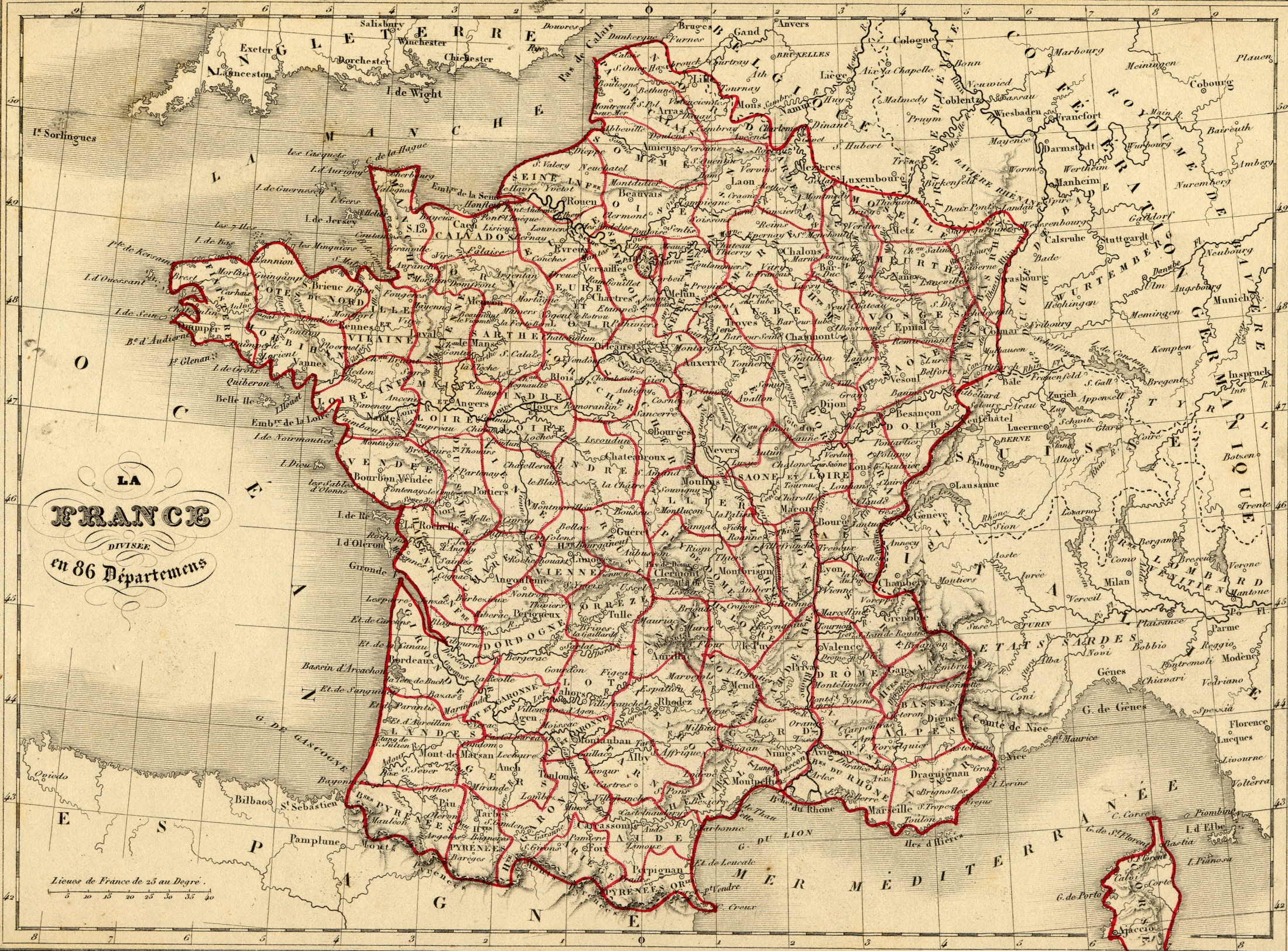
A map of France in 1843 under the July Monarchy

By the French Revolution, the Kingdom of France had expanded to nearly the modern territorial limits. The 19th century would complete the process by the annexation of the Duchy of Savoy and the County of Nice (first during the First Empire, and then definitively in 1860) and some small papal (like Avignon) and foreign possessions. France's territorial limits were greatly extended during the Empire through Revolutionary and Napoleonic military conquests and re-organization of Europe, but these were reversed by the Vienna Congress. Savoy and Nice were definitively annexed following France's victory in the Franco-Austrian War in 1859.

In 1830, France invaded Algeria, and in 1848 this north African country was fully integrated into France as a department. The late 19th century saw France embark on a massive program of overseas imperialism – including French Indochina (modern day Cambodia, Vietnam and Laos) and Africa (the Scramble for Africa brought France most of North-West and Central Africa) – which brought it in direct competition with British interests.

With the French defeat in the Franco-Prussian War of 1870, France lost Alsace and portions of Lorraine to Germany (see Alsace-Lorraine); these lost provinces were not regained until the end of World War I.

=== Demographics ===
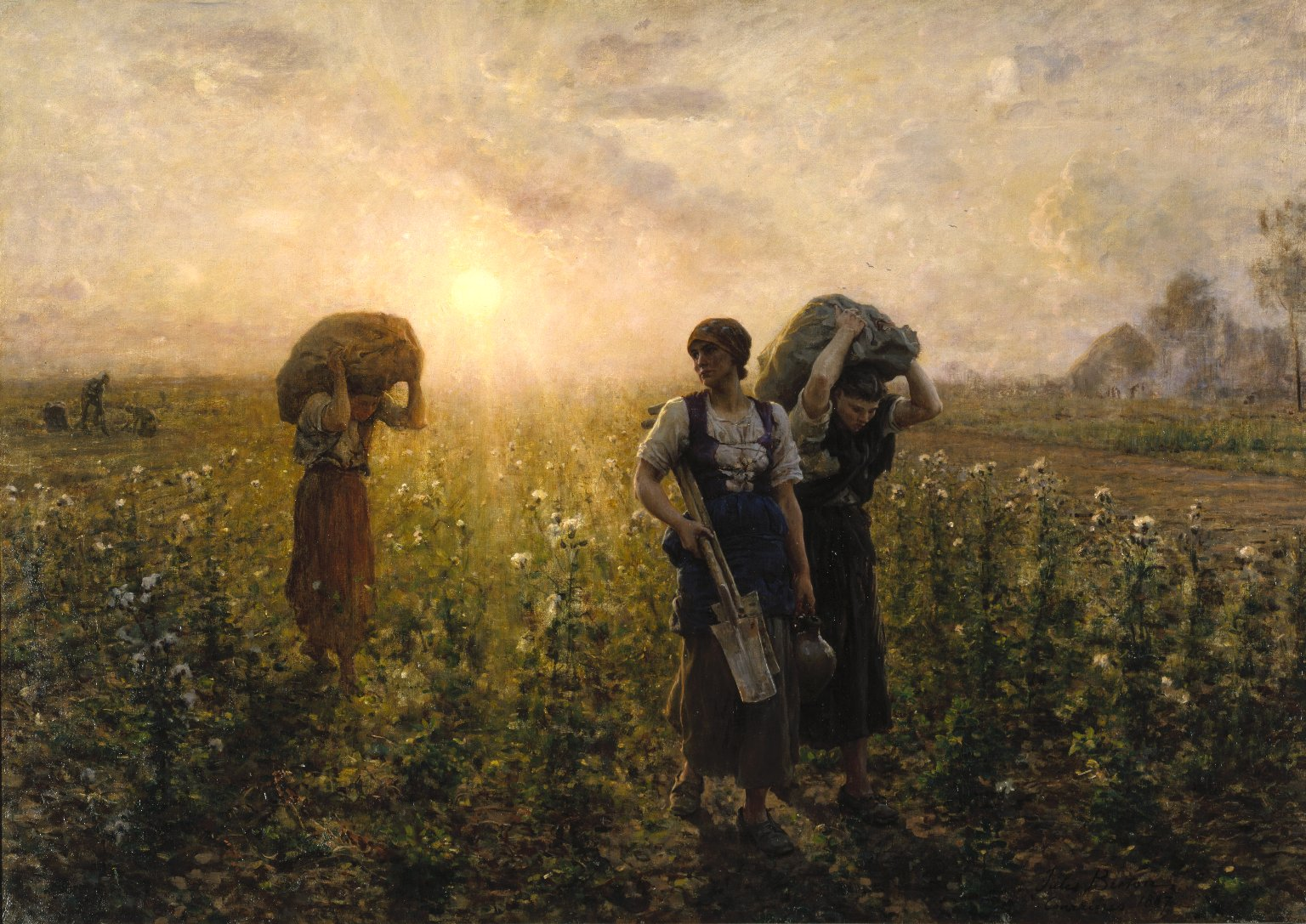
French peasants depicted in Fin du travail (1887)

Between 1795 and 1866, metropolitan France (that is, without overseas or colonial possessions) was the second most populous country of Europe, behind Russia, and the fourth most populous country in the world (behind China, India, and Russia); between 1866 and 1911, metropolitan France was the third most populous country of Europe, behind Russia and Germany. Unlike other European countries, France did not experience a strong population growth from the middle of the 19th century to the first half of the 20th century. The French population in 1789 is estimated at 28 million; by 1850, it was 36 million and in 1880 it was around 39 million. Slow growth was a major political issue, as arch-rival Germany continued to gain an advantage in terms of population and industry. Ways to reverse the trend became a major political issue.

Until 1850, population growth was mainly in the countryside, but a period of slow urbanization began under the Second Empire. Unlike in England, industrialization was a late phenomenon in France. France's economy in the 1830s had a limited iron industry, under-developed coal supplies, and the great majority lived on farms. The systematic establishment of primary education and the creation of new engineering schools prepared an industrial expansion which would blossom in the following decades. French rail transport only began hesitantly in the 1830s, and would not truly develop until the 1840s, using imported British engineers. By the revolution of 1848, a growing industrial workforce began to participate actively in French politics, but their hopes were largely betrayed by the policies of the Second Empire. The loss of the important coal, steel and glass production regions of Alsace and Lorraine would cause further problems. The industrial worker population increased from 23% in 1870 to 39% in 1914. Nevertheless, France remained a rather rural country in the early 1900s with 40% of the population still farmers in 1914. While exhibiting a similar urbanization rate to the U.S. (50% of the population in the U.S. was engaged in agriculture in the early 1900s), the urbanization rate of France was still well behind that of the UK (80% urbanization rate in the early 1900s).

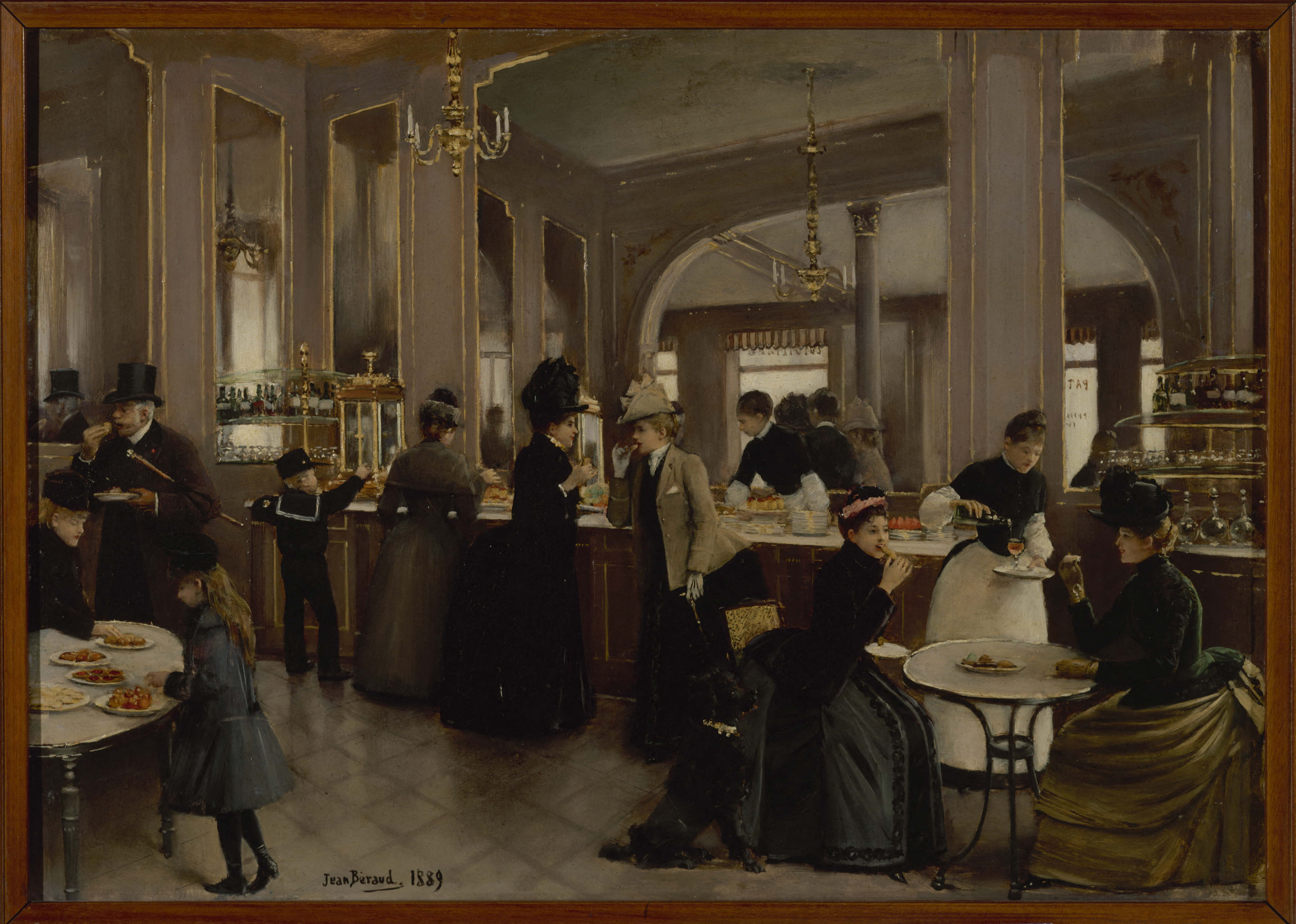
Wealthy Parisians in an urban café or patisserie, 1889

In the 19th century, France was a country of immigration for peoples and political refugees from Eastern Europe (Germany, Poland, Hungary, Russia, Ashkenazi Jews) and from the Mediterranean (Italy, Spanish Sephardic Jews and North-African Mizrahi Jews). Large numbers of Belgian migrant workers laboured in French factories, particularly in the textile industry in the Nord.

France was the first country in Europe to emancipate its Jewish population during the French Revolution. The Crémieux Decree of 1870 gave full citizenship for the Jews in French Algeria. By 1872, there were an estimated 86,000 Jews living in France (by 1945 this would increase to 300,000), many of whom integrated (or attempted to integrate) into French society, although the Dreyfus affair would reveal antisemitism in certain classes of French society (see History of the Jews in France).

Alsace and Lorraine were lost to Germany in 1871. Some French refugees moved to France. France suffered massive losses during World War I — roughly estimated at 1.4 million French dead including civilians (see World War I casualties) (or nearly 10% of the active adult male population) and four times as many wounded (see World War I § Aftermath).

=== Language ===
Linguistically, France was a patchwork. People in the countryside spoke various languages. France would only become a linguistically unified country by the end of the 19th century, and in particular through the educational policies of Jules Ferry during the French Third Republic. From an illiteracy rate of 33% among peasants in 1870, by 1914 almost all French could read and understand the national language, although 50% still understood or spoke a regional language of France (in today's France, only an estimated 10% still understand a regional language).

Through the educational, social and military policies of the Third Republic, by 1914 the French had been converted (as the historian Eugen Weber has put it) from a "country of peasants into a nation of Frenchmen". By 1914, most French could read French and the use of regional languages had greatly decreased; the role of the Catholic Church in public life had been radically diminished; a sense of national identity and pride was actively taught. The anti-clericalism of the Third Republic profoundly changed French religious habits: in one case study for the city of Limoges comparing the years 1899 with 1914, it was found that baptisms decreased from 98% to 60%, and civil marriages before a town official increased from 14% to 60%.

=== Economic laggard: 1815–1913 ===
French economic history since its late 18th century Revolution was tied to three major events and trends: the Napoleonic Era, the competition with Britain and its other neighbors in regards to 'industrialization', and the 'total wars' of the late 19th and early 20th centuries. Quantitative analysis of output data shows the French per capita growth rates were slightly smaller than Britain. However the British population tripled in size, while France grew by only third – so the overall British economy grew much faster. François Crouzet has summarized the cycles of French per capita economic growth in 1815–1913 as:

- 1815–1840: irregular, but sometimes fast growth;
- 1840–1860: fast growth;
- 1860–1882: slowing down;
- 1882–1896: stagnation; and
- 1896–1913: fast growth.

For the 1870–1913 era, Angus Maddison gives growth rates for 12 Western advanced countries – 10 in Europe plus the United States and Canada. In terms of per capita growth, France was about average. However again its population growth was very slow, so as far as the growth rate in total size of the economy France was in next to the last place, just ahead of Italy. The 12 countries averaged 2.7% growth per year in total output, but France only averaged 1.6% growth. Crouzet concludes that the

average size of industrial undertakings was smaller in France than in other advanced countries; that machinery was generally less up to date, productivity lower, costs higher. The domestic system and handicraft production long persisted, while big modern factories were for long exceptional. Large lumps of the Ancien Régime economy survived. ... On the whole, the qualitative lag between the British and French economy ... persisted during the whole period under consideration, and later on a similar lag developed between France and some other countries—Belgium, Germany, the United States. France did not succeed in catching up with Britain, but was overtaken by several of her rivals.

== French Revolution (1789–1792) ==
=== End of the Ancien Régime (to 1789) ===
Storming of the Bastille in 1789

The reign of Louis XVI (1774–1792) had seen a temporary revival of French fortunes, but the over-ambitious projects and military campaigns of the 18th century had produced chronic financial problems. Deteriorating economic conditions, popular resentment against the complicated system of privileges granted the nobility and clerics, and a lack of alternate avenues for change were among the principal causes for convoking the Estates-General which convened in Versailles in 1789. On May 28, 1789, the Abbé Sieyès moved that the Third Estate proceed with verification of its own powers and invite the other two estates to take part, but not to wait for them. They proceeded to do so, and then voted a measure far more radical, declaring themselves the National Assembly, an assembly not of the Estates but of "the People".

Louis XVI shut the Salle des États where the Assembly met. The Assembly moved their deliberations to the king's tennis court, where they proceeded to swear the Tennis Court Oath (June 20, 1789), under which they agreed not to separate until they had given France a constitution. A majority of the representatives of the clergy soon joined them, as did 47 members of the nobility. By June 27 the royal party had overtly given in, although the military began to arrive in large numbers around Paris and Versailles. On July 9 the Assembly reconstituted itself as the National Constituent Assembly.

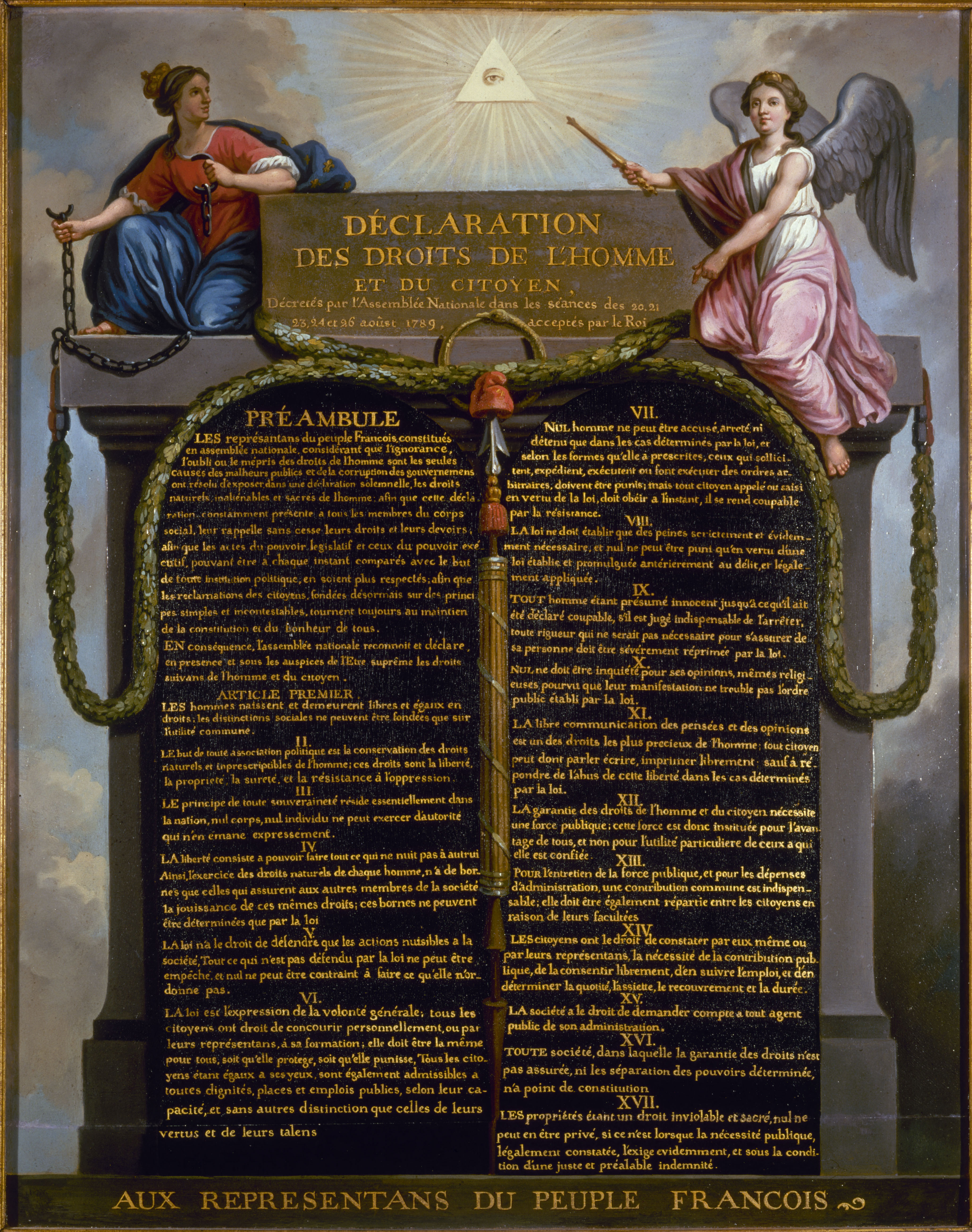
The Declaration of the Rights of Man and of the Citizen of 1789

On July 11, 1789, King Louis, acting under the influence of the conservative nobles, as well as his wife, Marie Antoinette, and brother, the Comte d'Artois, banished the reformist minister Jacques Necker and completely reconstructed the ministry. Much of Paris, presuming this to be the start of a royal coup, moved into open rebellion. Some of the military joined the mob; others remained neutral. On July 14, 1789, after four hours of combat, the insurgents seized the Bastille fortress, killing its governor and several of his guards. The king and his military supporters backed down, at least for a short time.

After this violence, nobles started to flee the country as émigrés, some of whom began plotting civil war within the kingdom and agitating for a European coalition against France. Insurrection and the spirit of popular sovereignty spread throughout France. In rural areas, many went beyond this: some burned title-deeds and no small number of châteaux, as part of a general agrarian insurrection known as "la Grande Peur" (the Great Fear).

=== Constitutional monarchy (1789–1792) ===
On August 4, 1789, the National Assembly abolished feudalism, sweeping away both the seigneurial rights of the Second Estate and the tithes gathered by the First Estate. In the course of a few hours, nobles, clergy, towns, provinces, companies, and cities lost their special privileges. The revolution also brought about a massive shifting of powers from the Catholic Church to the State. Legislation enacted in 1790 abolished the Church's authority to levy a tax on crops known as the dîme, cancelled special privileges for the clergy, and confiscated Church property: under the ancien régime, the Church had been the largest landowner in the country. Further legislation abolished monastic vows. The Civil Constitution of the Clergy, passed on July 12, 1790, turned the remaining clergy into employees of the State and required that they take an oath of loyalty to the constitution. The Civil Constitution of the Clergy also made the Catholic Church an arm of the secular state.

Looking to the United States Declaration of Independence for a model, on August 26, 1789, the Assembly published the Declaration of the Rights of Man and of the Citizen. Like the U.S. Declaration, it comprised a statement of principles rather than a constitution with legal effect. The Assembly replaced the historic provinces with eighty-three départements, uniformly administered and approximately equal to one another in extent and population; it also abolished the symbolic paraphernalia of the ancien régime — armorial bearings, liveries, etc. — which further alienated the more conservative nobles, and added to the ranks of the émigrés.

Louis XVI opposed the course of the revolution and on the night of June 20, 1791 the royal family fled the Tuileries. However, the king was recognised at Varennes in the Meuse late on June 21 and he and his family were brought back to Paris under guard. With most of the Assembly still favouring a constitutional monarchy rather than a republic, the various groupings reached a compromise which left Louis XVI little more than a figurehead: he had perforce to swear an oath to the constitution, and a decree declared that retracting the oath, heading an army for the purpose of making war upon the nation, or permitting anyone to do so in his name would amount to de facto abdication.

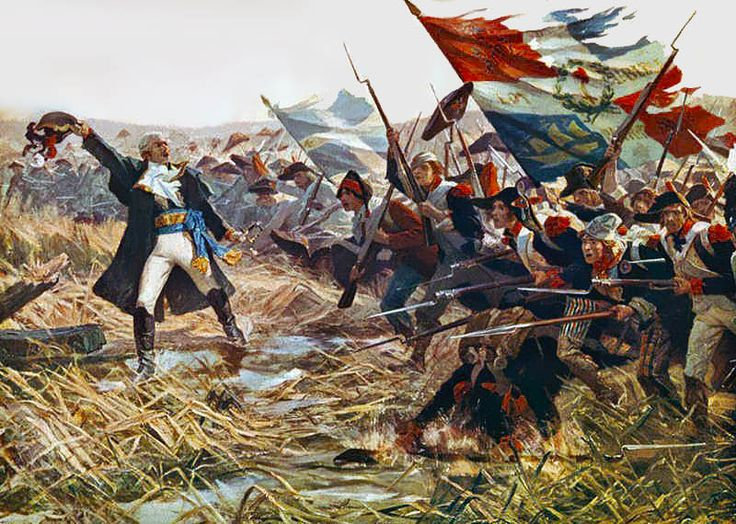
The French Revolutionary Army at the battle of Jemappes (1792) during the French Revolutionary Wars

Meanwhile, a renewed threat from abroad arose: Leopold II, Holy Roman Emperor, Frederick William II of Prussia, and the king's brother Charles-Phillipe, comte d'Artois issued the Declaration of Pillnitz which considered the cause of Louis XVI as their own, demanded his total liberty and the dissolution of the Assembly, and promised an invasion of France on his behalf if the revolutionary authorities refused its conditions. The politics of the period inevitably drove France towards war with Austria and its allies. France declared war on Austria (April 20, 1792) and Prussia joined on the Austrian side a few weeks later. The French Revolutionary Wars had begun.

== First Republic (1792–1799) ==
The execution of Louis XVI in 1793

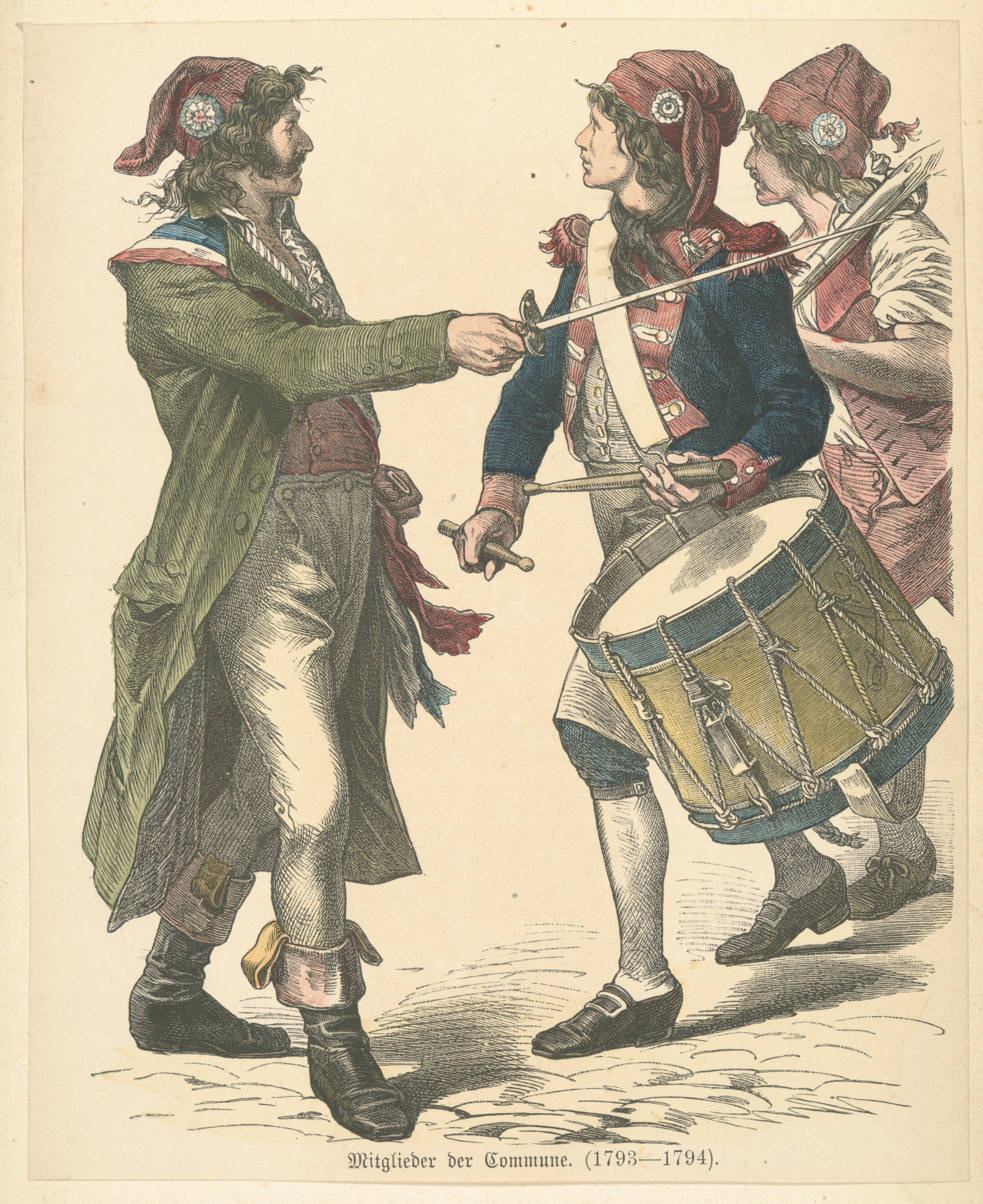
Sans-culotte (left), compare figures wearing culottes (right).

In the Brunswick Manifesto, the Imperial and Prussian armies threatened retaliation on the French population should it resist their advance or the reinstatement of the monarchy. As a consequence, King Louis was seen as conspiring with the enemies of France. He was arrested on August 10, 1792. On September 20, French revolutionary troops won their first great victory at the battle of Valmy. The First Republic was proclaimed the following day. By the end of the year, the French had overrun the Austrian Netherlands, threatening the Dutch Republic to the north, and had also penetrated east of the Rhine, briefly occupying the imperial city of Frankfurt am Main. January 17, 1793 saw the king condemned to death for "conspiracy against the public liberty and the general safety" by a weak majority in Convention. On January 21, he was beheaded. Shortly afterwards, France declared war on Great Britain and the Dutch Republic.

=== Reign of Terror (1793–1794) ===
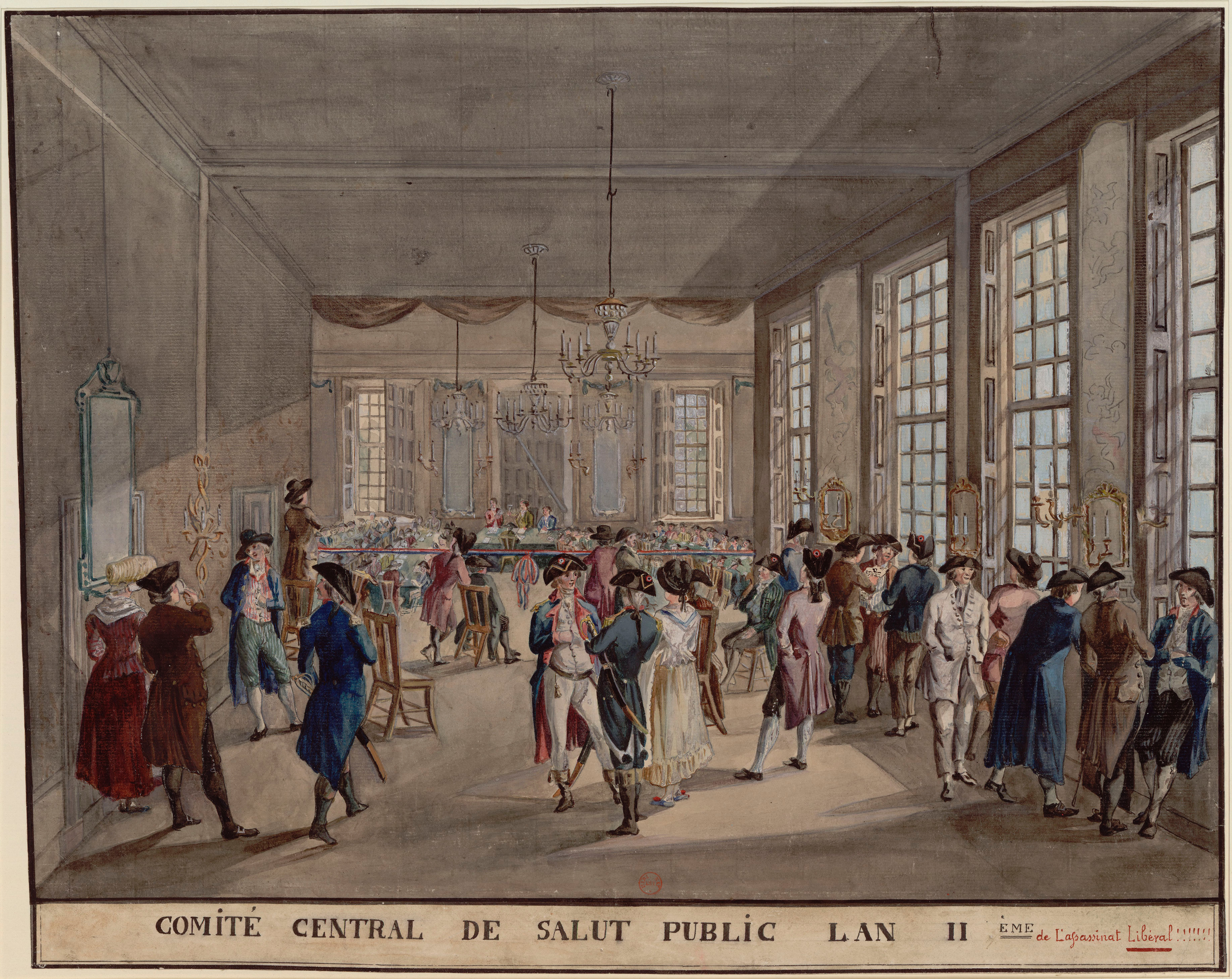
Comité Central de Salut public, An II (Committee of Public Safety, year II)

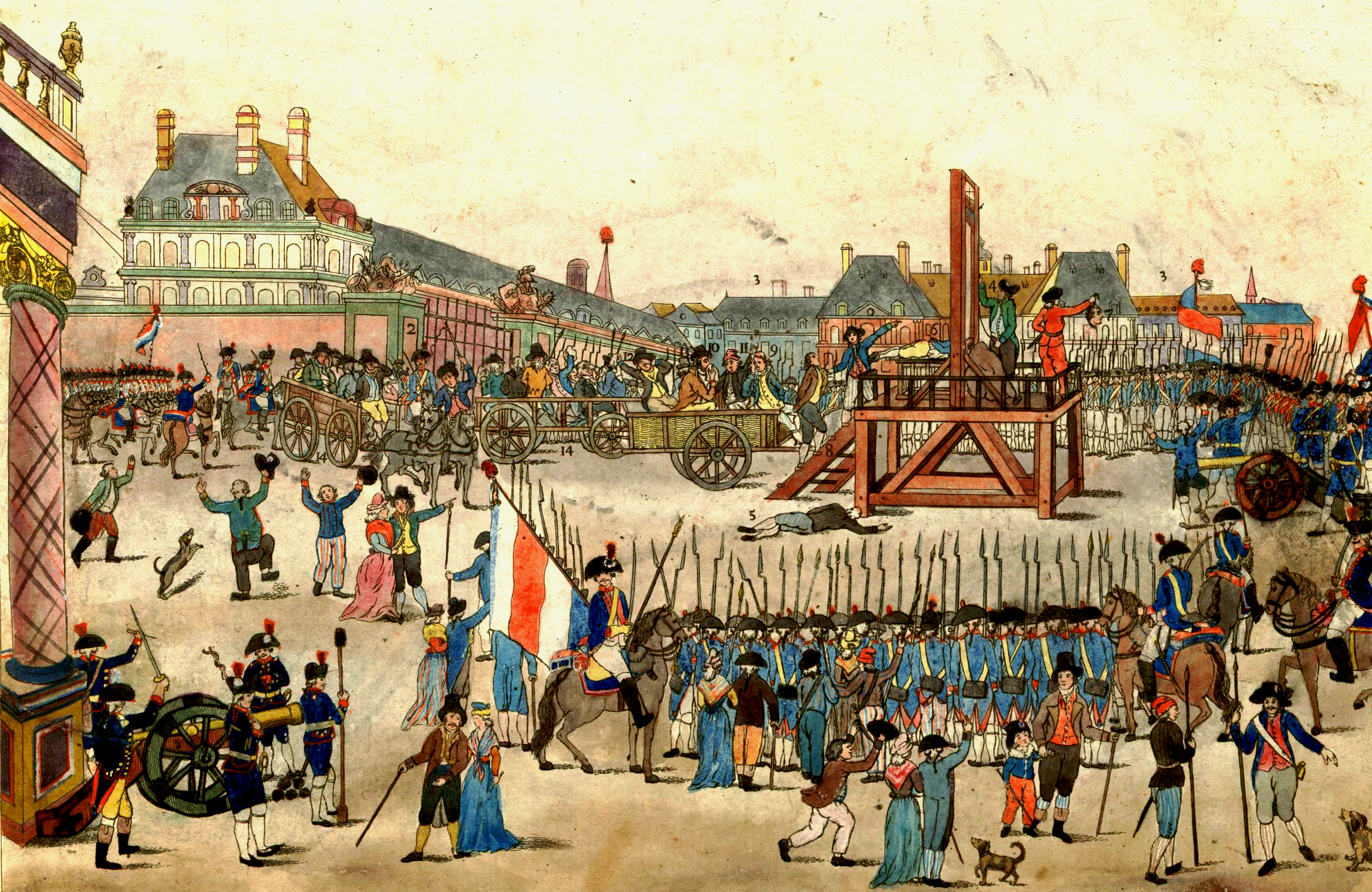
The execution of Robespierre marked the end of the Reign of Terror

The first half of 1793 went badly for the new French Republic, with the French armies being driven out of Germany and the Austrian Netherlands. In this situation, prices rose and the sans-culottes (poor labourers and radical Jacobins) rioted; counter-revolutionary activities began in some regions. This encouraged the Jacobins to seize power through a parliamentary coup, backed up by force effected by mobilising public support against the Girondist faction, and by utilising the mob power of the Parisian sans-culottes. An alliance of Jacobin and sans-culottes elements thus became the effective centre of the new government. Policy became considerably more radical. The government instituted the "levy-en-masse", where all able-bodied men 18 and older were liable for military service. This allowed France to field much larger armies than its enemies, and soon the tide of war was reversed.

The Committee of Public Safety came under the control of Maximilien Robespierre, and the Jacobins unleashed the Reign of Terror. At least 1200 people met their deaths under the guillotine — or otherwise — after accusations of counter-revolutionary activities. In October, the queen was beheaded, further antagonizing Austria. In 1794 Robespierre had ultra-radicals and moderate Jacobins executed; in consequence, however, his own popular support eroded markedly. Georges Danton was beheaded for arguing that there were too many beheadings. There were attempts to do away with organized religion in France entirely and replace it with a Festival of Reason. The primary leader of this movement, Jacques Hébert, held such a festival in the Cathedral of Notre Dame, with an actress playing the Goddess of Reason. But Robespierre was unmoved by Hébert and had him and all his followers beheaded.

=== Thermidorian Reaction (1794–1795) ===
On 27 July 1794 (9 Thermidor Year II), a coalition of deputies in the National Convention turned against the leading members of the Committee of Public Safety, most notably Robespierre, who had come to personify the excesses of the Reign of Terror. Supported by factions within the Convention opposed to further purges and by officials concerned for their own safety, the coup resulted in the arrest of Robespierre, Louis Antoine de Saint-Just, Georges Couthon, and their associates. They were executed without trial the following day. The fall of Robespierre marked the end of Jacobin dominance and the radical phase of the French Revolution.

In its aftermath, the Convention dismantled many institutions associated with the Terror and relaxed political repression. In the months that followed, reprisals against former Jacobins and sans-culottes occurred in what became known as the First White Terror. On 17 August 1795, the Convention adopted the Constitution of the Year III, which was ratified by plebiscite in September and came into effect on 26 September.

=== Directory (1795–1799) ===
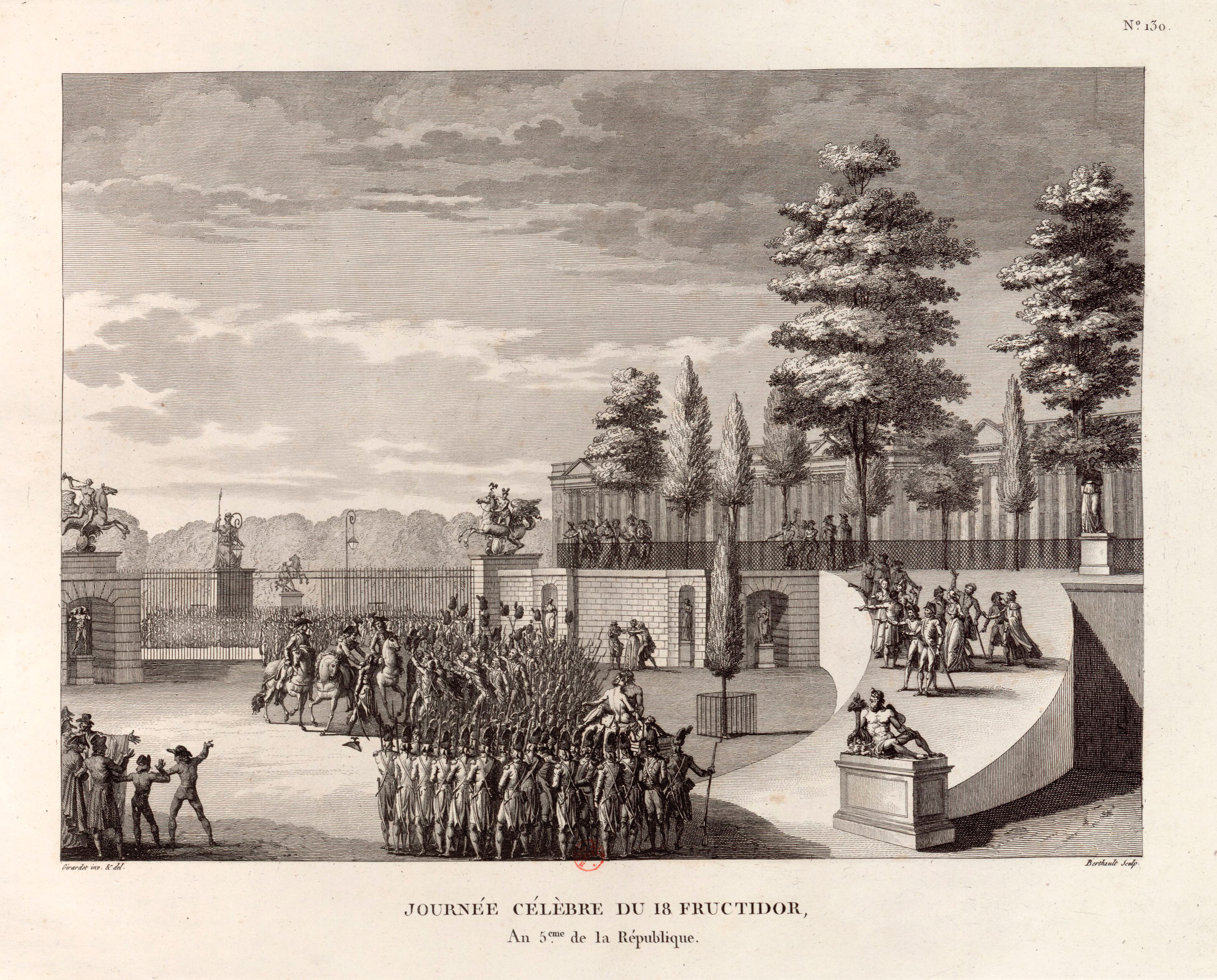
The army arrests General Jean-Charles Pichegru at the Tuileries Palace (4 September 1797)

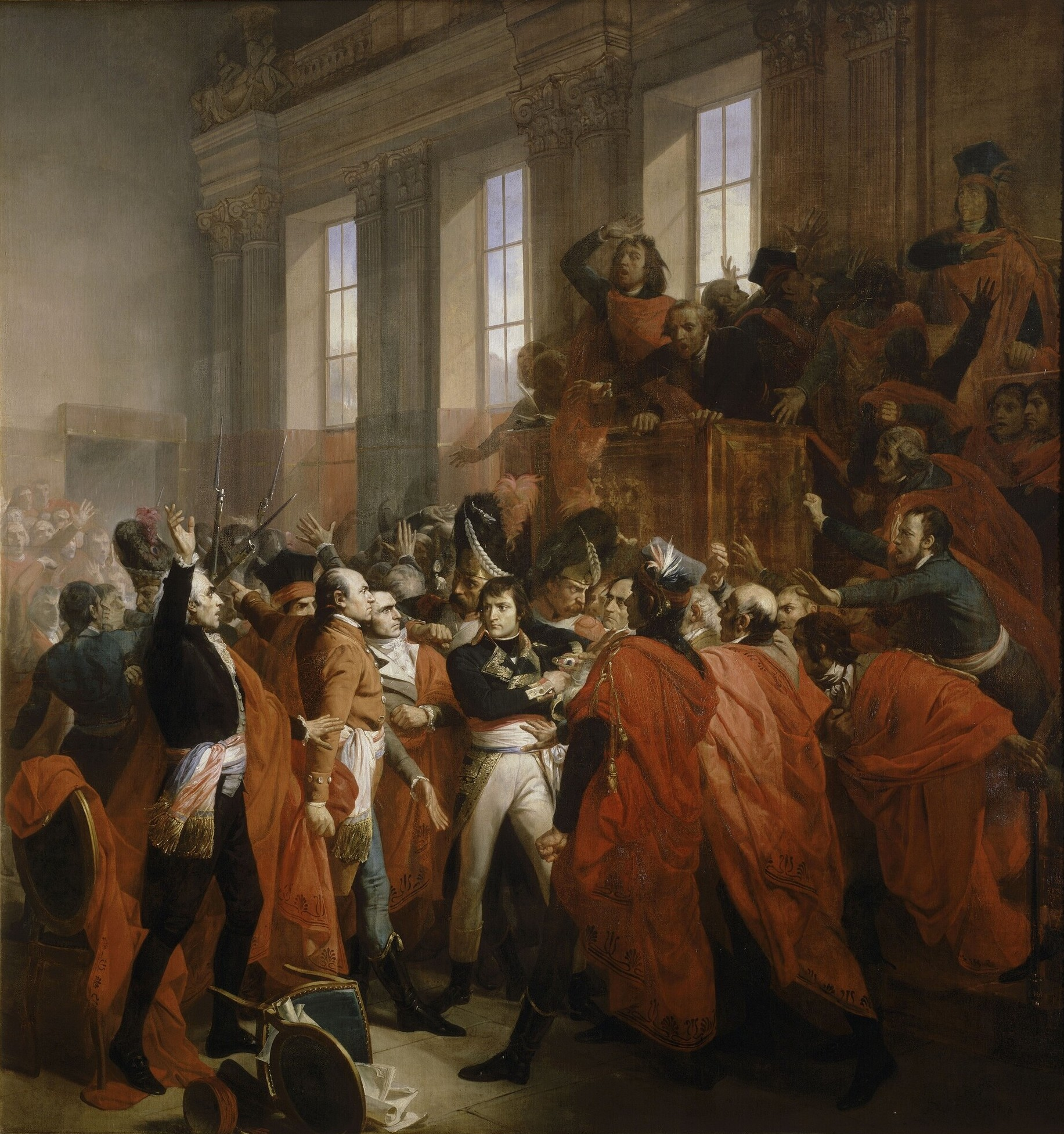
Bonaparte at the Council of Five Hundred at Saint-Cloud by François Bouchot. Napoleon Bonaparte seizes power and establishes the Consulate in 1799.

The new constitution installed the Directoire and created France's bicameral legislature. It was markedly more conservative, dominated by the bourgeoise, and sought to restore order and exclude the sans-culottes and other members of the lower classes from political life.

By 1795, the French had once again conquered the Austrian Netherlands and the left bank of the Rhine, annexing them directly into France. The Dutch Republic and Spain were both defeated and made into French satellites. At sea however, the French navy proved no match for the British, and was badly beaten off the coast of Ireland in the Glorious First of June.

Napoleon Bonaparte was given command of an army in 1796 that was to invade Italy. The young general defeated the Austrian and Sardinian forces and he negotiated the Treaty of Campo Formio without the input of the Directory. The French annexation of the Austrian Netherlands and the left bank of the Rhine was recognized, as were the satellite republics they created in northern Italy.

Although the War of the First Coalition ended in 1797, a second coalition was formed in May 1798 when France invaded the Swiss Confederation, the Kingdom of Naples, and the Papal States. Napoleon convinced the Directory to approve an expedition to Egypt, with the purpose of cutting off Britain's access to India. He got approval for this, and set off in May 1798 for Egypt with 40,000 men. But the expedition foundered when the British fleet of Horatio Nelson caught and destroyed most of the French navy that had accompanied Napoleon in the Battle of the Nile. The army had no way to return to France and faced the hostility of the Ottoman Empire.

=== Consulate (1799–1804) ===
Napoleon himself escaped back to France, where he led the coup d'état of November 1799, making himself First Consul (his hapless troops remained in Egypt until they surrendered to a British expedition in 1801 and were repatriated to France).

By that point, the War of the Second Coalition was in progress. The French suffered a string of defeats in 1799, seeing their satellite republics in Italy overthrown and an invasion of Germany beaten back. Attempts by the allies on Switzerland and the Netherlands failed however, and once Napoleon returned to France, he began turning the tide on them. In 1801, the Peace of Lunéville ended hostilities with Austria and Russia, and the Treaty of Amiens with Britain.

== First Empire (1804–1814) ==
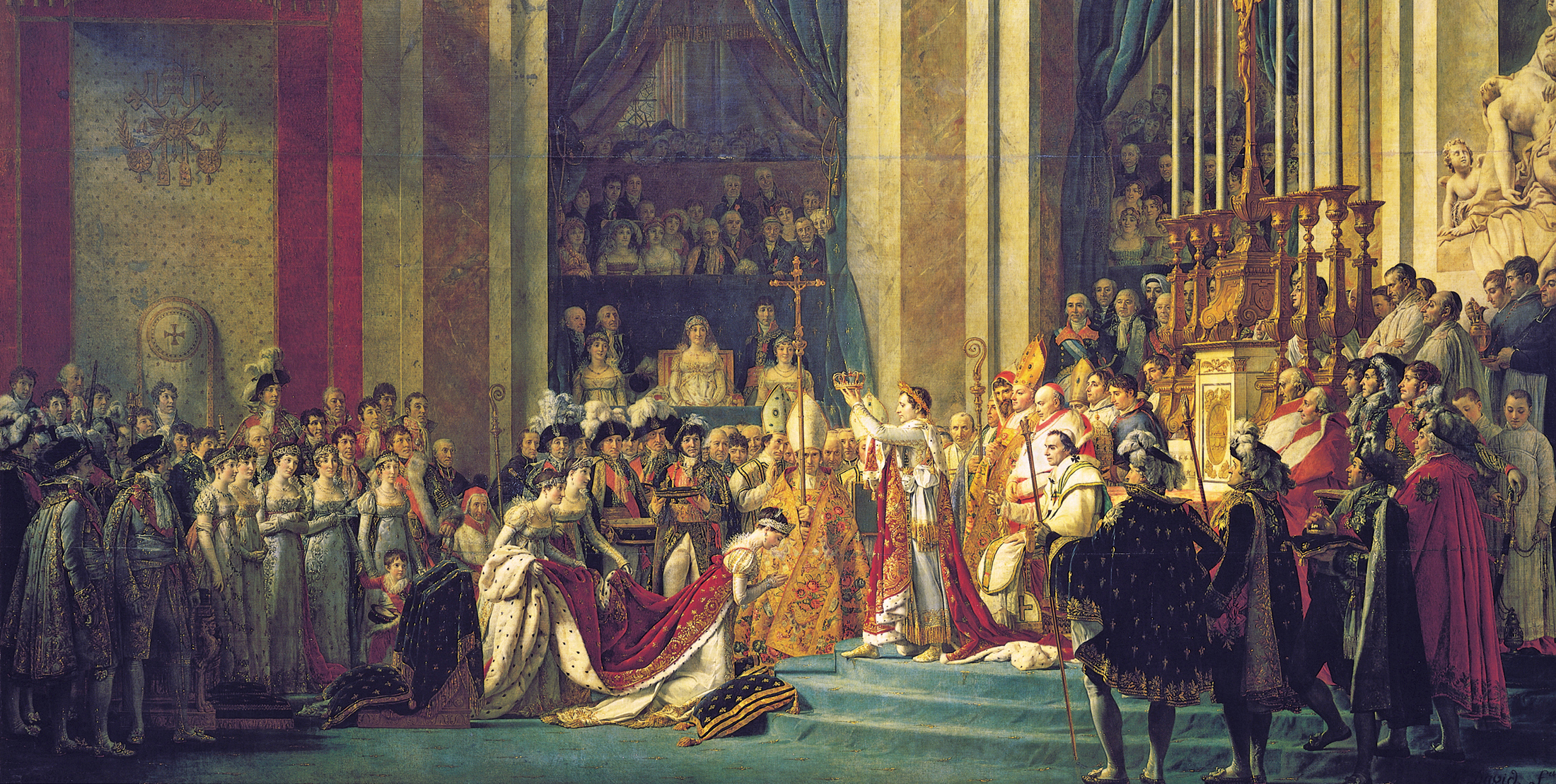
David's The Coronation of Napoleon (1807)

By 1802, Napoleon was named First Consul for life. His continued provocations of the British led to renewed war in 1803, and the following year he proclaimed himself emperor in a huge ceremony in the Cathedral of Notre Dame. The pope was invited to the coronation, but Napoleon took the crown from him at the last minute and placed it on his own head. He attracted more power and gravitated towards imperial status, gathering support on the way for his internal rebuilding of France and its institutions. The French Empire (or the Napoleonic Empire) (1804–1814) was marked by the French domination and reorganization of continental Europe (the Napoleonic Wars) and by the final codification of the republican legal system (the Napoleonic Code). The Empire gradually became more authoritarian in nature, with freedom of the press and assembly being severely restricted. Religious freedom survived under the condition that Christianity and Judaism, the two officially recognized faiths, not be attacked, and that atheism not be expressed in public. Napoleon also recreated the nobility, but neither they nor his court had the elegance or historical connections of the old monarchy. Despite the growing administrative despotism of his regime, the emperor was still seen by the rest of Europe as the embodiment of the Revolution and a monarchial parvenu.

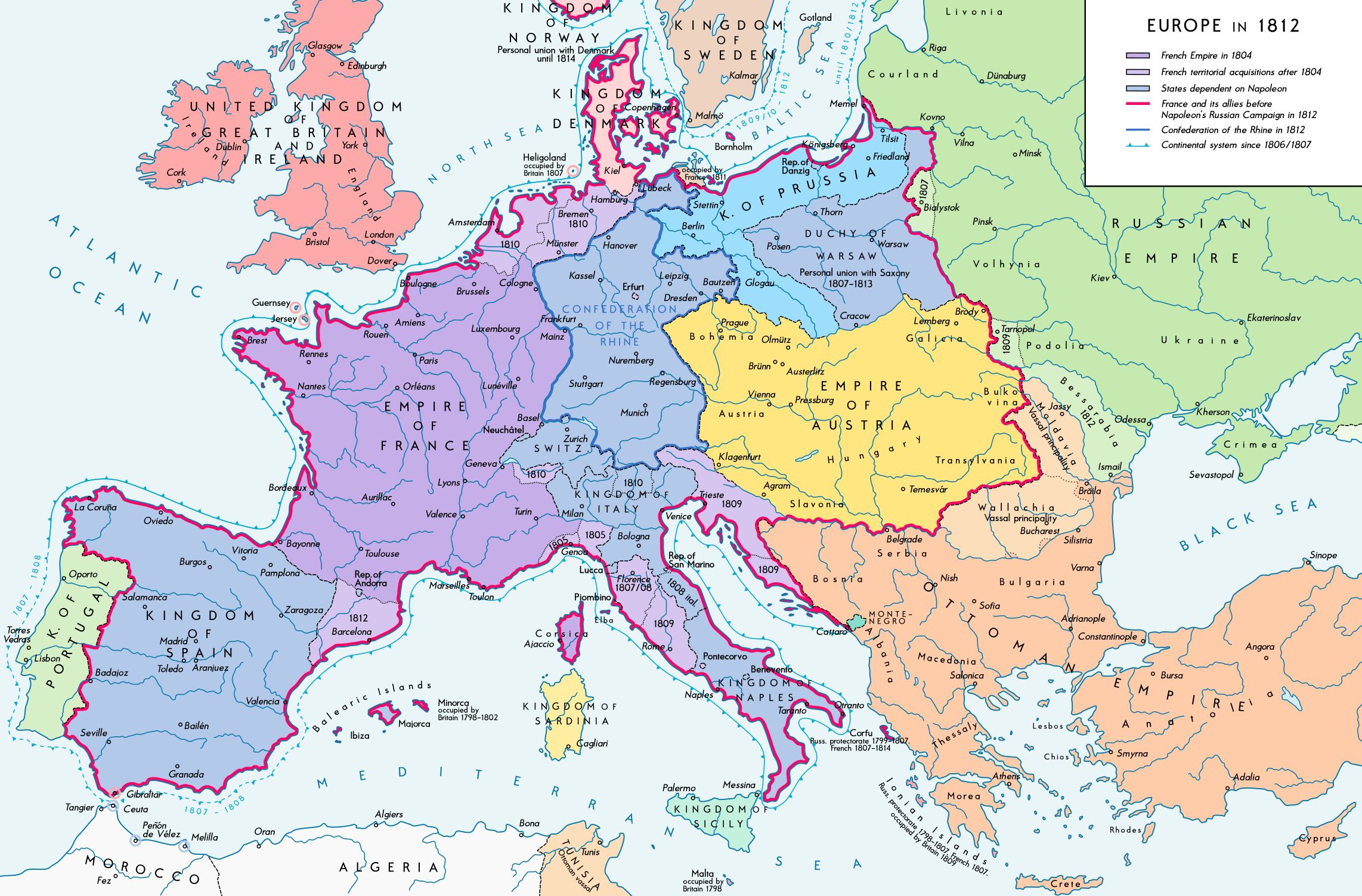
Map of the First French Empire and its Allies in Europe by 1812

By 1804, Britain alone stood outside French control and was an important force in encouraging and financing resistance to France. In 1805, Napoleon massed an army of 200,000 men in Boulogne for the purpose of invading the British Isles, but never was able to find the right conditions to embark, and thus abandoned his plans. Three weeks later, the French and Spanish fleets were destroyed by the British at Trafalgar. Afterwards, Napoleon, unable to defeat Britain militarily, tried to bring it down through economic warfare. He inaugurated the Continental System, in which all of France's allies and satellites would join in refusing to trade with the British.

Portugal, an ally of Britain, was the only European country that openly refused to join. After the Treaties of Tilsit of July 1807, the French launched an invasion through Spain to close this hole in the Continental System. British troops arrived in Portugal, compelling the French to withdraw. A renewed invasion the following year brought the British back, and at that point, Napoleon decided to depose the Spanish king Charles IV and place his brother Joseph on the throne. This caused the people of Spain to rise up in a patriotic revolt, beginning the Peninsular War. The British could now gain a foothold on the Continent, and the war tied down considerable French resources, contributing to Napoleon's eventual defeat.

Napoleon was at the height of his power in 1810–1812, with most of the European countries either his allies, satellites, or annexed directly into France. After the defeat of Austria in the War of the Fifth Coalition, Europe was at peace for 2 1/2 years except for the conflict in Spain. The emperor was given an archduchess to marry by the Austrians, and she gave birth to his long-awaited son in 1811.

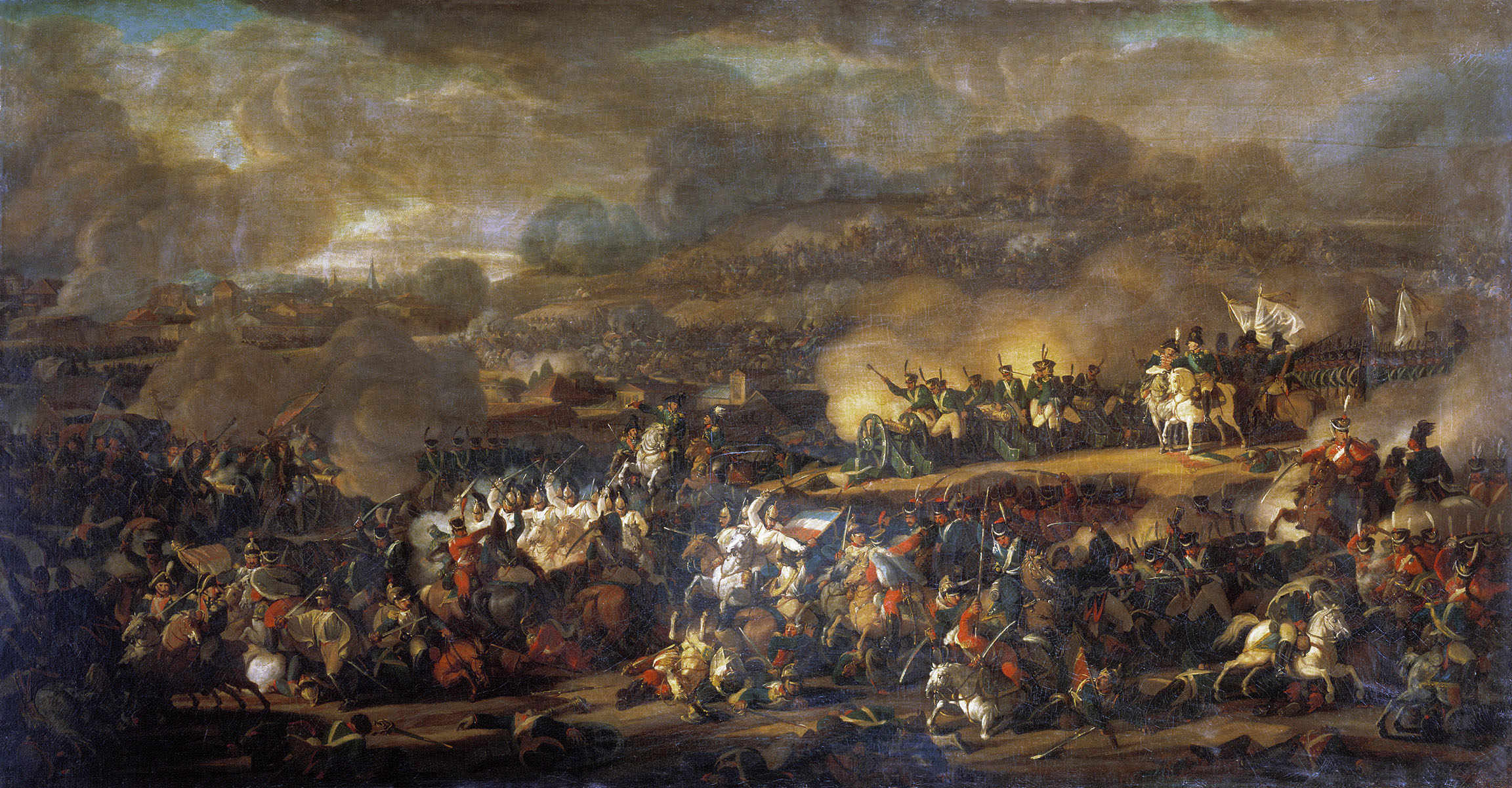
The battle of Leipzig, the largest battle in Europe prior to World War I

Ultimately, the Continental System failed. Its effect on Great Britain and on British trade is uncertain, but the embargo is thought to have been more harmful on the continental European states. Russia in particular chafed under the embargo, and in 1812, that country reopened trade with Britain, provoking Napoleon's invasion of Russia. The disaster of that campaign caused all the subjugated peoples of Europe to rise up against French domination. In 1813, Napoleon was forced to conscript boys under the age of 18 and less able-bodied men who had been passed up for military service in previous years. The quality of his troops deteriorated sharply and war-weariness at home increased. The allies could also put far more men in the field than he could. Throughout 1813, the French were forced back and by early 1814, the British were occupying Gascony. The allied troops reached Paris in March, and Napoleon abdicated as emperor. Louis XVIII, the brother of Louis XVI, was installed as king and France was granted a quite generous peace settlement, being restored to its 1792 boundaries and having to pay no war indemnity.

After eleven months of exile on the island of Elba in the Mediterranean, Napoleon escaped and returned to France, where he was greeted with huge enthusiasm. Louis XVIII fled Paris, but the one thing that would have given the emperor mass support, a return to the revolutionary extremism of 1793–1794, was out of the question. Enthusiasm quickly waned, and as the allies (then discussing the fate of Europe in Vienna) refused to negotiate with him, he had no choice but to fight. At Waterloo, Napoleon was completely defeated by the British and Prussians, and abdicated once again. This time, he was exiled to the island of Saint Helena in the South Atlantic, where he remained until his death in 1821.

== Bourbon Restoration (1814–1830) ==
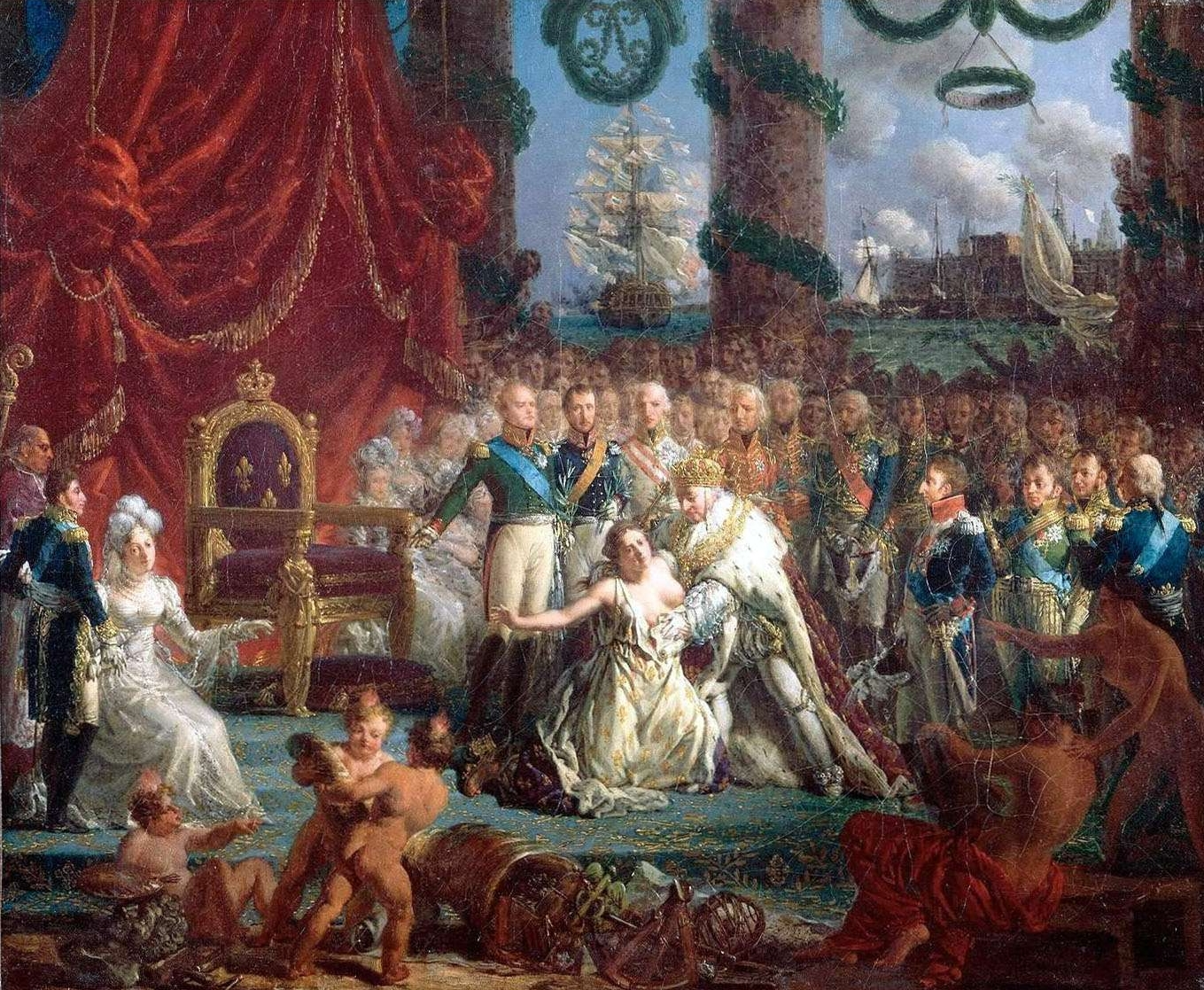
Louis XVIII Raising France from Its Ruins by Louis-Philippe Crépin, 1814

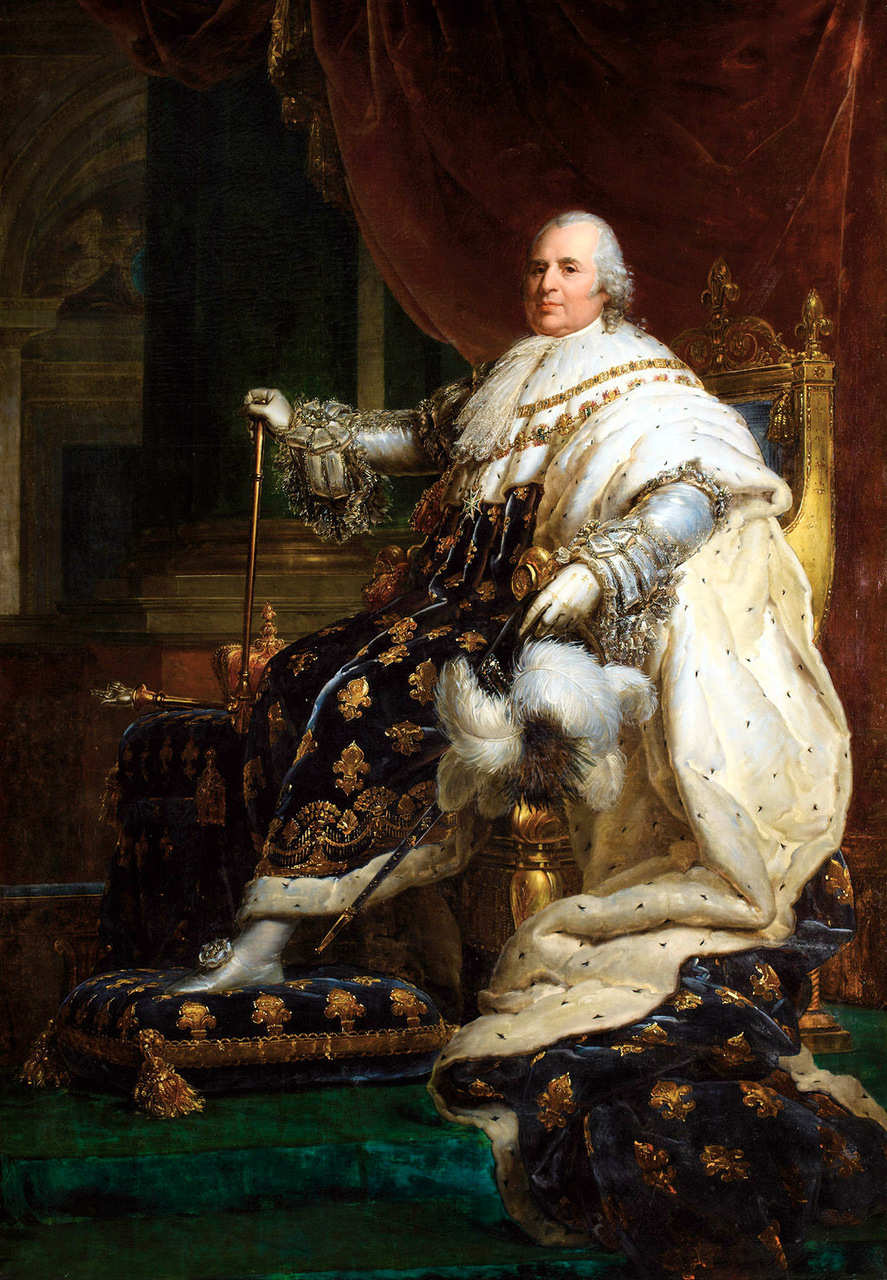
Portrait of Louis XVIII, reigned 1814–1824.

Louis XVIII was restored a second time by the allies in 1815, ending more than two decades of war. He announced he would rule as a limited, constitutional monarch. After the Hundred Days in 1815 when Napoleon suddenly returned and was vanquished, a more harsh peace treaty was imposed on France, returning it to its 1789 boundaries and requiring a war indemnity in gold. Allied troops remained in the country until it was paid. There were large-scale purges of Bonapartists from the government and military, and a brief "White Terror" in the south of France claimed 300 victims. Otherwise the transition was largely peaceful. Although the old ruling class had returned they did not recover their lost lands, and were unable to reverse most of the dramatic changes in French society, economics, and ways of thinking.

In 1823, France intervened in Spain, where a civil war had deposed king Ferdinand VII. The French troops marched into Spain, retook Madrid from the rebels, and left almost as quickly as they came. Despite worries to the contrary, France showed no sign of returning to an aggressive foreign policy and was admitted to the Concert of Europe in 1818.

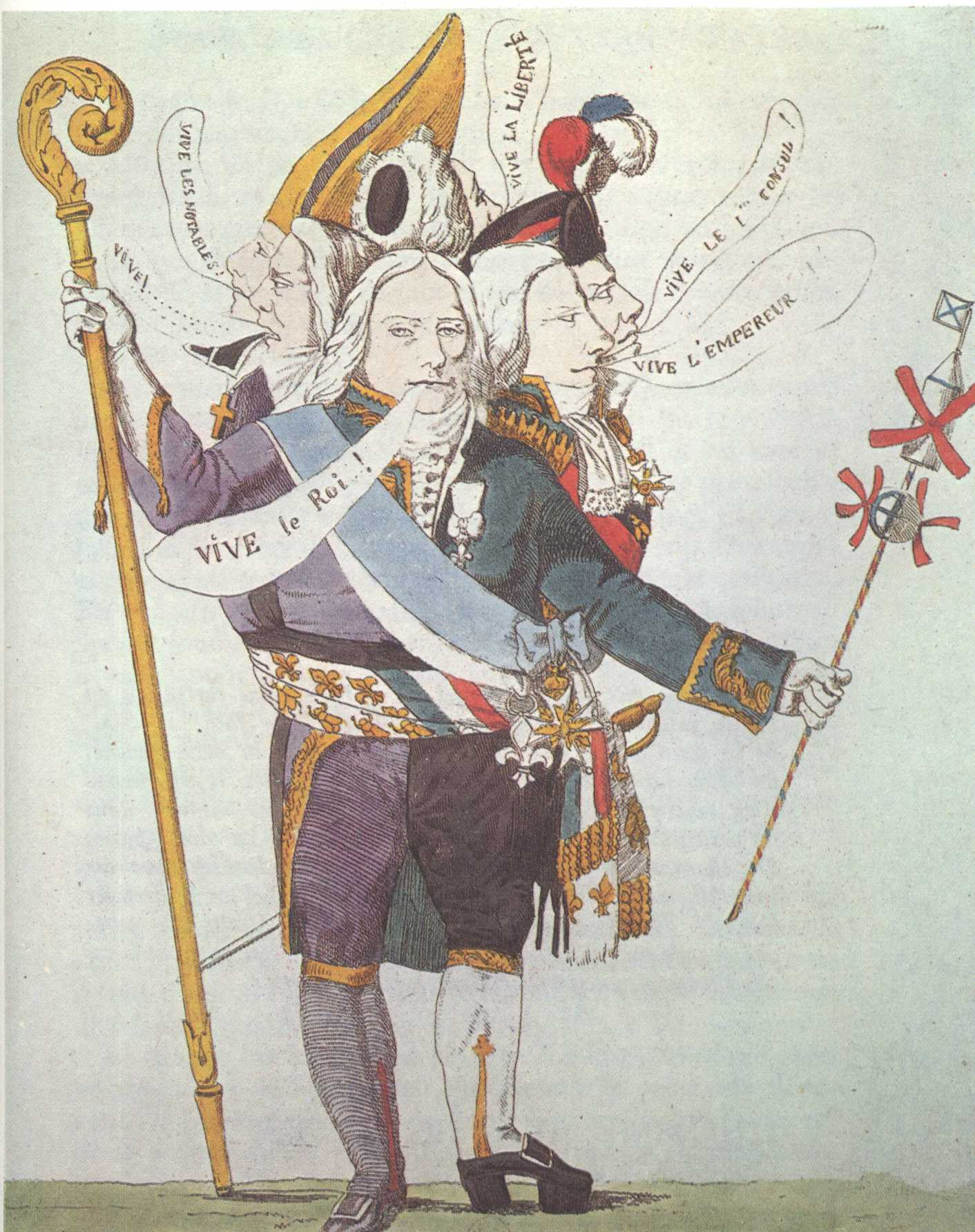
Charles Maurice de Talleyrand-Périgord, who served under several regimes, depicted "floating with the tide". Note the high heel of his left shoe, alluding both to his limp and the Devil's hoof.

Louis XVIII, for the most part, accepted that much had changed. However, he was pushed on his right by the Ultra-royalists, led by the comte de Villèle, who condemned the Doctrinaires' attempt to reconcile the Revolution with the monarchy through a constitutional monarchy. Instead, the Chambre introuvable elected in 1815 banished all Conventionnels who had voted Louis XVI's death and passed several reactionary laws. Louis XVIII was forced to dissolve this Chamber, dominated by the Ultras, in 1816, fearing a popular uprising. The liberals thus governed until the 1820 assassination of the duc de Berry, the nephew of the king and known supporter of the Ultras, which brought Villèle's ultras back to power.

Louis died on September the 16th in the year 1824 and was succeeded by his brother. Charles X of France followed the "ultra" conservative line but was a much less effective coalition builder than Louis XVIII. In May 1825 he staged a grand coronation ceremony in Reims which harked back to the pre-1789 era. Freedom of the press was severely restricted. He compensated the families of the nobles who had had their property taken during the Revolution. In 1830 the discontent caused by these changes and Charles X's authoritarian nomination of the Ultra prince de Polignac as prime minister led to his overthrow.

The Restoration did not try to resurrect the ancien régime. Too much had changed for that. The egalitarianism and liberalism of the revolutionaries remained an important force and the autocracy and hierarchy of the earlier era could not be fully restored. The economic changes, which had been underway long before the revolution, had been further enhanced during the years of turmoil and were firmly entrenched by 1815. These changes had seen power shift from the noble landowners to the urban merchants. The administrative reforms of Napoleon, such as the Napoleonic Code and efficient bureaucracy, also remained in place. These changes produced a unified central government that was fiscally sound — for example, the indemnities imposed by the victors were quickly paid off, and the occupation troops left quietly. The national government did not face strong regional parliaments or power centers and had solid control over all areas of France in sharp contrast with the chaotic situation the Bourbons had faced in the 1770s and 1780s. Restoration did not lessen inequality in France, and it did not promote industrialisation. On the whole, however, there was more wealth, and more political freedom for all classes. The parliamentary system worked well. Restrictions on the press resembled those in most of Europe. Frequent parliamentary transitions took place, but the losers were not executed or exiled. France regained its place among the respected major powers, and its voice was heard in international diplomacy. There was a new sense of humanitarianism, and popular piety. France began, on a small scale, to rebuild the overseas empire it had lost in 1763.

== July Monarchy (1830–1848) ==
Liberty Leading the People (1830) by Eugène Delacroix, based on the July Revolution

Charles X was overthrown in an uprising in the streets of Paris, known as the 1830 July Revolution (or, in French, "Les trois Glorieuses" - The three Glorious days - of 27, 28 and July 29). Charles was forced to flee and Louis-Philippe d'Orléans, a member of the Orléans branch of the family, and son of Philippe Égalité who had voted the death of his cousin Louis XVI, ascended the throne. Louis-Philippe ruled, not as "King of France" but as "King of the French" (an evocative difference for contemporaries). It was made clear that his right to rule came from the people and was not divinely granted. He also revived the Tricolor as the flag of France, in place of the white Bourbon flag that had been used since 1815, an important distinction because the Tricolour was the symbol of the revolution. The July Monarchy (1830–1848) saw the political dominance of the high middle class (haute bourgeoisie). Louis-Philippe clearly understood his base of power: the wealthy bourgeoisie had carried him aloft during the July Revolution and he kept their interests in mind.

Louis-Philippe, who had flirted with liberalism in his youth, rejected much of the pomp and circumstance of the Bourbons and surrounded himself with merchants and bankers. The July Monarchy, however, remained a time of turmoil. A large group of Legitimists on the right demanded the restoration of the Bourbons to the throne. On the left, Republicanism and, later Socialism, remained a powerful force. Late in his reign Louis-Philippe became increasingly rigid and dogmatic and his President of the Council, François Guizot, had become deeply unpopular, but Louis-Philippe refused to remove him. The situation gradually escalated until the Revolutions of 1848 saw the fall of the monarchy and the creation of the Second Republic.

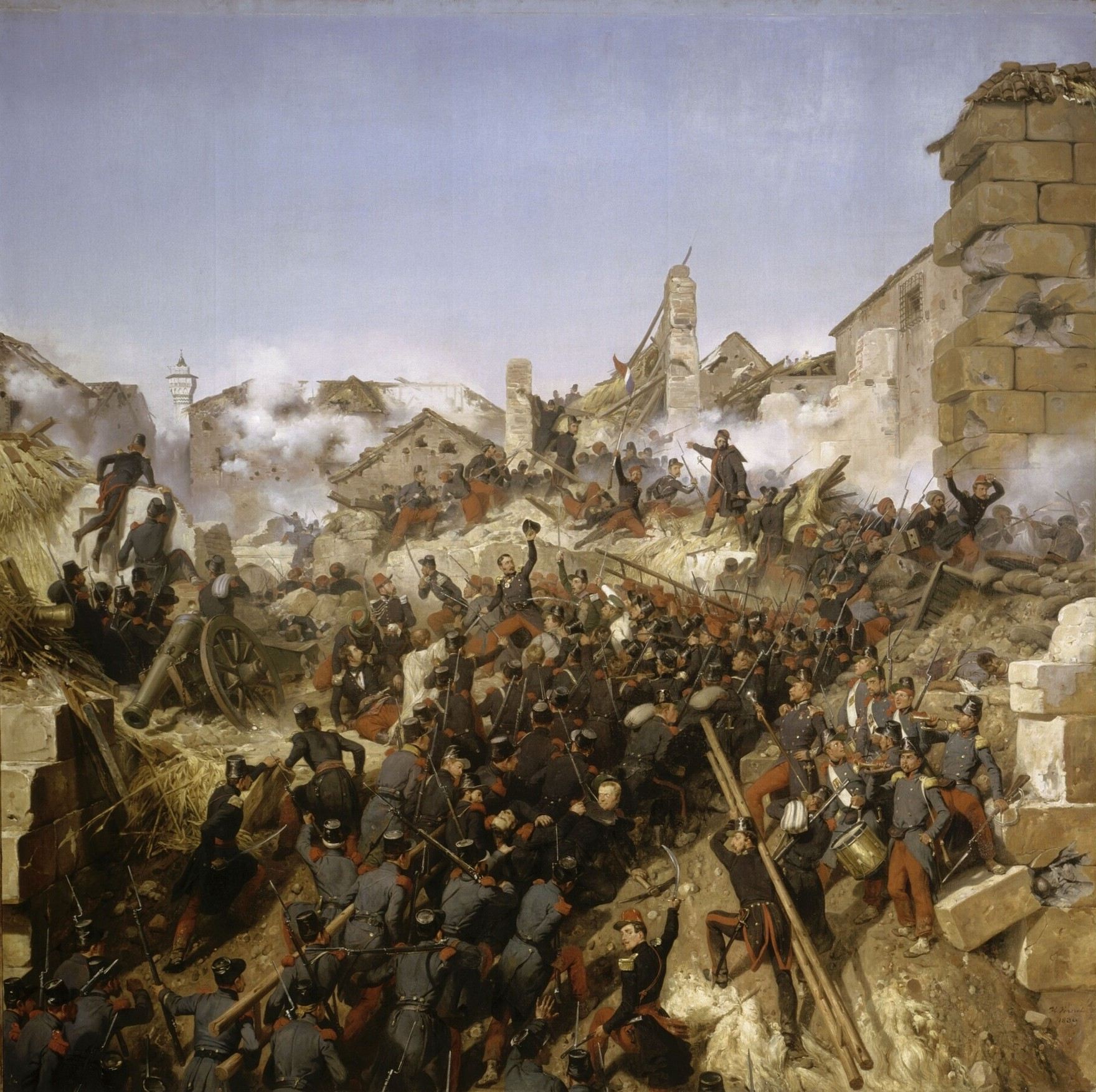
French soldiers capture Constantine during the invasion of Algeria, 1837

However, during the first several years of his regime, Louis-Philippe appeared to move his government toward legitimate, broad-based reform. The government found its source of legitimacy within the Charter of 1830, written by reform-minded members of Chamber of Deputies upon a platform of religious equality, the empowerment of the citizenry through the reestablishment of the National Guard, electoral reform, the reformation of the peerage system, and the lessening of royal authority. And indeed, Louis-Phillipe and his ministers adhered to policies that seemed to promote the central tenets of the constitution. However, the majority of these policies were veiled attempts to shore up the power and influence of the government and the bourgeoisie, rather than legitimate attempts to promote equality and empowerment for a broad constituency of the French population. Thus, though the July Monarchy seemed to move toward reform, this movement was largely illusory.

During the years of the July Monarchy, enfranchisement roughly doubled, from 94,000 under Charles X to more than 200,000 by 1848. However, this represented less than one percent of population, and, as the requirements for voting were tax-based, only the wealthiest gained the privilege. By implication, the enlarged enfranchisement tended to favor the wealthy merchant bourgeoisie more than any other group. Beyond simply increasing their presence within the Chamber of Deputies, this electoral enlargement provided the bourgeoisie the means by which to challenge the nobility in legislative matters. Thus, while appearing to honor his pledge to increase suffrage, Louis-Philippe acted primarily to empower his supporters and increase his hold over the French Parliament. The inclusion of only the wealthiest also tended to undermine any possibility of the growth of a radical faction in Parliament, effectively serving socially conservative ends.

The reformed Charter of 1830 limited the power of the King – stripping him of his ability to propose and decree legislation, as well as limiting his executive authority. However, the King of the French still believed in a version of monarchy that held the king as much more than a figurehead for an elected Parliament, and as such, he was quite active in politics. One of the first acts of Louis-Philippe in constructing his cabinet was to appoint the rather conservative Casimir Perier as the premier of that body. Perier, a banker, was instrumental in shutting down many of the Republican secret societies and labour unions that had formed during the early years of the regime. In addition, he oversaw the dismemberment of the National Guard after it proved too supportive of radical ideologies. He performed all of these actions, of course, with royal approval. He was once quoted as saying that the source of French misery was the belief that there had been a revolution. "No Monsieur", he said to another minister, "there has not been a revolution: there is simply a change at the head of state."

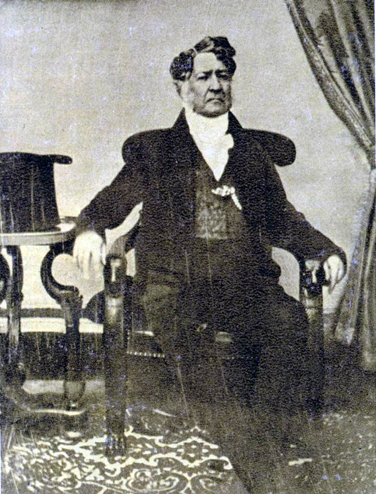
Louis-Philippe I, the liberal and constitutional King of the French, brought to power by the July Revolution

Further expressions of this conservative trend came under the supervision of Perier and the then Minister of the Interior, François Guizot. The regime acknowledged early on that radicalism and republicanism threatened it, undermining its laissez-faire policies. Thus, the Monarchy declared the very term republican illegal in 1834. Guizot shut down republican clubs and disbanded republican publications. Republicans within the cabinet, like the banker Dupont, were all but excluded by Perier and his conservative clique. Distrusting the National Guard, Louis-Philippe increased the size of the army and reformed it in order to ensure its loyalty to the government.

Though two factions always persisted in the cabinet, split between liberal conservatives like Guizot (le parti de la Résistance, the Party of Resistance) and liberal reformers like the aforementioned journalist Adolphe Thiers (le parti du Mouvement, the Party of Movement), the latter never gained prominence. After Perier came count Molé, another conservative. After Molé came Thiers, a reformer later sacked by Louis-Philippe after attempting to pursue an aggressive foreign policy. After Thiers came the conservative Guizot. In particular, the Guizot administration was marked by increasingly authoritarian crackdowns on republicanism and dissent, and an increasingly pro-business laissez-faire policy. This policy included protective tariffs that defended the status quo and enriched French businessmen. Guizot's government granted railway and mining contracts to the bourgeois supporters of the government, and even contributing some of the start-up costs. As workers under these policies had no legal right to assemble, unionize, or petition the government for increased pay or decreased hours, the July Monarchy under Perier, Molé, and Guizot generally proved detrimental to the lower classes. In fact, Guizot's advice to those who were disenfranchised by the tax-based electoral requirements was a simple "enrichissez-vous" – enrich yourself. The king himself was not very popular either by the middle of the 1840s, and due to his appearance was widely referred to as the "crowned pear". There was a considerable hero-worship of Napoleon during this era, and in 1841 his body was taken from Saint Helena and given a magnificent reburial in France.

Louis-Philippe conducted a pacifistic foreign policy. Shortly after he assumed power in 1830, Belgium revolted against Dutch rule and proclaimed its independence. The king rejected the idea of intervention there or any military activities outside France's borders. The only exception to this was a war in Algeria which had been started by Charles X a few weeks before his overthrow on the pretext of suppressing pirates in the Mediterranean. Louis-Philippe's government decided to continue the conquest of that country, which took over a decade. By 1848, Algeria had been declared an integral part of France.

== Second Republic (1848–1852) ==
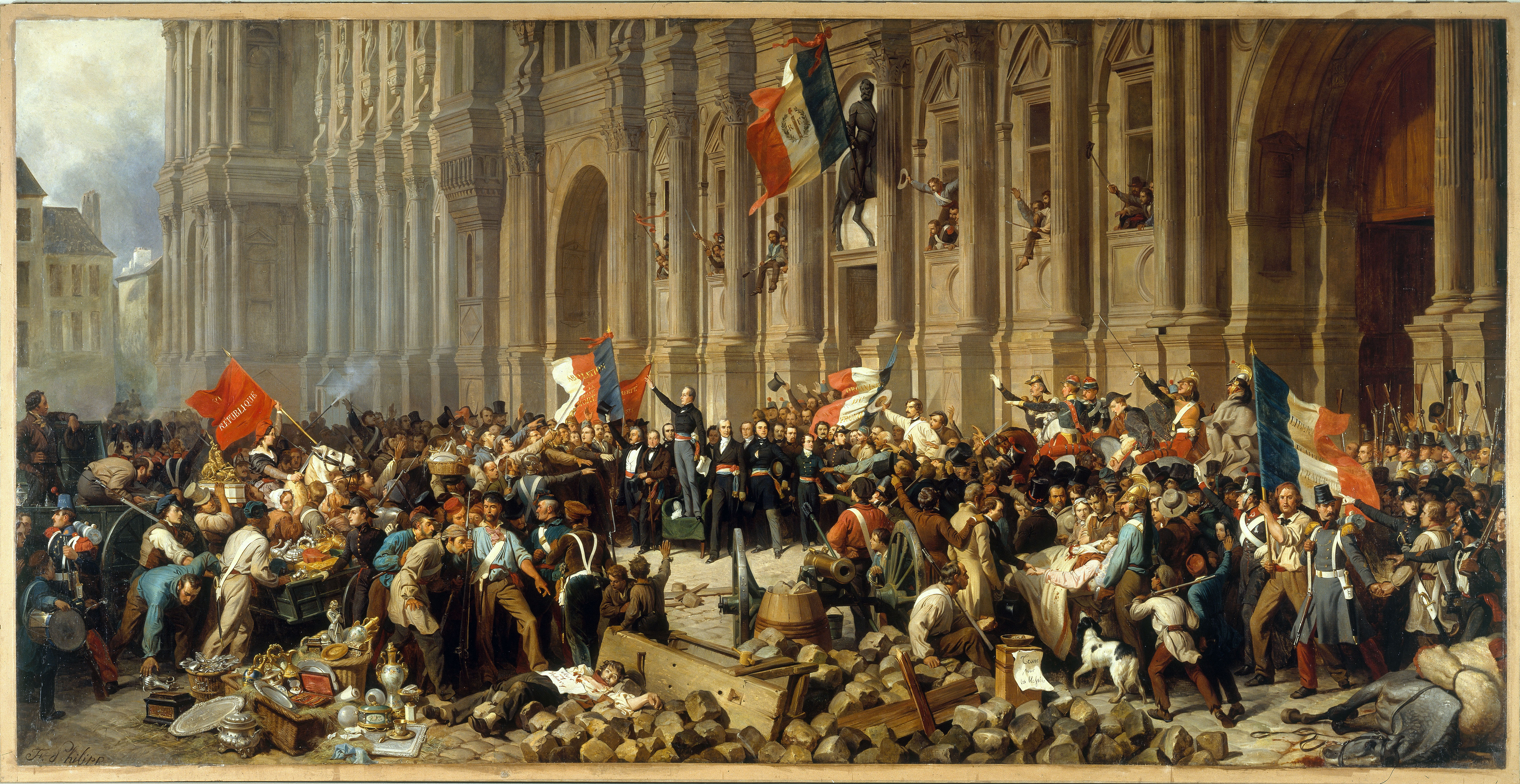
Lamartine Rejecting the Red Flag in Front of the City Hall by Henri Félix Emmanuel Philippoteaux

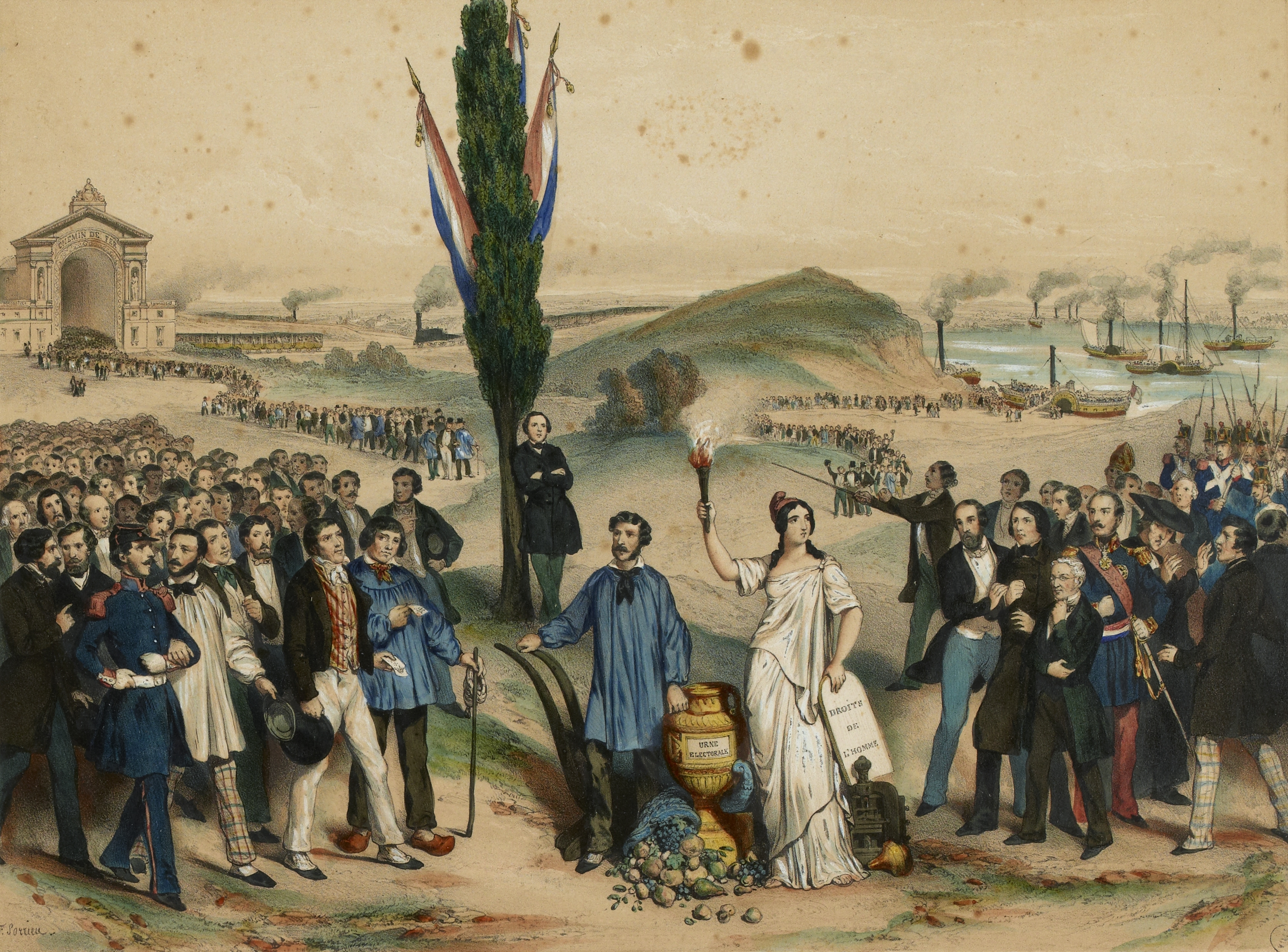
France became the first country to adopt universal male suffrage.

The Revolution of 1848 had major consequences for all of Europe: popular democratic revolts against authoritarian regimes broke out in Austria and Hungary, in the German Confederation and Prussia, and in the Italian states of Milan, Venice, Turin and Rome. Economic downturns and bad harvests during the 1840s contributed to growing discontent.

In February 1848, the French government banned the holding of the Campagne des banquets, fundraising dinners by activists where critics of the regime would meet (as public demonstrations and strikes were forbidden). As a result, protests and riots broke out in the streets of Paris. An angry mob converged on the royal palace, after which the king abdicated and fled to England. The Second Republic was then proclaimed.

The revolution in France had brought together classes of wildly different interests: the bourgeoisie desired electoral reforms (a democratic republic), socialist leaders (like Louis Blanc, Pierre Joseph Proudhon and the radical Auguste Blanqui) asked for a "right to work" and the creation of national workshops (a social welfare republic) and for France to liberate the oppressed peoples of Europe (Poles and Italians), while moderates (like the aristocrat Alphonse de Lamartine) sought a middle ground. Tensions between groups escalated, and in June 1848, a working class insurrection in Paris cost the lives of 1500 workers and eliminated once and for all the dream of a social welfare constitution.

The constitution of the Second Republic which was ratified in September 1848 was extremely flawed and permitted no effective resolution between the President and the Assembly in case of dispute. In December 1848, a nephew of Napoléon Bonaparte, Charles Louis Napoléon Bonaparte, was elected as President of the Republic, and pretexting legislative gridlock, in 1851, he staged a coup d'état. Finally, in 1852 he had himself declared Emperor Napoléon III of the Second Empire.

== Second Empire (1852–1870) ==
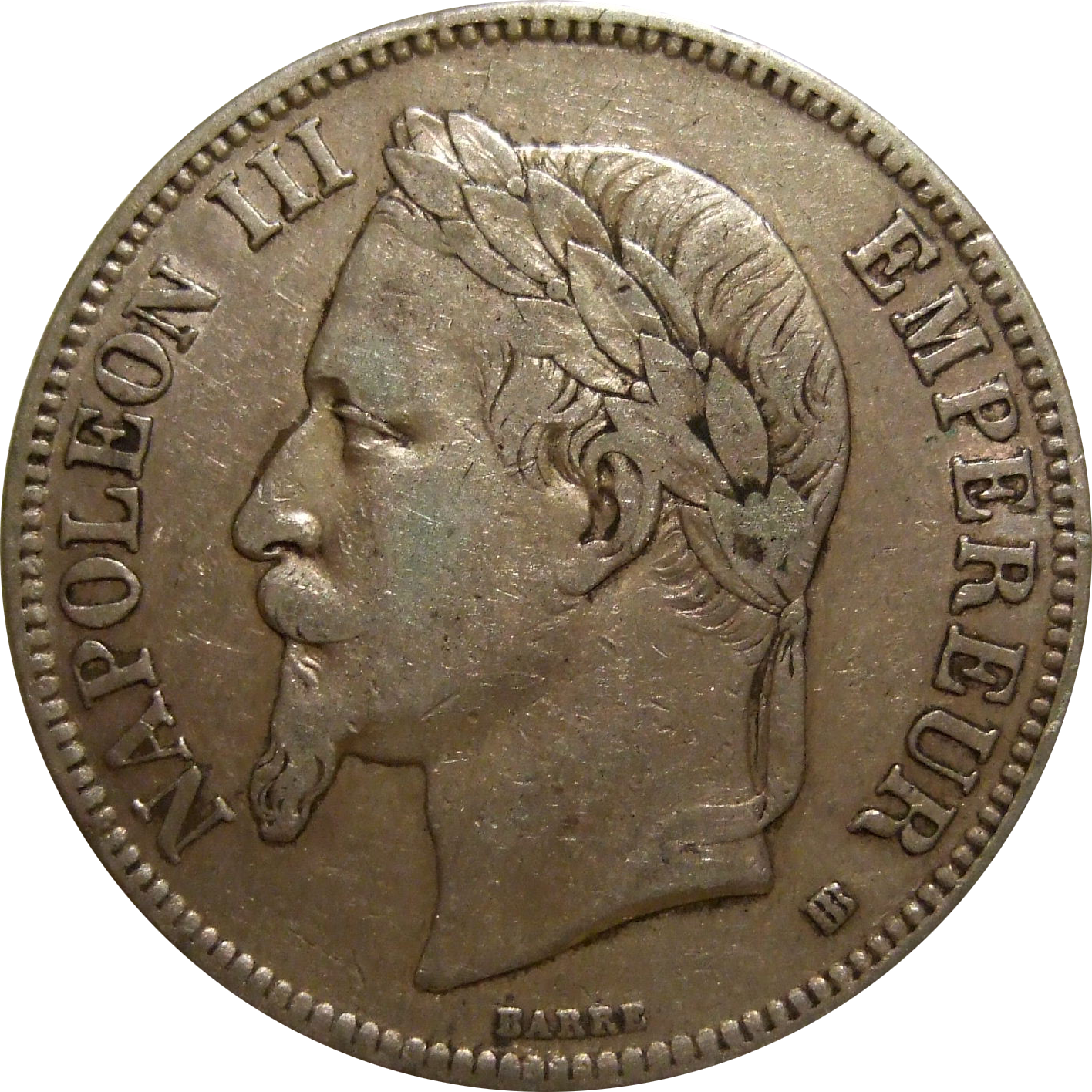
Napoleon III on a coin

France was ruled by Emperor Napoleon III from 1852 to 1870. The regime was authoritarian in nature during its early years, curbing most freedom of the press and assembly. The era saw great industrialization, urbanization (including the massive rebuilding of Paris by Baron Haussmann) and economic growth, but Napoleon III's foreign policies would be catastrophic.

In 1852, Napoleon declared that "L'Empire, c'est la paix" (The empire is peace), but it was hardly fitting for a Bonaparte to continue the foreign policy of Louis-Philippe. Only a few months after becoming president in 1848, he sent French troops to break up a short-lived republic in Rome, remaining there until 1870. The overseas empire expanded, and France made gains in Indo-China, West and central Africa, and the South Seas. This was helped by the opening of large central banks in Paris to finance overseas expeditions. The Suez Canal was opened by the Empress Eugénie in 1869 and was the achievement of a Frenchman. Yet still, Napoleon III's France lagged behind Britain in colonial affairs, and his determination to upstage British control of India and American influence in Mexico resulted in a fiasco.

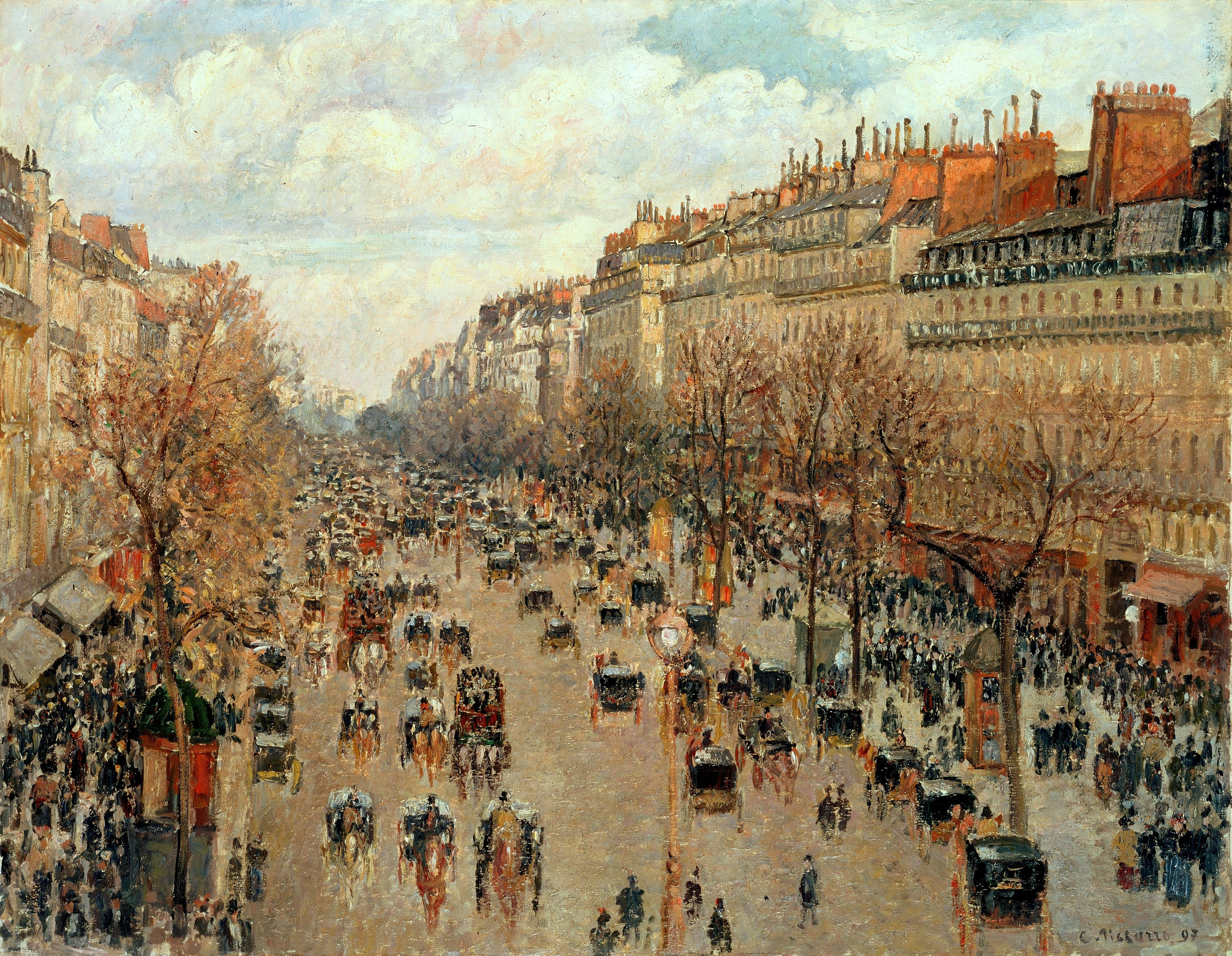
One of the Haussmann's Great Boulevards, Boulevard Montmartre painted by the artist Camille Pissarro (1893)

In 1854, the emperor allied with Britain and the Ottoman Empire against Russia in the Crimean War. Afterwards, Napoleon intervened in the questions of Italian independence. He declared his intention of making Italy "free from the Alps to the Adriatic", and fought a war with Austria in 1859 over this matter. With the victories of Montebello, Magenta and Solferino France and Austria signed the Peace of Villafranca in 1859, as the emperor worried that a longer war might cause the other powers, particularly Prussia, to intervene. Austria ceded Lombardy to Napoleon III, who in turn ceded it to Victor Emmanuel; Modena and Tuscany were restored to their respective dukes, and the Romagna to the pope, now president of an Italian federation. In exchange for France's military assistance against Austria, Piedmont ceded its provinces of Nice and Savoy to France in March 1860. Napoleon then turned his hand to meddling in the Western Hemisphere. He gave support to the Confederacy during the American Civil War, until Abraham Lincoln announced the Emancipation Proclamation in the autumn of 1862. As this made it impossible to support the South without also supporting slavery, the emperor backed off. However, he was conducting a simultaneous venture in Mexico, which had refused to pay interest on loans taken from France, Britain, and Spain. As a result, those three countries sent a joint expedition to the city of Veracruz in January 1862, but the British and Spanish quickly withdrew after realizing the extent of Napoleon's plans. French troops occupied Mexico City in June 1863 and established a puppet government headed by the Austrian archduke Maximilian, who was declared Emperor of Mexico. Although this sort of thing was forbidden by the Monroe Doctrine, Napoleon reasoned that the United States was far too distracted with its Civil War to do anything about it. The French were never able to suppress the forces of the ousted Mexican president Benito Juárez, and then in the spring of 1865, the American Civil War ended. The United States, which had an army of a million battle-hardened troops, demanded that the French withdraw or prepare for war. They quickly did so, but Maximilian tried to hold onto power. He was captured and shot by the Mexicans in 1867.

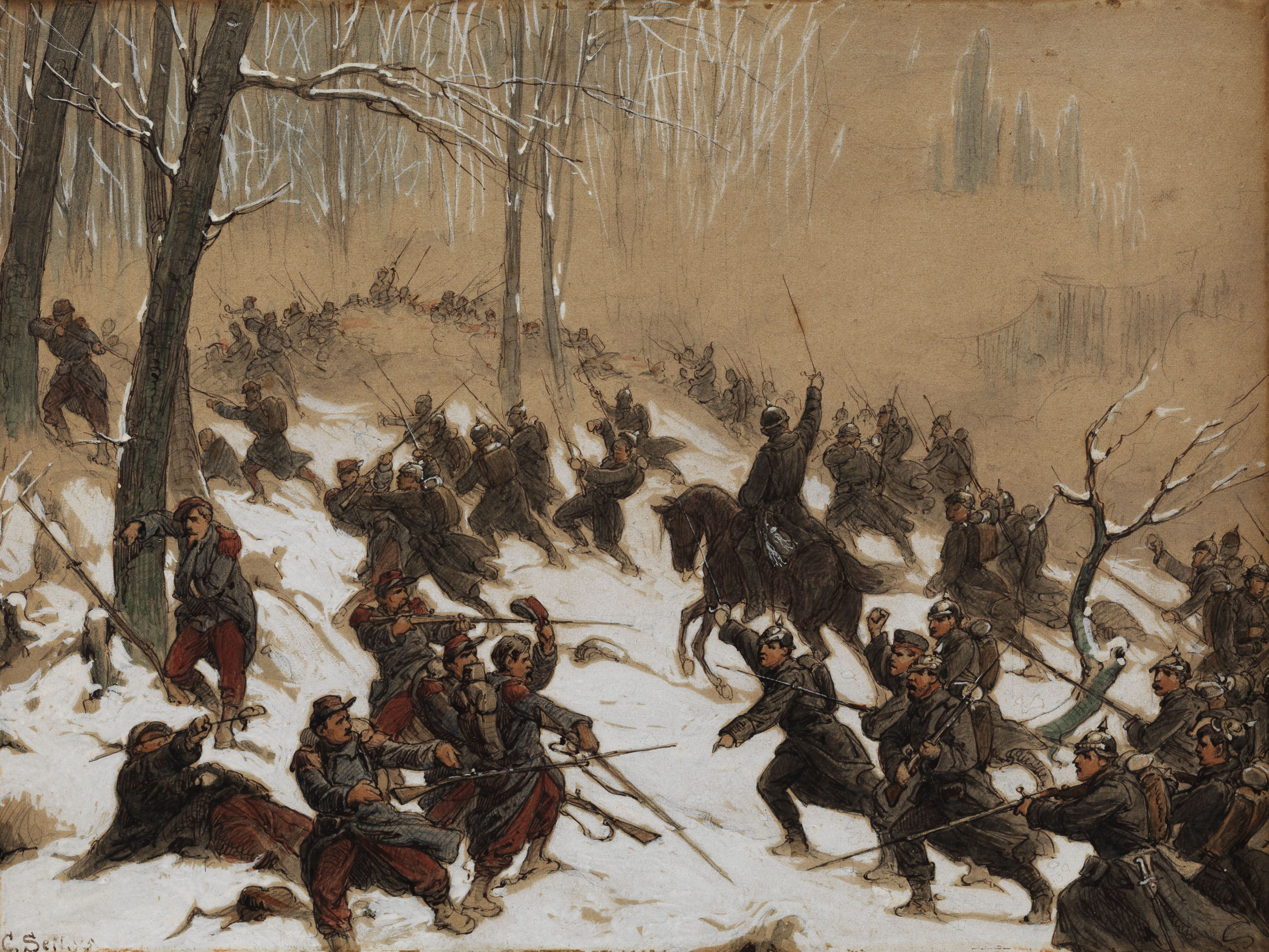
French soldiers assaulted by German infantry during the Franco-Prussian War, 1870

Public opinion was becoming a major force as people began to tire of oppressive authoritarianism in the 1860s. Napoleon III, who had expressed some liberal ideas prior to his coronation, began to relax censorship, laws on public meetings, and the right to strike. As a result, radicalism grew among industrial workers. Discontent with the Second Empire spread rapidly, as the economy began to experience a downturn. The golden days of the 1850s were over. Napoleon's reckless foreign policy was inciting criticism. To placate the Liberals, in 1870 Napoleon proposed the establishment of a fully parliamentary legislative regime, which won massive support. The French emperor never had the chance to implement this, however - by the end of the year, the Second Empire had ignominiously collapsed.

Napoleon's distraction with Mexico prevented him from intervening in the Second Schleswig War in 1864 and the Seven Weeks' War in 1866. Both of those conflicts saw Prussia establish itself as the dominant power in Germany. Afterwards, tensions between France and Prussia grew, especially in 1868 when the latter tried to place a Hohenzollern prince on the Spanish throne, which was left vacant by a revolution there.

The Prussian chancellor Otto von Bismarck provoked Napoleon into declaring war on Prussia in July 1870. The French troops were swiftly defeated in the following weeks, and on September 1, the main army, which the emperor himself was with, was trapped at Sedan and forced to surrender. A republic was quickly proclaimed in Paris, but the war was far from over. As it was clear that Prussia would expect territorial concessions, the provisional government vowed to continue resistance. The Prussians laid siege to Paris, and new armies mustered by France failed to alter this situation. The French capital began experiencing severe food shortages, to the extent where even the animals in the zoo were eaten. As the city was being bombarded by Prussian siege guns in January 1871, King William of Prussia was proclaimed Emperor of Germany in the Hall of Mirrors at Versailles. Shortly afterwards, on January 28, 1871, Paris surrendered. The subsequent peace treaty was harsh; France ceded Alsace and Lorraine to Germany and had to pay an indemnity of 5 billion francs. German troops were to remain in the country until it was paid off. Meanwhile, the fallen Napoleon III went into exile in England where he died in 1873.

== Third Republic (from 1870) ==
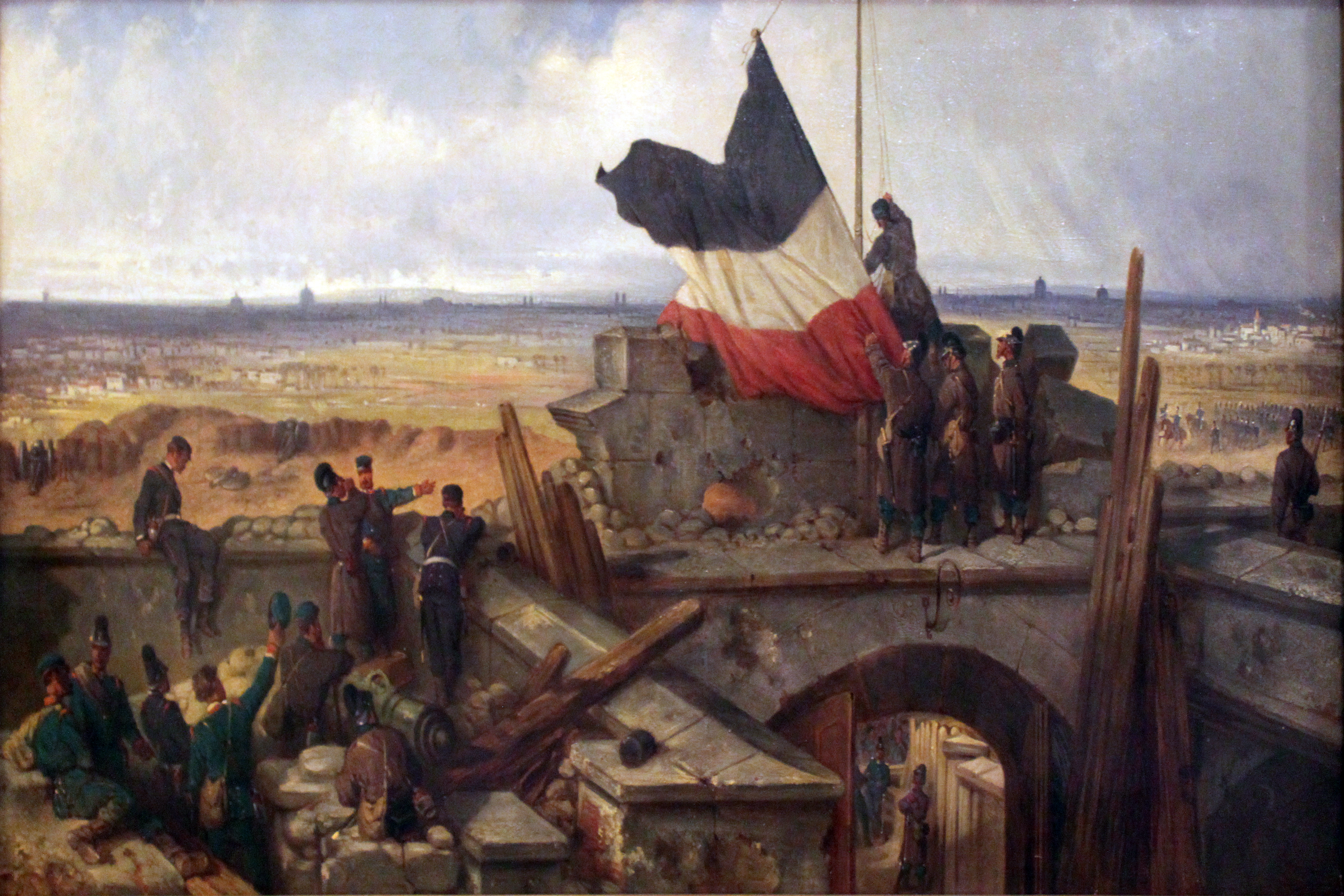
German soldiers pull down the French flag in 1871

The birth of the Third Republic would see France occupied by foreign troops, the capital in a popular socialist insurrection — the Paris Commune — and two provinces (Alsace-Lorraine) annexed to Germany. Feelings of national guilt and a desire for vengeance ("revanchism") would be major preoccupations of the French throughout the next two decades. Yet by 1900, France had resumed many economic and cultural ties with Germany, and few French still dreamed of a "revanche". No French political party even mentioned Alsace-Lorraine any more on its program.

The Third Republic was to last until the military defeat of 1940 (longer than any government in France since the Revolution).

=== Paris Commune (1871) ===
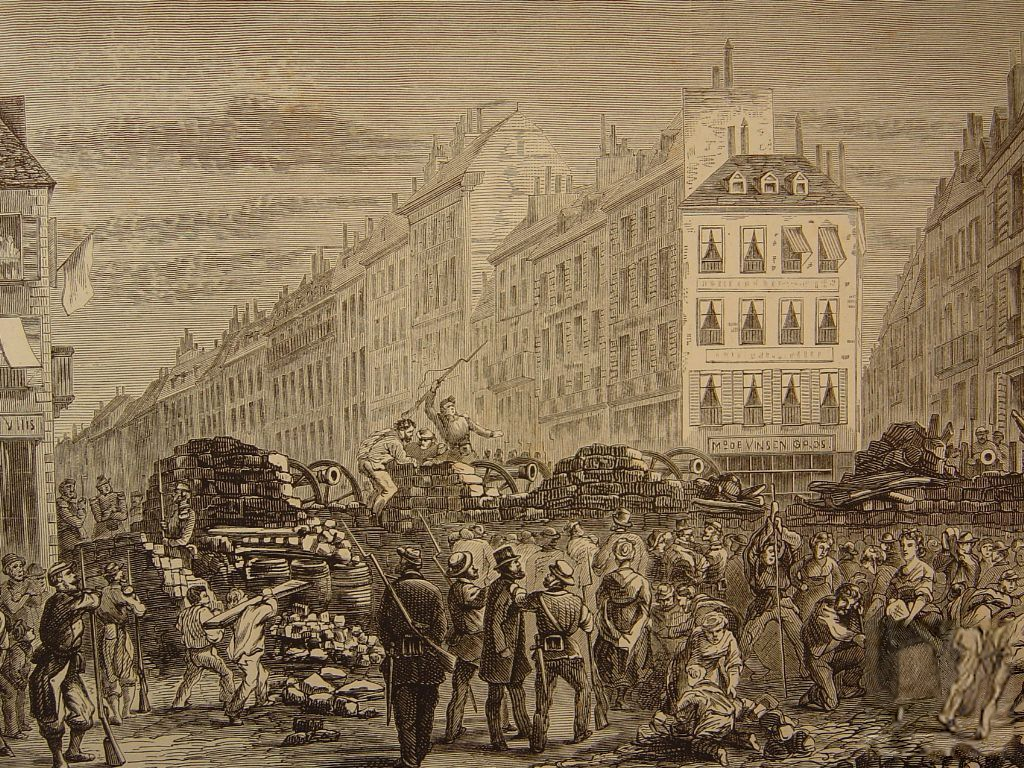
Communards building a barricade in Paris

A revolt broke out on 18 March when radicalised soldiers from the Paris National Guard killed two French generals. French government officials and the army withdrew quickly to Versailles, and a new city council, the Paris Commune, dominated by anarchists and radical socialists, was elected and took power on March 26, and tried to implement an ambitious and radical social programme.

The Commune proposed the separation of Church and state, made all Church property state property, and excluded religious instruction from schools, including Catholic schools. The churches were only allowed to continue their religious activity if they kept their doors open to public political meetings during the evenings. Other projected legislation dealt with educational reforms which would make further education and technical training freely available to all. However, for lack of time and resources, the programs were never carried out. The Vendôme Column, seen as a symbol of Napoleon's imperialism was pulled down, at the suggestion of Commune member Gustave Courbet, who was later briefly jailed and required to pay for putting it back up.

Nathalie Lemel, a religious workwoman, and Elisabeth Dmitrieff, a young Russian aristocrat, created the Union des femmes pour la défense de Paris et les soins aux blessés ("Women Union for the Defense of Paris and Care to the Injured") on April 11, 1871. They demanded gender equality, wage equality, right of divorce for women, right to laïque instruction (non-clerical) and for professional training for girls. They also demanded suppression of the distinction between married women and concubins, between legitimate and natural children, the abolition of prostitution—they obtained the closing of the maisons de tolérance (legal unofficial brothels). The Women Union also participated in several municipal commissions and organized cooperative workshops.

The Paris Commune held power for only two months. Between May 21 and 28 the French army reconquered the city in bitter fighting, in what became known as "la semaine sanglante" or "bloody week". During the street fighting, the Communards were outnumbered four or five to one; they lacked competent officers; and they had no plan for the defence of the city, so each neighbourhood was left to defend itself. Their military commander, Louis Charles Delescluze, committed suicide by dramatically standing atop a barricade on May 26. In the final days of the battle the Communards set fire to the Tuileries Palace, the Hotel de Ville, the Palais de Justice, the Palace of the Legion of Honor, and other prominent government buildings, and executed hostages they had taken, including Georges Darboy, the archbishop of Paris.

Army casualties from the beginning April through Bloody Week amounted to 837 dead and 6,424 wounded. Nearly seven thousand Communards were killed in combat or summarily executed by army firing squads afterwards, and buried in the city cemeteries, and in temporary mass graves. About ten thousand Communards escaped and went into exile in Belgium, England, Switzerland and the United States. Forty-five thousand prisoners were taken after the fall of the Commune. Most were released, but twenty-three were sentenced to death, and about ten thousand were sentenced to prison or deportation to New Caledonia or other prison colonies. All the prisoners and exiles were amnestied in 1879 and 1880, and most returned to France, where some were elected to the National Assembly.

=== Royalist domination (1871–1879) ===
French royal and constitutional flag proposed as a compromise

Thus, the Republic was born of a double defeat: before the Prussians, and of the revolutionary Commune. The repression of the commune was bloody. One hundred forty-seven Communards were executed in front of the Communards' Wall in Père Lachaise Cemetery, while thousands of others were marched to Versailles for trials. The number killed during La Semaine Sanglante (The Bloody Week) had been estimated by some sources as high as twenty thousand; recent historians, using research into the number buried in the city cemeteries and exhumed from mass graves, now put the most likely number at between six and seven thousand. Thousands were imprisoned; 7,000 were exiled to New Caledonia. Thousands more fled to Belgium, England, Italy, Spain and the United States. In 1872, "stringent laws were passed that ruled out all possibilities of organizing on the left." For the imprisoned there was a general amnesty in 1880, and many of the Communards returned to France, where some were elected to the Parliament. Paris remained under martial law for five years.

The primary pretenders to the throne

Henri V
(Legitimist)
King for a week in 1830

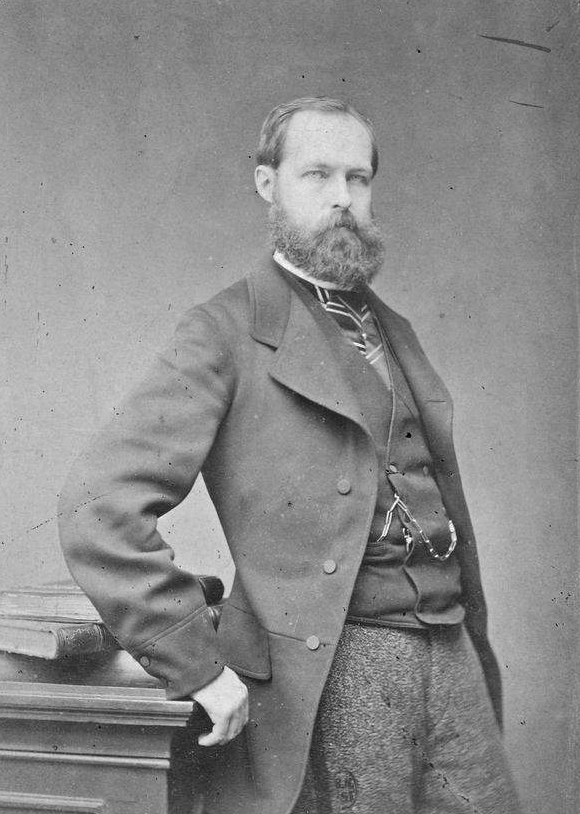
Phillipe VII
(Orléanist)
momentarily King in 1848

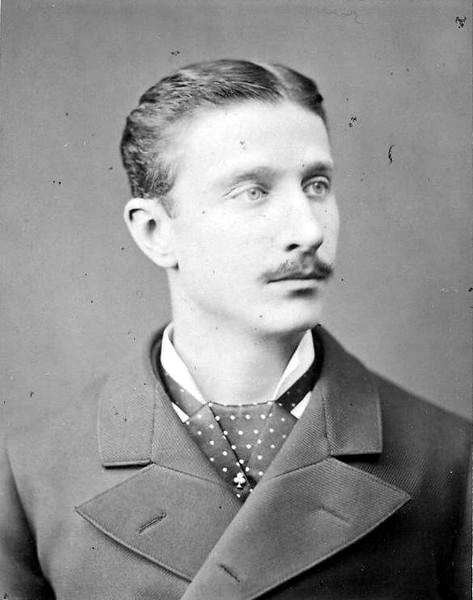
Napoleon IV
(Bonapartist)
momentarily Emperor in 1870

Beside this defeat, the Republican movement also had to confront the counterrevolutionaries who rejected the legacy of the 1789 Revolution. Both the Legitimist and the Orléanist royalists rejected republicanism, which they saw as an extension of modernity and atheism, breaking with France's traditions. This lasted until at least the May 16, 1877 crisis, which finally led to the resignation of royalist Marshal MacMahon in January 1879. The death of Henri, comte de Chambord in 1883, who, as the grandson of Charles X, had refused to abandon the fleur-de-lys and the white flag, thus jeopardizing the alliance between Legitimists and Orleanists, convinced many of the remaining Orleanists to rally themselves to the Republic, as Adolphe Thiers had already done. The vast majority of the Legitimists abandoned the political arena or became marginalised, at least until Pétain's Vichy regime. Some of them founded Action Française in 1898, during the Dreyfus affair, which became an influent movement throughout the 1930s, in particular among the intellectuals of Paris' Quartier Latin. In 1891, Pope Leo XIII's encyclical Rerum novarum was incorrectly seen to have legitimised the Social Catholic movement, which in France could be traced back to Hugues Felicité Robert de Lamennais' efforts under the July Monarchy. Pope Pius X later condemned these movements of Catholics for democracy and Socialism in Nostre Charge Apostolique against the Le Síllon movement.

=== "Radicals" (1879–1914) ===
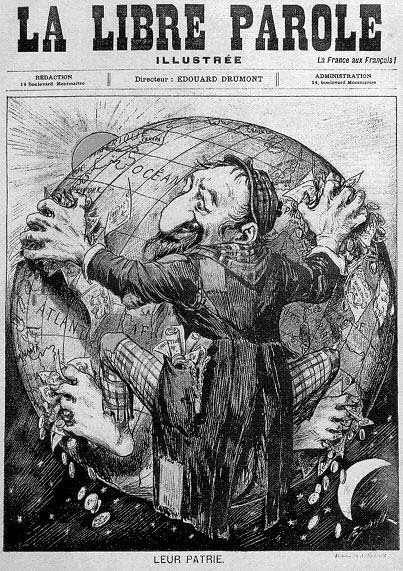
Antisemitic cartoon on the newspaper Libre Parole in 1893

The initial republic was in effect led by pro-royalists, but republicans (the "Radicals") and bonapartists scrambled for power. The period from 1879 to 1899 saw power come into the hands of moderate republicans and former "radicals" (around Léon Gambetta); these were called the "Opportunists" (Républicains opportunistes). The newly found Republican control on the Republic allowed the vote of the 1881 and 1882 Jules Ferry laws on a free, mandatory and secular education.

The moderates however became deeply divided over the Dreyfus affair, and this allowed the Radicals to eventually gain power from 1899 until the Great War. During this period, crises like the potential "Boulangist" coup d'état (see Georges Boulanger) in 1889, showed the fragility of the republic. The Radicals' policies on education (suppression of local languages, compulsory education), mandatory military service, and control of the working classes eliminated internal dissent and regionalisms, while their participation in the Scramble for Africa and in the acquiring of overseas possessions (such as French Indochina) created myths of French greatness. Both of these processes transformed a country of regionalisms into a modern nation state.

In 1880, Jules Guesde and Paul Lafargue, Marx's son-in-law, created the French Workers' Party (Parti ouvrier français, or POF), the first Marxist party in France. Two years later, Paul Brousse's Possibilistes split. A controversy arose in the French socialist movement and in the Second International concerning "socialist participation in a bourgeois government", a theme which was triggered by independent socialist Alexandre Millerand's participation to Radical-Socialist Waldeck-Rousseau's cabinet around the start of the 20th century, which also included the marquis de Galliffet, best known for his role as repressor of the 1871 Commune. While Jules Guesde was opposed to this participation, which he saw as a trick, Jean Jaurès defended it, making him one of the first social-democrats. Guesde's POF united itself in 1902 with the Parti socialiste de France, and finally in 1905 all socialist tendencies, including Jaurès' Parti socialiste français, unified into the Section française de l'Internationale ouvrière (SFIO), the "French section of the Second International", itself formed in 1889 after the split between anarcho-syndicalists and Marxist socialists which led to the dissolving of the First International (founded in London in 1864).

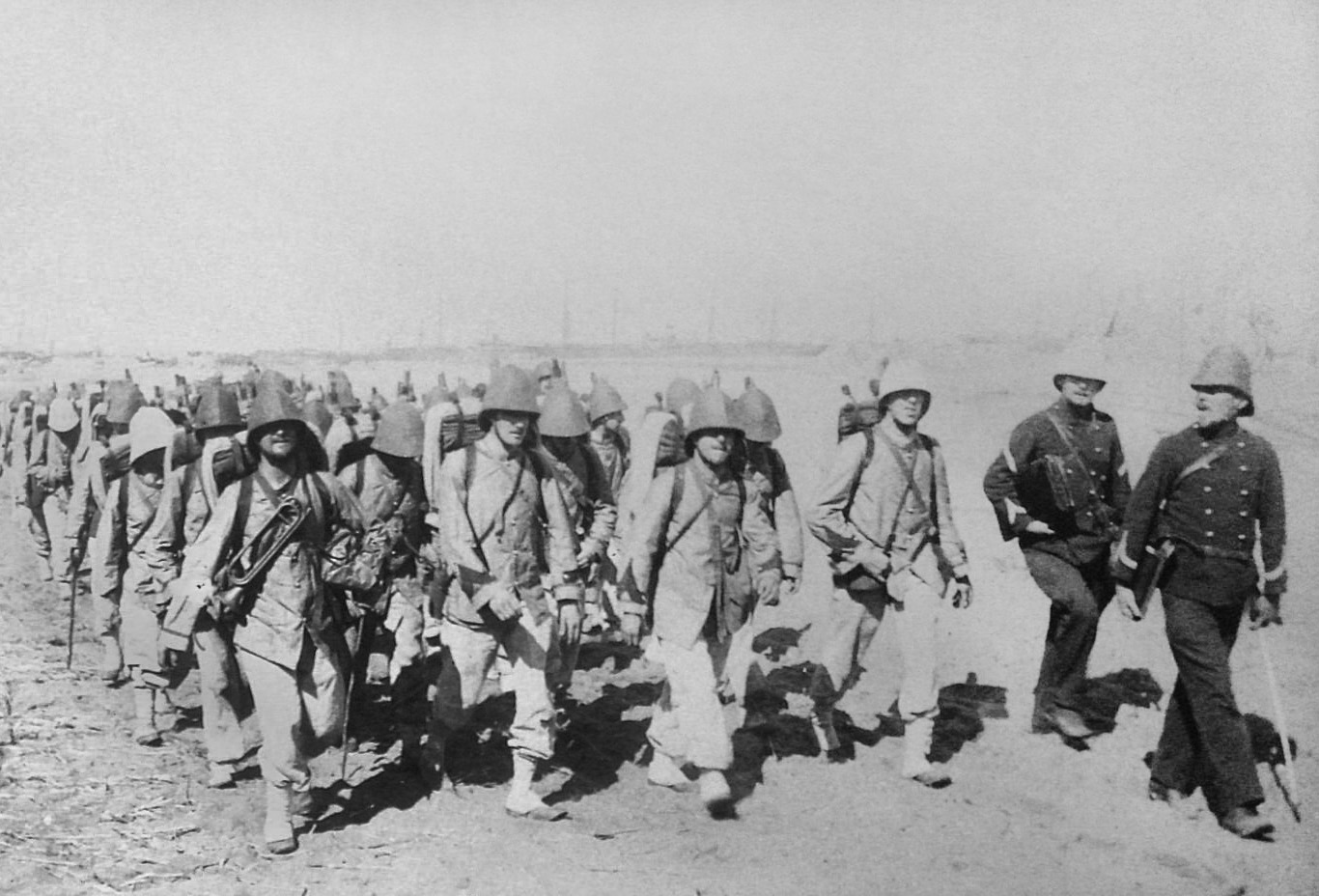
The end of the 19th century saw the spectacular growth of the French empire (French troops landing in Madagascar in 1895).

Bismarck had supported France becoming a republic in 1871, knowing that this would isolate the defeated nation in Europe where most countries were monarchies. In an effort to break this isolation, France went to great pains to woo Russia and the United Kingdom to its side, first by means of the Franco-Russian Alliance of 1894, then the 1904 Entente Cordiale with the U.K, and finally, with the signing of the Anglo-Russian Entente in 1907 this became the Triple Entente, which eventually led France and the UK to enter World War I as Allies when Germany declared war on Russia.

Distrust of Germany, faith in the army and antisemitism in parts of the French public opinion combined to make the Dreyfus affair (the unjust trial and condemnation of a Jewish military officer for treason) a political scandal of the utmost gravity. The nation was divided between "dreyfusards" and "anti-dreyfusards" and far-right Catholic agitators inflamed the situation even when proofs of Dreyfus' innocence came to light. The writer Émile Zola published an impassioned editorial on the injustice, and was himself condemned by the government for libel. Once Dreyfus was finally pardoned, the progressive legislature enacted the 1905 laws on laïcité which created a complete separation of church and state and stripped churches of most of their property rights.

The period and the end of the 19th and the beginning of the 20th century is often termed the Belle Époque. Although associated with cultural innovations and popular amusements (cabaret, cancan, the cinema, new art forms such as Impressionism and Art Nouveau), France was nevertheless a nation divided internally on notions of religion, class, regionalisms and money, and on the international front France came sometimes to the brink of war with the other imperial powers, including Great Britain (the Fashoda Incident). Yet in 1905–1914 the French repeatedly elected left-wing, pacifist parliaments, and French diplomacy took care to settle matters peacefully. France was caught unprepared by the German declaration of war in 1914. The human and financial costs of World War I would be catastrophic for the French.

== Themes ==
=== Colonialism ===
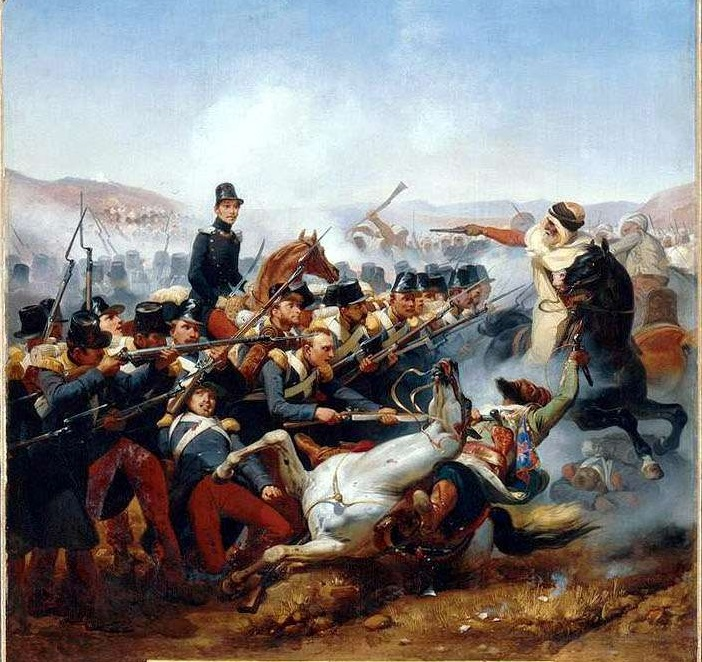
The French conquest of Algeria

Starting with its scattered small holdings in India, West Indies and Latin America, France began rebuilding its world empire. It took control of Algeria in 1830 and began in earnest to rebuild its worldwide empire after 1850, concentrating chiefly in North and West Africa, as well as South-East Asia, with other conquests in Central and East Africa, as well as the South Pacific. Republicans, at first hostile to empire, only became supportive when Germany started to build her own colonial empire In the 1880s. As it developed the new empire took on roles of trade with France, especially supplying raw materials and purchasing manufactured items, as well as lending prestige to the motherland and spreading French civilization and language, and the Catholic religion. It also provided manpower in the World Wars.

It became a moral mission to lift the world up to French standards by bringing Christianity and French culture. In 1884 the leading exponent of colonialism, Jules Ferry declared: "The higher races have a right over the lower races, they have a duty to civilise the inferior races." Full citizenship rights – assimilation – was a long-term goal, but in practice colonial officials were reluctant to extend full citizenship rights. France sent small numbers of white permanent settlers to its empire, in sharp contrast to Britain, Spain and Portugal. The notable exception was Algeria, where the French settlers nonetheless always remained a powerful minority.

==== Africa ====
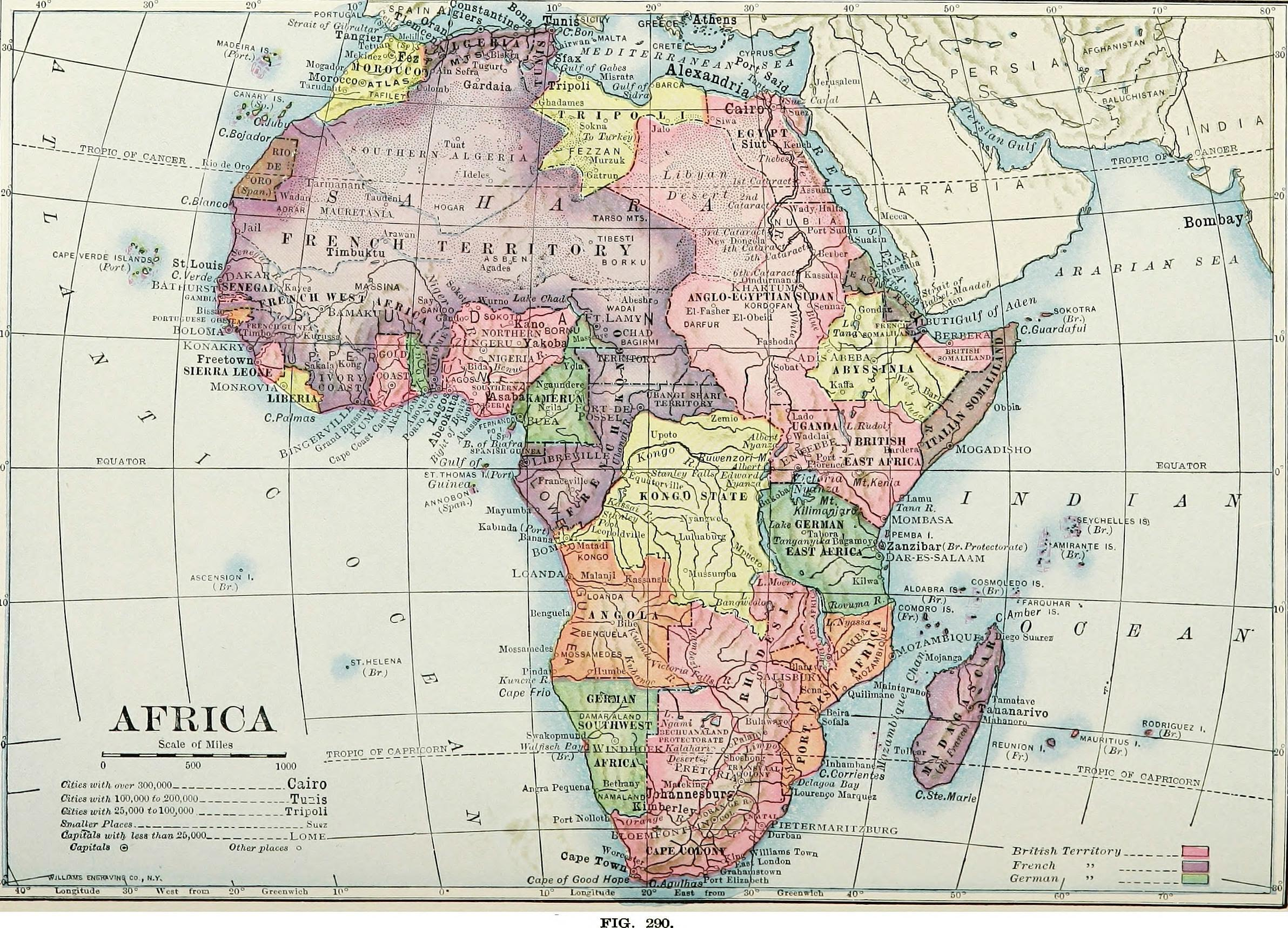
A 1910 map showing the recent consolidation of French control in much of North and West Africa as well as Madagascar

The Suez Canal, initially built by the French, became a joint British-French project in 1875, as both saw it as vital to maintaining their influence and empires in Asia. In 1882, ongoing civil disturbances in Egypt prompted Britain to intervene, extending a hand to France. The government allowed Britain to take effective control of Egypt.

Under the leadership of expansionist Jules Ferry, the Third Republic greatly expanded the French colonial empire. Catholic missionaries played a major role. France acquired Indochina, Madagascar, vast territories in West Africa and Central Africa, and much of Polynesia.

In the early 1880s, Pierre Savorgnan de Brazza was exploring the Kongo Kingdom for France, at the same time Henry Morton Stanley explored it in on behalf of Leopold II of Belgium, who would have it as his personal Congo Free State (see section below). France occupied Tunisia in May 1881. In 1884, France occupied Guinea. French West Africa (AOF) was founded in 1895, and French Equatorial Africa in 1910.

During the Scramble for Africa in the 1870s and 1880s, the British and French generally recognised each other's spheres of influence. The Suez Canal, initially built by the French, became a joint British–French project in 1875, as both saw it as vital to maintaining their influence and empires in Asia. In 1882, ongoing civil disturbances in Egypt (see Urabi Revolt) prompted Britain to intervene, extending a hand to France. France's expansionist Prime Minister Jules Ferry was out of office, and the government was unwilling to send more than an intimidatory fleet to the region. Britain established a protectorate, as France had a year earlier in Tunisia, and popular opinion in France later put this action down to duplicity. It was about this time that the two nations established co-ownership of Vanuatu. The Anglo-French Convention of 1882 was also signed to resolve territory disagreements in western Africa.

===== Fashoda Crisis =====
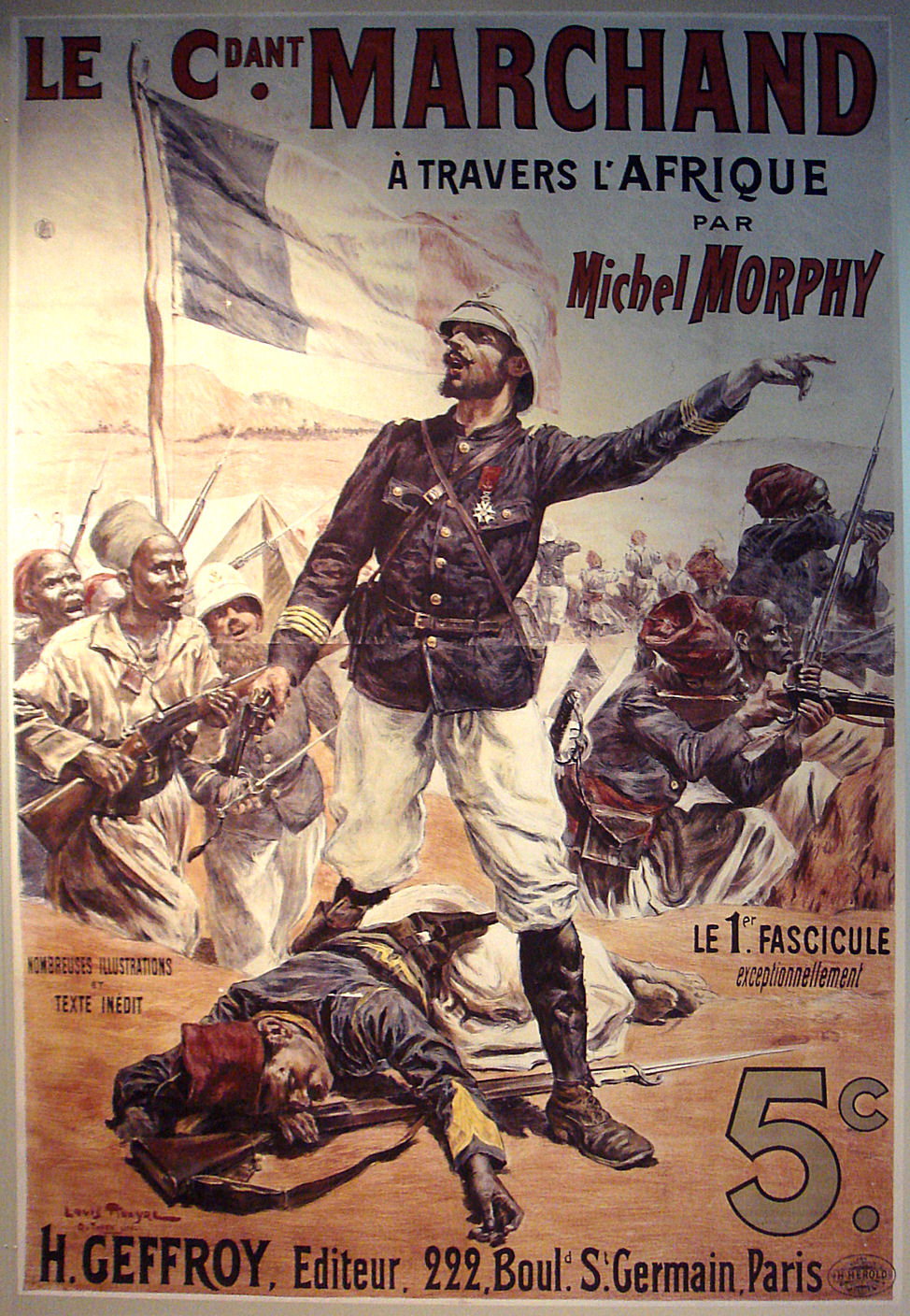
Contemporary illustration of Captain Jean-Baptiste Marchand's trek across Africa

In the 1875–1898 era, serious tensions with Britain erupted over African issues. At several points war was possible, but it never happened. One brief but dangerous dispute occurred during the Fashoda Incident when French troops tried to claim an area in the Southern Sudan, and a British force purporting to be acting in the interests of the Khedive of Egypt arrived. Under heavy pressure the French withdrew securing Anglo-Egyptian control over the area. The status quo was recognised by an agreement between the two states acknowledging British control over Egypt, while France became the dominant power in Morocco. Ultimately, the Fashoda incident resulted in a major diplomatic defeat and a national humiliation for France. French nationalists argued the incident was clear evidence that the army had been severely weakened by Dreyfusards, along with claiming that Britain might be preparing to attack France. Meanwhile, Britain relished in its success, although remaining wary of French retaliation.

==== Asia ====
France had colonies in Asia and looked for alliances and found in Japan a possible ally. At Japan's request Paris sent military missions in 1872–1880, in 1884–1889 and in 1918–1919 to help modernise the Japanese army. Conflicts with China over Indochina climaxed during the Sino-French War (1884–1885). Admiral Courbet destroyed the Chinese fleet anchored at Foochow. The treaty ending the war, put France in a protectorate over northern and central Vietnam, which it divided into Tonkin and Annam.

=== Literature ===
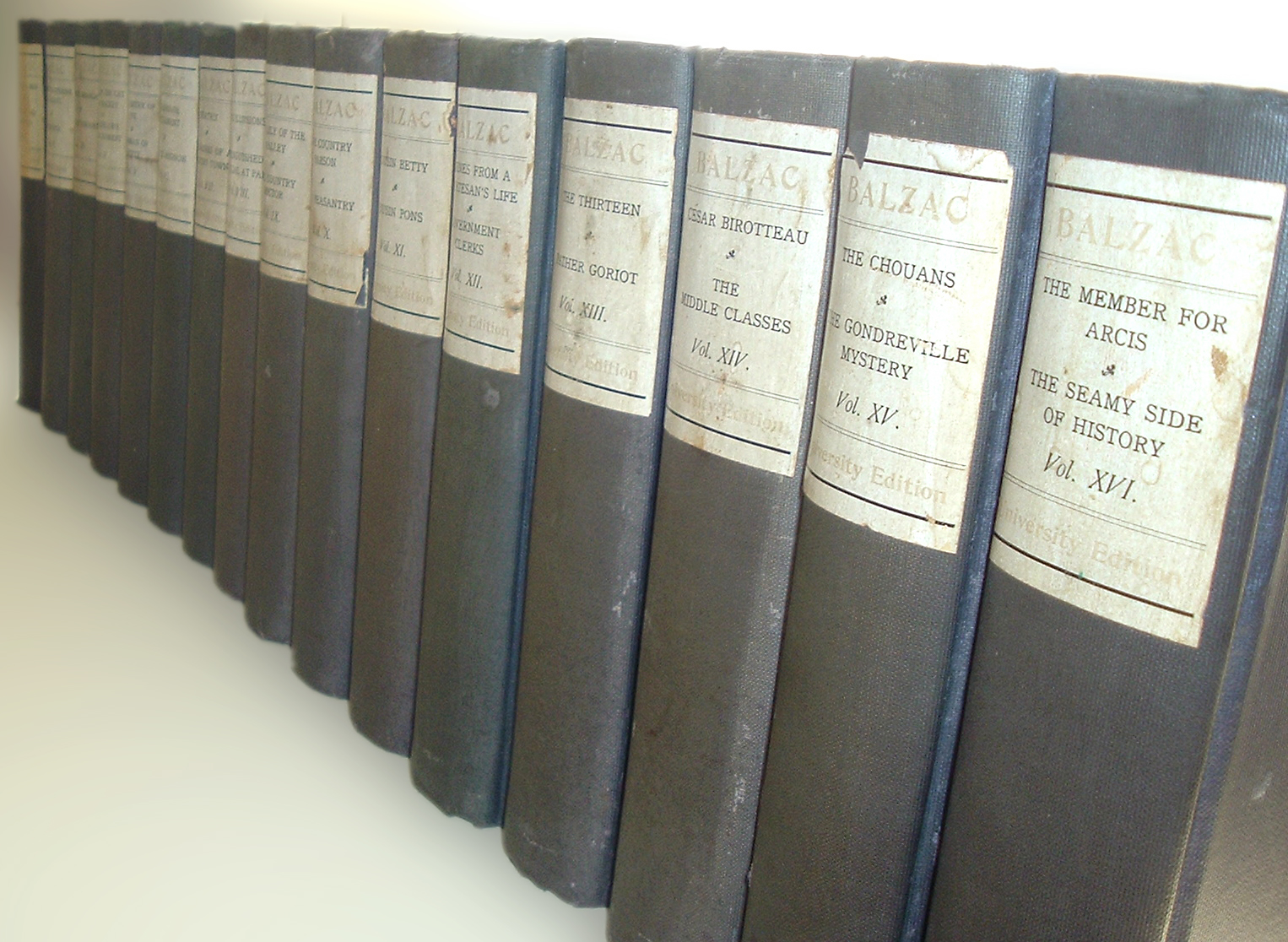
1901 edition of The Works of Honoré de Balzac, including the entire Comédie humaine

France's intellectual climate in the mid to late 19th century was dominated by the so-called "Realist" Movement. The generation that came of age after 1848 rejected what it considered the opulence and tackiness of the Romantic Movement. Realism was in a sense a revival of 18th-century Enlightenment ideas. It favored science and rationality and considered the Church an obstruction to human progress. The movement peaked during the Second Empire with writers and artists such as Flaubert and Courbet. After the establishment of the Third Republic, it had coalesced into a unified system of thought known as Positivism, a term coined by the philosopher Auguste Comte. The two most notable writers of the 1870s-80s, Hippolyte Taine and Ernest Renan rejected the Positivist label, but most of their ideas were similar in content. Writers such as Émile Zola and artists like Édouard Manet and Pierre-Auguste Renoir epitomized the spirit of Positivism.

In addition, France produced a large body of prominent scientists during the late 19th century such as Louis Pasteur and Marcellin Berthelot. Social sciences were less well-developed, but Gustave Le Bon and Emile Durkheim were notable figures in this field.

Positivism survived as a movement until at least World War I, but beginning in the 1890s was challenged by a rival school of thought that saw the return of Romantic ideas. A number of artists came to disagree with the cold rationalism and logic of the Positivists, feeling that it ignored human emotions. The so-called Symbolists included the poets Paul Verlaine and Stéphane Mallarmé and an assortment of composers such as Georges Bizet and Camille Saint-Saëns who then gave way to the more experimental music of Claude Debussy and Maurice Ravel.

Symbolist writers and philosophers included Paul Bourget, Maurice Barres, and Henri Bergson plus the painters Paul Cézanne and Paul Gauguin. Bourget denounced Positivist ideas and proclaimed that man's salvation did not come from science, but by the more traditional values of God, family, and country. He espoused what he called "integral nationalism" and that traditional institutions, reverence for one's ancestors, and the sacredness of the French soil were what needed to be taught and promoted. Henri Bergson, whose lectures at the college de France became major social gatherings among Parisians, criticized scientific rationalism and exalted man's irrational drives, especially what he dubbed élan vital, distinguishing heroic men and nations from the plodding masses.

The Symbolist Movement also affected the political climate of the nation: in the syndicalist beliefs of Georges Sorel, in labor activism, and also a resurgent nationalism among French youth in the years immediately preceding World War I. This new spirit brought a revival of belief in the Church and a strong, fervent sense of patriotism. Also a new school of young artists emerged who completely broke with Impressionism and favored a deep, intense subjectivism. Inspired by Cézanne and Gauguin, Georges Braque, Pablo Picasso, Henri Matisse, and Georges Rouault entered the art scene so abruptly that they came to be known as the Fauves (Wild Ones).

=== Art ===
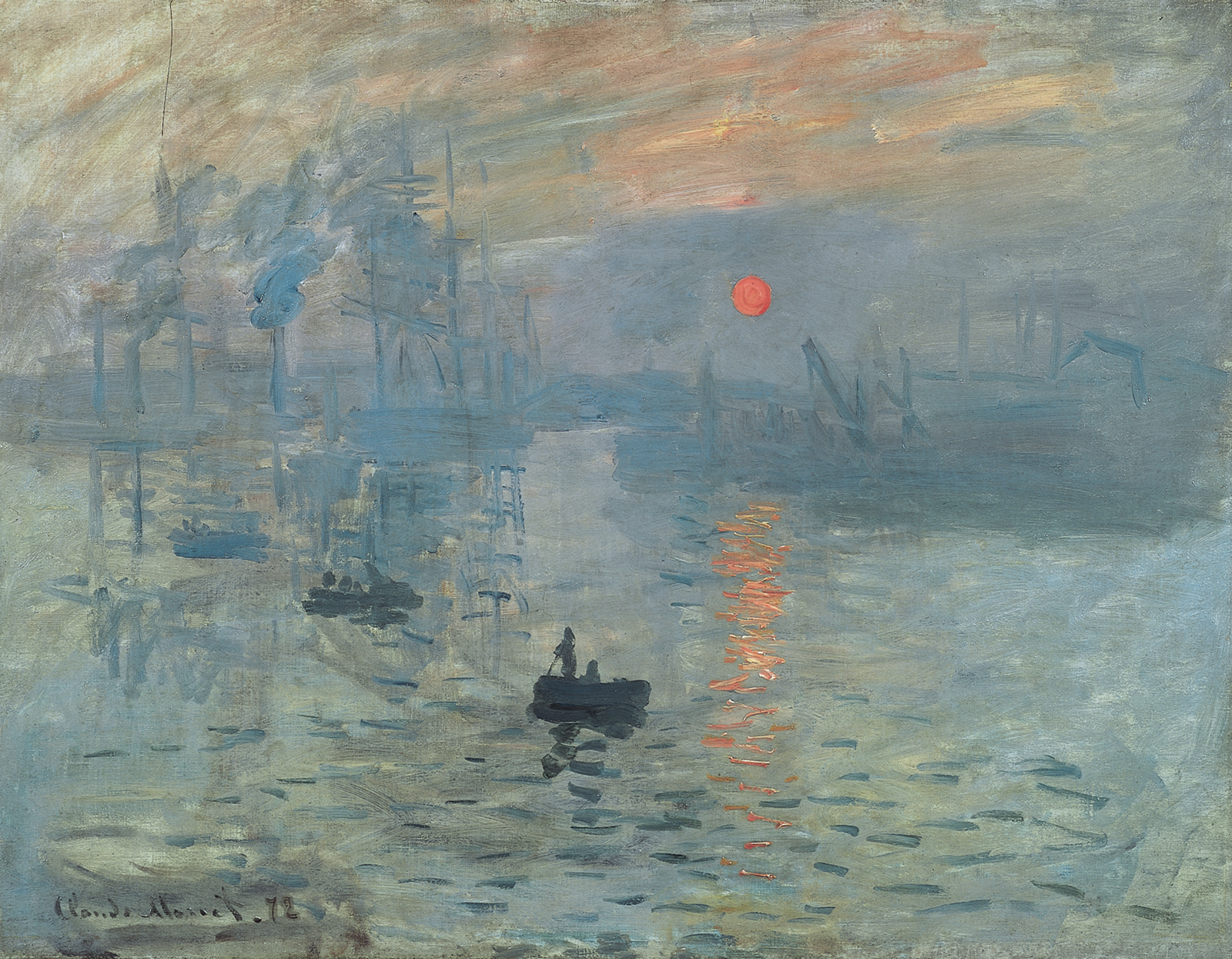
Claude Monet, Impression, soleil levant (Impression, Sunrise), 1872, oil on canvas, Musée Marmottan Monet, Paris. This painting became the source of the movement's name, after Louis Leroy's article The Exhibition of the Impressionists satirically implied that the painting was at most, a sketch.

Romanticism emerged in the early 19th century as a vibrant period in the arts, influenced by the French Revolution and Napoleonic wars. It marked a departure from classicism, embracing Orientalism, tragic anti-heroes, wild landscapes, and themes from the Middle Ages and the Renaissance. This era saw a debate between the proponents of line, exemplified by Jean Auguste Dominique Ingres, and those favoring violent colors and curves, like Eugène Delacroix. Romanticism emphasized a literary language rooted in feelings. It laid the groundwork for later movements, including Naturalism and Symbolism, influencing artists like Gustave Courbet, the Barbizon School, and Gustave Moreau.

The birth of Modernism in the late 19th century, centered in Paris, was marked by artistic innovation across domains including music, dance, architecture, and literature. It was characterized by the dynamism of café culture, the impact of Haussmannization on the cityscape, and a blend of social classes and radical art movements. Édouard Manet's work bridged 19th-century art with modernism, leading the way to Impressionism. Claude Monet and his contemporaries advanced this movement by capturing transient light effects outdoors, inspired partly by J.M.W. Turner and the advent of paint in tubes.

Impressionism set the stage for further experimentation. Vincent van Gogh introduced expressionism; Georges Seurat developed pointillism; Paul Cézanne explored geometric perceptions; Paul Gauguin sought symbolism and primitivism in exotic locales; and Henri Rousseau exemplified naïve art. This era of artistic exploration laid the foundations for many modern art movements, reflecting a continuous dialogue between past traditions and innovative techniques, including the emerging influence of photography. Many of the developments in French arts in this period parallel changes in 19th-century French literature.

== See also ==
- Palace of Versailles
- Paris in the 18th century
- French Canada
- Québécois people
- Saint-Domingue
- Saint Dominicans
- Haiti
- French Haitians
- Slavery in Saint-Domingue
- Haitian Creole French
- Afro-Haitians
- Americans in Haiti
- Cap-Français
- French India
- Louisiana (New France)
- Louisiana Creole people
- French Revolution
- United States and the Haitian Revolution
- French Revolutionary Wars
- Maximilien Robespierre
- Empress Joséphine
- Jean-Baptiste Le Moyne, Sieur de Bienville
- African Americans in France
- Paris under Napoleon
- Paris during the Restoration
- Paris during the Second Empire
- Paris in the Belle Époque
- French Algeria
- French language in Algeria
- French protectorate of Tunisia
- French Somaliland
- French Indochina
- French West Africa
- French people in Senegal
- French Madagascar
- French Equatorial Africa
- French protectorate in Morocco
- French language in Morocco

== Works cited ==
- "Women and the Commune". L'Humanité (in French). 19 March 2005. Archived from the original on 12 March 2007.
- Aldrich, Robert (1996). Greater France: A History of French Overseas Expansion.
- Anderson, Benedict (July–August 2004). "In the world-shadow of Bismarck and Nobel". New Left Review. II (28).
- Artz, Frederick (1931). France Under the Bourbon Restoration, 1814–1830. Russell & Russell.
- Bell, P. M. H. (2014). France and Britain, 1900-1940: Entente and Estrangement. Routledge. ISBN 978-1-3178-9273-1.
- Betros, Gemma (2010). "The French Revolution and the Catholic Church". History Review (68).
- Brogan, D.W. (1940). France under the Republic: The Development of Modern France (1870-1939).
- Brown, Roger Glenn (1970). Fashoda reconsidered: the impact of domestic politics on French policy in Africa, 1893-1898.
- Caron, Francois (1979). An Economic History of Modern France.
- Chafer, Tony (2002). The End of Empire in French West Africa: France's Successful Decolonization?. Berg. ISBN 978-1-8597-3557-2.
- Cobban, Alfred (1965), "The rise of the third republic", in Cobban, Alfred (ed.), A history of modern France: Volume 3: France of the Republics 1871-1962, Harmondsworth, Middlesex: Penguin Books, ISBN 978-0-1401-3827-6
- Collingham, Hugh; Alexander, Robert S. (1988). The July monarchy: a political history of France, 1830-1848.
- Crouzet, François (1974). "French Economic Growth in the 19th century reconsidered". History. 59 (196). doi:10.1111/j.1468-229X.1974.tb02212.x.
- Diebolt, Claude; Faustine, Perrin (2016). Understanding Demographic Transitions. An Overview of French Historical Statistics. Springer.
- Doyle, William (2002). The Oxford history of the French Revolution. Oxford University Press. ISBN 978-0-1992-5298-5.
- Gottschalk, Louis R. (1929). The Era of the French Revolution (1715–1815).
- Howarth, T.E.B. (1975). Citizen King: Life of Louis-Philippe.
- Langer, William L. (1951). The Diplomacy of Imperialism: 1890-1902.
- Maddison, Angus (1964). Economic Growth in the West.
- Mathews, Shailer (1923). The French Revolution 1789-1815 (2nd ed.). Longmans, Green and Co.
- Okoth, Assa (2006). A History of Africa: African societies and the establishment of colonial rule, 1800-1915. East African Publishers. ISBN 978-9-9662-5357-6.
- Otte, T. G. (2006). "From 'War-in-Sight' to Nearly War: Anglo–French Relations in the Age of High Imperialism, 1875–1898". Diplomacy and Statecraft. 17 (4): 693–714. doi:10.1080/09592290600943064. S2CID 153431025.
- Pakenham, Thomas (1991). The Scramble for Africa: White Man's Conquest of the Dark Continent from 1876 to 1912.
- Pope Pius X (1910). "Letter of Pope Pius X to the French Archbishops and Bishops 1910". the-pope.com. Letter to. Where Peter is, There is the Church.
- Quinn, Frederick (2001). The French Overseas Empire.
- Randell, Keith (1991). France: The Third Republic 1870–1914. Access to History. ISBN 978-0-3405-5569-9.
- Rich, Norman (1992). Great Power Diplomacy: 1814-1914.
- Roberts, Stephen H. (1929). History of French Colonial Policy (1870-1925).
- Rougerie, Jacques. Paris libre- 1871.
- Rougerie, Jacques. La Commune de 1871.
- Spengler, Joseph J. (1938). France Faces Depopulation. Duke University Press. ISBN 978-0-8223-0422-7.
- Stewart, John Hall (1968). The restoration era in France, 1814-1830.
- Taylor, A. J. P. (1954). The Struggle for Mastery in Europe, 1848–1918.
- Tombs, Robert (September 2012). "How bloody was La Semaine Sanglante of 1871? A revision". The Historical Journal. 55 (3): 679–704. doi:10.1017/S0018246X12000222. S2CID 159831886.
- Turner, Barry (26 September 2012). Suez 1956: The Inside Story of the First Oil War. Hodder & Stoughton. ISBN 978-1-4447-6485-7.
- Wakeman Jr., Frederic (1975). The Fall of Imperial China.
- Weber, Eugen (1976). Peasants into Frenchmen: The Modernization of Rural France, 1870-1914.
