= Chairman of the Council of Ministers (France) =

Former head of government in France

President of the Council
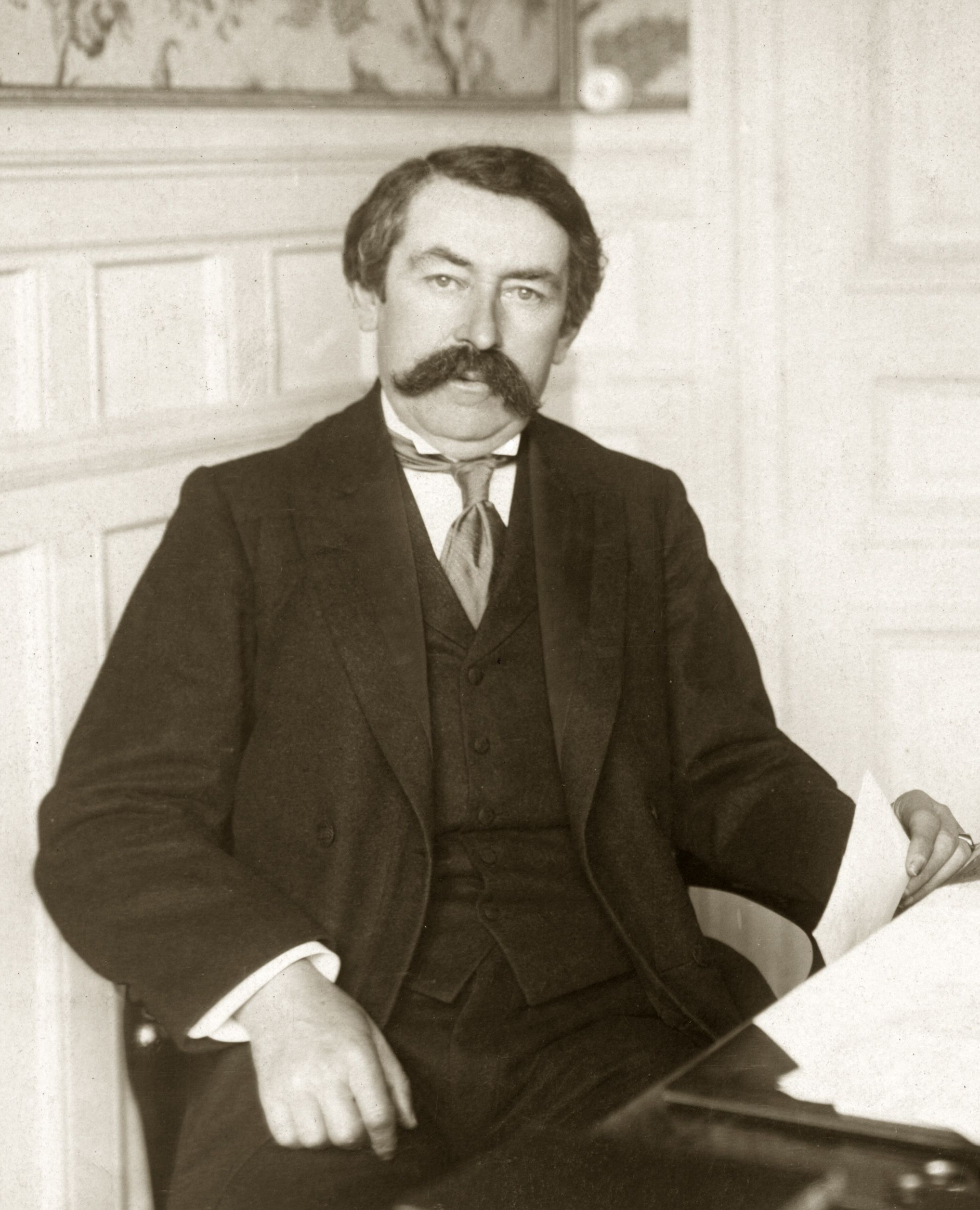
- Aristide Briand, President of the Council eleven times between 1909 and 1929.
- Residence: Hôtel Matignon (from 1934)
- Formation: 9 July 1815
- First holder: Charles-Maurice de Talleyrand-Périgord
- Final holder: Charles de Gaulle
- Abolished: 8 January 1959
- Deputy: List of prime ministers of France

In France, the President of the Council, officially President of the Council of Ministers, was the head of government under several political regimes of the 19th and 20th centuries. Since the establishment of the Fifth Republic, the role of head of government has been fulfilled by the Prime Minister (Article 21 of the Constitution of 4 October 1958).

== History ==
This title was first held by Talleyrand in 1815 during the Restoration. Constitutionally, it is the King who presides over the Council of Ministers: the minister "President of the Council" replaces him when necessary. In practice, he already played a leading role, as Louis XVIII declared in a letter to Decazes in 1821:

It is not the King who is the keystone. It is the President of the Council.

The record for longevity in this position (9 years, 3 months, and 17 days – of which 6 years, 10 months, and 20 days were continuous) is held by Jean-de-Dieu Soult, who headed the government three times under the July Monarchy.

The first President of the Council of the Third Republic was Jules Dufaure in 1876. From 1871 to 1876, the head of government held the title of Vice-President of the Council, with the Council presided over by the President of the Republic (Adolphe Thiers, then Marshal Mac Mahon). The legislative elections of 1876 led to a political crisis between the government and the President of the Republic. The position of President of the Council was then created. It was not official, as the constitutional laws of the Third Republic granted all executive power to the President of the Republic. Curiously, it was the latter who continued to preside over the Council of Ministers held at the Élysée Palace, while another government member held the title of "President of the Council of Ministers" and guided the discussions. Until 1934, the President of the Council had to combine government leadership with another ministerial portfolio, as, being the "unofficial" head of government, he had neither offices nor staff. The President of the Council presented to the President of the Republic a list of ministers from parties that formed a coalition for the occasion (the program was rather brief). This coalition remained fragile, vulnerable to the defection of one of its components over a specific aspect of government policy. The ministry then appeared before the Chamber of Deputies and the Senate, which voted to grant it confidence. The Constitution of 1946 formalized the creation of a President of the Council vested with executive power but still specified that "the President of the Republic presides over the Council of Ministers." The Constitution of 1958 clearly expressed the primacy of the President of the Republic by assigning the title of Prime Minister to the head of government and reserving the presidency of the Council of Ministers to the President of the Republic.

Under the Vichy regime, the head of government was called Vice-President of the Council and later simply Head of Government, with the presidency of the Council of Ministers held by the head of state.

The title of Vice-President of the Council was again given from 1926 to 1958 to certain prominent ministers.

== List of Chairmen of the Council in France ==
President	Government term	Start	End	Duration
Restoration (1815–1830)
Louis XVIII and Charles X, Kings of France
Charles-Maurice de Talleyrand-Périgord	1st term	9 July 1815	26 September 1815	79 days
Armand-Emmanuel, Duke of Richelieu	1st term	26 September 1815	29 December 1818	1190 days
Jean-Joseph, Marquis Dessolles	1st term	29 December 1818	19 November 1819	325 days
Élie, Duke Decazes	1st term	19 November 1819	20 February 1820	93 days
Armand-Emmanuel, Duke of Richelieu	2nd term	20 February 1820	14 December 1821	663 days
Joseph, Count de Villèle	1st term	14 December 1821	4 January 1828	2212 days
Jean-Baptiste, Viscount of Martignac	1st term	4 January 1828	8 August 1829	582 days
Jules, Count de Polignac	1st term	8 August 1829	28 July 1830	354 days
Casimir-Louis-Victurnien, Duke de Mortemart	1st term	29 July 1830	30 July 1830	1 days
July Monarchy (1830–1848)
Louis-Philippe I, King of the French
Jacques Laffitte	1st term	2 November 1830	13 March 1831	131 days
Casimir Perier	1st term	13 March 1831	16 May 1832	430 days
Jean-de-Dieu Soult, Duke of Dalmatia	1st term	11 October 1832	18 July 1834	645 days
Étienne Maurice, Count Gérard	1st term	18 July 1834	10 November 1834	115 days
Hugues-Bernard Maret, Duke of Bassano	1st term	10 November 1834	18 November 1834	8 days
Édouard Mortier, Duke of Treviso	1st term	18 November 1834	12 March 1835	114 days
Achille-Charles-Victor, Duke de Broglie	1st term	12 March 1835	22 February 1836	347 days
Adolphe Thiers	1st term	22 February 1836	6 September 1836	197 days
Louis, Count Molé	1st term and 2nd term	6 September 1836	31 March 1839	936 days
Jean-de-Dieu Soult, Duke of Dalmatia	2nd term	12 May 1839	1 March 1840	294 days
Adolphe Thiers	2nd term	1 March 1840	29 October 1840	242 days
Jean-de-Dieu Soult, Duke of Dalmatia	3rd term	29 October 1840	18 September 1847	2515 days
François Guizot	1st term	18 September 1847	24 February 1848	159 days
Louis, Count Molé	Aborted	24 February 1848	24 February 1848	0 days
Adolphe Thiers	Aborted	24 February 1848	24 February 1848	0 days
Second Republic (24 February 1848 – 2 December 1852)
Provisional Government of 1848
Jacques Charles Dupont de l'Eure	1st term	24 February 1848	9 May 1848	75 days
Constituent Assembly
Louis Eugène Cavaignac	1st term	28 June 1848	20 December 1848	175 days
Louis-Napoléon Bonaparte, President from 20 December 1848 to 2 December 1852
Odilon Barrot	1st term and 2nd term	20 December 1848	31 October 1849	315 days
Alphonse Henri d'Hautpoul (de facto)	1st term	31 October 1849	24 January 1851	450 days
Léon Faucher (de facto)	1st term	10 April 1851	26 October 1851	199 days
Louis-Napoléon Bonaparte (de facto)	Last cabinet	26 October 1851	2 December 1851	37 days
Third Republic (4 September 1870 – 10 July 1940)
Adolphe Thiers, President from 31 August 1871 to 24 May 1873
Jules Dufaure (Vice-President of the Council)	1st term	19 February 1871	18 May 1873	819 days
Jules Dufaure (Vice-President of the Council)	2nd term	18 May 1873	24 May 1873	6 days
Marshal Mac Mahon, President from 24 May 1873 to 30 January 1879
Albert de Broglie, Duke de Broglie (Vice-President of the Council)	1st term	24 May 1873	24 November 1873	184 days
Albert de Broglie, Duke de Broglie (Vice-President of the Council)	2nd term	26 November 1873	18 May 1874	173 days
Ernest Courtot de Cissey (Vice-President of the Council)	1st term	22 May 1874	10 March 1875	292 days
Louis Buffet (Vice-President of the Council)	1st term	10 March 1875	23 February 1876	350 days
Jules Dufaure (Vice-President of the Council)	3rd term	23 February 1876	9 March 1876	15 days
Jules Dufaure (1st President of the Council)	4th term	9 March 1876	2 December 1876	268 days
Jules Simon	1st term	12 December 1876	16 May 1877	155 days
Albert de Broglie, Duke de Broglie	3rd term	17 May 1877	19 November 1877	186 days
Gaëtan de Rochebouët	1st term	23 November 1877	24 November 1877	1 days
Jules Dufaure	4th term	13 December 1877	30 January 1879	413 days
Jules Grévy, President from 30 January 1879 to 2 December 1887
William Waddington	1st term	4 February 1879	21 December 1879	320 days
Charles de Freycinet	1st term	28 December 1879	19 September 1880	266 days
Jules Ferry	1st term	23 September 1880	10 November 1881	413 days
Léon Gambetta	1st term	14 November 1881	26 January 1882	73 days
Charles de Freycinet	2nd term	30 January 1882	29 July 1882	180 days
Charles Duclerc	1st term	7 August 1882	28 January 1883	174 days
Armand Fallières	1st term	29 January 1883	17 February 1883	19 days
Jules Ferry	2nd term	21 February 1883	30 March 1885	768 days
Henri Brisson	1st term	6 April 1885	29 December 1885	267 days
Charles de Freycinet	3rd term	7 January 1886	3 December 1886	330 days
René Goblet	1st term	11 December 1886	17 May 1887	157 days
Maurice Rouvier	1st term	30 May 1887	4 December 1887	188 days
Sadi Carnot, President from 3 December 1887 to 25 June 1894, assassinated
Pierre Tirard	1st term	11 December 1887	30 March 1888	110 days
Charles Floquet	1st term	3 April 1888	14 February 1889	317 days
Pierre Tirard	2nd term	22 February 1889	13 March 1890	384 days
Charles de Freycinet	4th term	17 March 1890	18 February 1892	703 days
Émile Loubet	1st term	27 February 1892	28 November 1892	275 days
Alexandre Ribot	1st term	6 December 1892	10 January 1893	35 days
Alexandre Ribot	2nd term	11 January 1893	30 March 1893	78 days
Charles Dupuy	1st term	4 April 1893	23 November 1893	233 days
Jean Casimir-Perier	1st term	3 December 1893	22 May 1894	170 days
Charles Dupuy	2nd term	30 May 1894	25 June 1894	26 days
Jean Casimir-Perier, President from 27 June 1894 to 16 January 1895
Charles Dupuy	3rd term	1 July 1894	15 January 1895	198 days
Félix Faure, President from 17 January 1895 to 16 February 1899
Alexandre Ribot	3rd term	26 January 1895	28 October 1895	275 days
Léon Bourgeois	1st term	1 November 1895	23 April 1896	174 days
Jules Méline	1st term	28 April 1896	28 June 1898	791 days
Henri Brisson	2nd term	28 June 1898	26 October 1898	120 days
Charles Dupuy	4th term	1 November 1898	18 February 1899	109 days
Émile Loubet, President from 18 February 1899 to 18 February 1906
Charles Dupuy	5th term	18 February 1899	12 June 1899	114 days
Pierre Waldeck-Rousseau	1st term	22 June 1899	3 June 1902	1076 days
Émile Combes	1st term	7 June 1902	1 January 1905	939 days
Maurice Rouvier	2nd term	24 January 1905	18 February 1906	390 days
Armand Fallières, President from 18 February 1906 to 18 February 1913
Maurice Rouvier	3rd term	18 February 1906	7 March 1906	17 days
Ferdinand Sarrien	1st term	14 March 1906	20 October 1906	220 days
Georges Clemenceau	1st term	25 October 1906	20 July 1909	999 days
Aristide Briand	1st term	24 July 1909	2 November 1910	466 days
Aristide Briand	2nd term	4 November 1910	27 February 1911	115 days
Ernest Monis	1st term	2 March 1911	23 June 1911	113 days
Joseph Caillaux	1st term	27 June 1911	11 January 1912	198 days
Raymond Poincaré	1st term	14 January 1912	21 January 1913	373 days
Aristide Briand	3rd term	21 January 1913	18 February 1913	28 days
Raymond Poincaré, President from 18 February 1913 to 18 February 1920
Aristide Briand	4th term	18 February 1913	18 March 1913	28 days
Louis Barthou	1st term	22 March 1913	2 December 1913	255 days
Gaston Doumergue	1st term	9 December 1913	2 June 1914	175 days
Alexandre Ribot	4th term	9 June 1914	12 June 1914	3 days
René Viviani	1st term	13 June 1914	26 July 1914	43 days
René Viviani	2nd term	26 July 1914	29 October 1915	460 days
Aristide Briand	5th term	29 October 1915	12 December 1916	410 days
Aristide Briand	6th term	12 December 1916	17 March 1917	95 days
Alexandre Ribot	5th term	20 March 1917	7 September 1917	171 days
Paul Painlevé	1st term	12 September 1917	13 November 1917	62 days
Georges Clemenceau	2nd term	16 November 1917	18 January 1920	793 days
Alexandre Millerand	2nd term	20 January 1920	18 February 1920	29 days
Paul Deschanel, President from 18 February 1920 to 21 September 1920
Alexandre Millerand	2nd term	18 February 1920	23 September 1920	218 days
Alexandre Millerand, President from 23 September 1920 to 11 June 1924
Georges Leygues	1st term	24 September 1920	12 January 1921	110 days
Aristide Briand	7th term	16 January 1921	12 January 1922	361 days
Raymond Poincaré	2nd term	15 January 1922	29 March 1924	804 days
Raymond Poincaré	3rd term	29 March 1924	1 June 1924	64 days
Frédéric François-Marsal	1st term	8 June 1924	10 June 1924	2 days
Gaston Doumergue, President from 13 June 1924 to 13 June 1931
Édouard Herriot	1st term	14 June 1924	10 April 1925	300 days
Paul Painlevé	2nd term	17 April 1925	27 October 1925	193 days
Paul Painlevé	3rd term	29 October 1925	22 November 1925	24 days
Aristide Briand	8th term	28 November 1925	6 March 1926	98 days
Aristide Briand	9th term	9 March 1926	15 June 1926	98 days
Aristide Briand	10th term	23 June 1926	17 July 1926	24 days
Édouard Herriot	2nd term	19 July 1926	21 July 1926	2 days
Raymond Poincaré	4th term	23 July 1926	6 November 1928	837 days
Raymond Poincaré	5th term	18 November 1928	26 July 1929	250 days
Aristide Briand	11th term	29 July 1929	22 October 1929	85 days
André Tardieu	1st term	3 November 1929	17 February 1930	106 days
Camille Chautemps	1st term	21 February 1930	25 February 1930	4 days
André Tardieu	2nd term	2 March 1930	4 December 1930	277 days
Théodore Steeg	1st term	13 December 1930	22 January 1931	40 days
Pierre Laval	1st term	27 January 1931	13 June 1931	137 days
Paul Doumer, President from 13 May 1931 to 6 May 1932, assassinated
Pierre Laval	2nd term	13 June 1931	12 January 1932	213 days
Pierre Laval	3rd term	14 January 1932	6 February 1932	23 days
André Tardieu	3rd term	20 February 1932	10 May 1932	80 days
Albert Lebrun, President from 10 May 1932 to 10 July 1940, re-elected
Édouard Herriot	3rd term	3 June 1932	14 December 1932	194 days
Joseph Paul-Boncour	1st term	18 December 1932	28 January 1933	41 days
Édouard Daladier	1st term	31 January 1933	24 October 1933	266 days
Albert Sarraut	1st term	26 October 1933	24 November 1933	29 days
Camille Chautemps	2nd term	26 November 1933	27 January 1934	62 days
Édouard Daladier	2nd term	30 January 1934	7 February 1934	8 days
Gaston Doumergue	2nd term	9 February 1934	8 November 1934	272 days
Pierre-Étienne Flandin	1st term	8 November 1934	31 May 1935	204 days
Fernand Bouisson	1st term	1 June 1935	4 June 1935	3 days
Pierre Laval	4th term	7 June 1935	22 January 1936	229 days
Albert Sarraut	2nd term	24 January 1936	4 June 1936	132 days
Léon Blum	1st term	4 June 1936	21 June 1937	382 days
Camille Chautemps	3rd term	29 June 1937	14 January 1938	199 days
Camille Chautemps	4th term	18 January 1938	10 March 1938	51 days
Léon Blum	2nd term	13 March 1938	8 April 1938	26 days
Édouard Daladier	3rd term	10 April 1938	11 May 1939	396 days
Édouard Daladier	4th term	11 May 1939	13 September 1939	125 days
Édouard Daladier	5th term	13 September 1939	20 March 1940	189 days
Paul Reynaud	1st term	22 March 1940	16 June 1940	86 days
Philippe Pétain	1st term	16 June 1940	11 July 1940	25 days
Vichy Regime (10 July 1940 – 20 August 1944)
Philippe Pétain, Head of the French State from 11 July 1940 to 20 August 1944
Philippe Pétain		11 July 1940	17 April 1942
Pierre Laval (Vice-President of the Council)	5th term	11 July 1940	13 December 1940
Pierre-Étienne Flandin (Vice-President of the Council)	2nd term	14 December 1940	9 February 1941
François Darlan (Vice-President of the Council)	1st term	10 February 1941	17 April 1942
Pierre Laval (Head of Government)	6th term	18 April 1942	17 August 1944
Provisional Governments of the French Republic (3 June 1944 – 27 October 1946)
Charles de Gaulle, President of the Government from 3 June 1944 to 20 January 1946, I and II
Félix Gouin, President of the Government from 26 January 1946 to 12 June 1946, I
Georges Bidault, President of the Government from 24 June 1946 to 16 December 1946, I
Fourth Republic (27 October 1946 – 4 October 1958)
Vincent Auriol, President of the Assembly from 3 December 1946 to 20 January 1947
Léon Blum (President of the Government)	3rd term	16 December 1946	22 January 1947	37 days
Vincent Auriol, President from 16 January 1947 to 16 January 1954
Paul Ramadier	1st term	22 January 1947	19 November 1947	301 days
Robert Schuman	1st term	24 November 1947	19 July 1948	238 days
André Marie	1st term	26 July 1948	28 August 1948	33 days
Robert Schuman	2nd term	5 September 1948	7 September 1948	2 days
Henri Queuille	1st term	11 September 1948	6 October 1949	390 days
Georges Bidault	2nd term	28 October 1949	24 June 1950	239 days
Henri Queuille	2nd term	2 July 1950	4 July 1950	2 days
René Pleven	1st term	13 July 1950	28 February 1951	230 days
Henri Queuille	3rd term	10 March 1951	11 July 1951	123 days
René Pleven	2nd term	11 August 1951	7 January 1952	149 days
Edgar Faure	1st term	20 January 1952	28 February 1952	39 days
Antoine Pinay	1st term	8 March 1952	23 December 1952	290 days
René Mayer	1st term	8 January 1953	28 June 1953	171 days
Joseph Laniel	1st term	28 June 1953	16 January 1954	202 days
René Coty, President from 16 January 1954 to 8 January 1959
Joseph Laniel	2nd term	16 January 1954	12 June 1954	147 days
Pierre Mendès France	1st term	18 June 1954	5 February 1955	232 days
Edgar Faure	2nd term	23 February 1955	23 January 1956	334 days
Guy Mollet	1st term	2 February 1956	21 May 1957	474 days
Maurice Bourgès-Maunoury	1st term	12 June 1957	30 September 1957	110 days
Félix Gaillard	1st term	6 November 1957	18 April 1958	163 days
Pierre Pflimlin	1st term	14 May 1958	28 May 1958	14 days
Charles de Gaulle	3rd term	1 June 1958	8 January 1959	221 days

== See also ==
- List of prime ministers of France
- Prime Minister of France

== Bibliography ==
- "Loi du 24 décembre 1934" [Law of 24 December 1934]. Journal Officiel de la République Française (in French): 12701. 25 December 1934. approving the agreement signed on 24 November 1934 between the state and the Office des biens et intérêts privés, relating to the state's waiver of the rights held by the Office over the Hôtel Matignon and the regulation of the works necessary for the installation of the services of the presidency of the council.
