= Second ministry of Armand-Emmanuel du Plessis de Richelieu =

- Cabinet of France

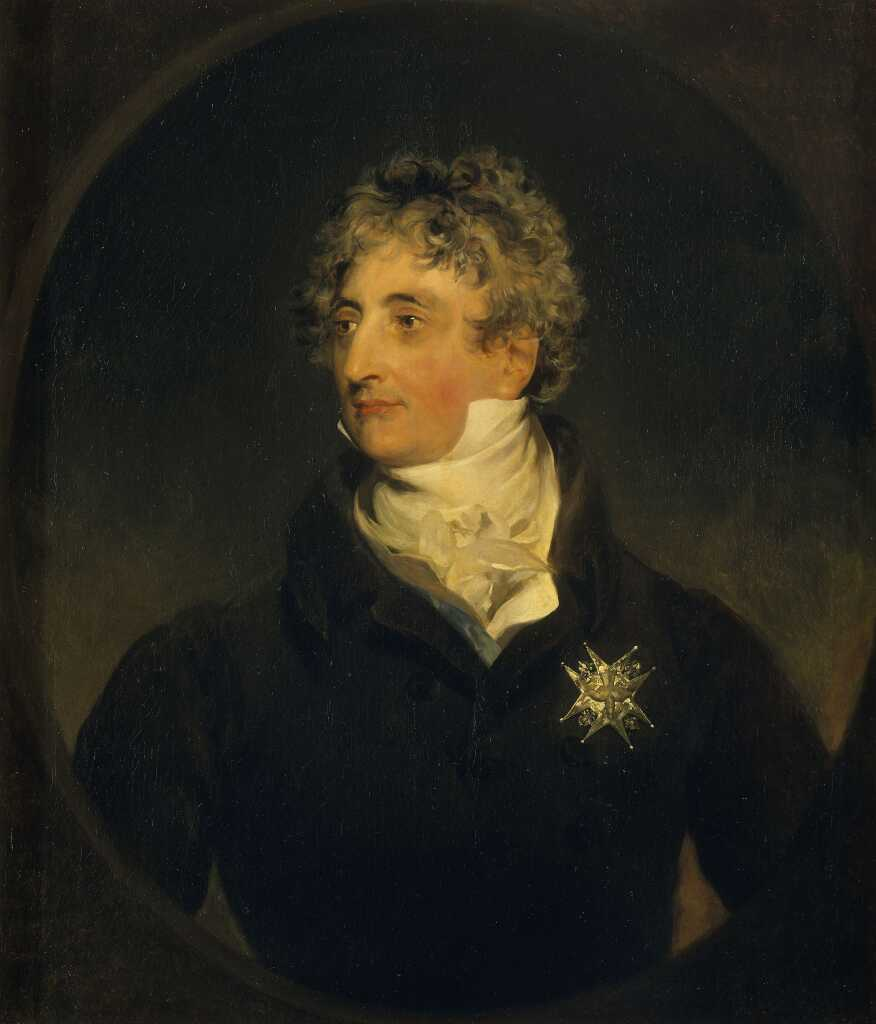
- Armand-Emmanuel du Plessis de Richelieu
- Date formed: 20 February 1820
- Date dissolved: 12 December 1821

People and organisations
- Head of state: Louis XVIII
- Head of government: Armand-Emmanuel du Plessis de Richelieu

History
- Predecessor: Ministry of Élie Decazes
- Successor: Ministry of Joseph de Villèle

The second ministry of Armand-Emmanuel du Plessis de Richelieu was formed on 20 February 1820 after the dismissal of the Ministry of Élie Decazes by King Louis XVIII. It was dissolved on 12 December 1821 and replaced on 14 December 1821 by the Ministry of Joseph de Villèle.

== Ministers ==
Most of the ministers from the previous cabinet remained in place. Élie, duc Decazes was replaced as president of the council by the Duke of Richelieu, who was not given a ministerial portfolio. On the 21 February Joseph Jérôme, Comte Siméon, was appointed Minister of the Interior. The ministers were:

Portfolio	Holder	Party
President of the Council of Ministers	The Duke of Richelieu	None
Ministers
Minister of Foreign Affairs	The Baron Pasquier	Constitutional
Minister of Finance	Antoine Roy	Constitutional
Minister of the Interior	The Count Siméon	None
Minister of Justice	The Count of Serre	Constitutional
Minister of War	General The Marquis of La Tour-Maubourg	None
Minister of the Navy and Colonies	The Baron Portal	None
Minister for the Maison du Roi	Marshal Marquis of Lauriston	Conservative
Ministers without portfolio (Before 14 December 1821)
—	The Count of Corbière	Ultras
—	Joseph Lainé	Constitutional
—	Jean-Baptiste de Villèle	Ultras

== Sources ==
- Muel, Léon (1891). Gouvernements, ministères et constitutions de la France depuis cent ans: Précis historique des révolutions, des crises ministérielles et gouvernementales, et des changements de constitutions de la France depuis 1789 jusqu'en 1890 ... Marchal et Billard.
