= First ministry of Armand-Emmanuel du Plessis de Richelieu =

First Richelieu ministry
- Cabinet of France

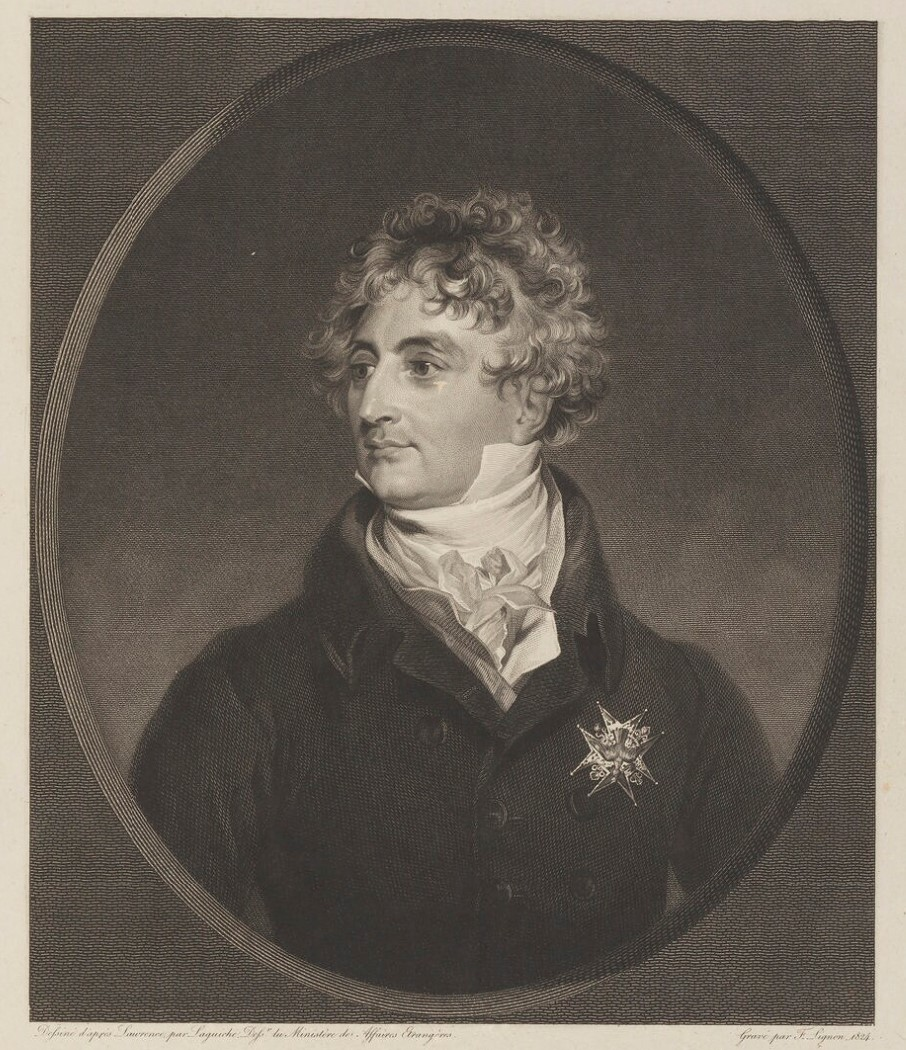
- Armand-Emmanuel du Plessis de Richelieu
- Date formed: 26 September 1815
- Date dissolved: 29 December 1818

People and organisations
- Head of state: Louis XVIII
- Head of government: Armand-Emmanuel du Plessis de Richelieu

History
- Predecessor: Ministry of Charles-Maurice de Talleyrand-Périgord
- Successor: Ministry of Jean-Joseph Dessolles

The First ministry of Armand-Emmanuel du Plessis de Richelieu was formed on 26 September 1815 after the dismissal of the Ministry of Charles-Maurice de Talleyrand-Périgord by King Louis XVIII. It was dissolved on 29 December 1818 and replaced by the Ministry of Jean-Joseph Dessolles.

== Formation and actions ==
After the resignation of Talleyrand, Louis XVIII designated the technocrat Duke of Richelieu to form a cabinet. The minister of the Richelieu ministry were Ultras and counter-revolutionaries hostile to Bonapartism and republicanism, and in the first phase of the ministry they actualized the legal terror called "Second White Terror", that caused the exile, the imprisonment or the execution of several revolutionaries.

After the election held in 1816, the new Parliament, led by a Doctrinaire majority, forced the resignation of several ministers, replaced with Doctrinaires and moderates. The reformed cabinet realised several important laws, like the "Saint-Cyr Law" (abolition of the nobility's privilege in the army) and the "Lainé Law" (expansion of the suffrage and direct votation). However, after the partial-election of 1817, a new Liberal leftist group was formed in the Chamber of Deputies, composed by radicals like General Maximilien Foy and Abbot Henri Grégoire. There was also a rising rivality between Richelieu and his Minister Élie Decazes, a popular Doctrinaire. Finally, at the end of December 1818, Richelieu resigned after he lost the favour of the Ultras and the support of the Doctrinaires.

== Ministers ==
Portfolio	Holder	Party
President of the Council of Ministers	The Duke of Richelieu	None
Ministers
Minister of Foreign Affairs	The Duke of Richelieu	None
Minister of the Interior	The Count of Vaublanc	Ultras
Minister of Justice	The Marquis Barbé-Marbois	None
Minister of War	Marshal Henri Clarke	None
Minister of Finance	Louis-Emmanuel Corvetto	None
Minister of the Navy and Colonies	The Viscount Dubouchage	None
Minister of Police	Élie Decazes	Constitutional

== Changes ==
On 7 May 1816:

Portfolio	Holder	Party
Minister of the Interior	Joseph Lainé	Constitutional
Minister of Justice	Charles Dambray	None

On 19 January 1817:

Portfolio	Holder	Party
Minister of Justice	The Baron Pasquier	Constitutional

On 23 June 1817:

Portfolio	Holder	Party
Minister of the Navy and Colonies	Marshal Marquis of Saint-Cyr	None

On 12 September 1817:

Portfolio	Holder	Party
Minister of War	Marshal Marquis of Saint-Cyr	None
Minister of the Navy and Colonies	Louis-Mathieu Molé	Constitutional

On 7 December 1818:

Portfolio	Holder	Party
Minister of Finance	Antoine Roy	Constitutional

== Sources ==
- Muel, Léon (1891). Gouvernements, ministères et constitutions de la France depuis cent ans: Précis historique des révolutions, des crises ministérielles et gouvernementales, et des changements de constitutions de la France depuis 1789 jusqu'en 1890 ... Marchal et Billard.
- Robert, Adolphe; Cougny, Gaston (1891). "Charles, Henry DAMBRAY". Dictionnaire des parlementaires français de 1789 à 1889.
