= Ministry of Élie Decazes =

French government ministry from 1819–1820

- Cabinet of France

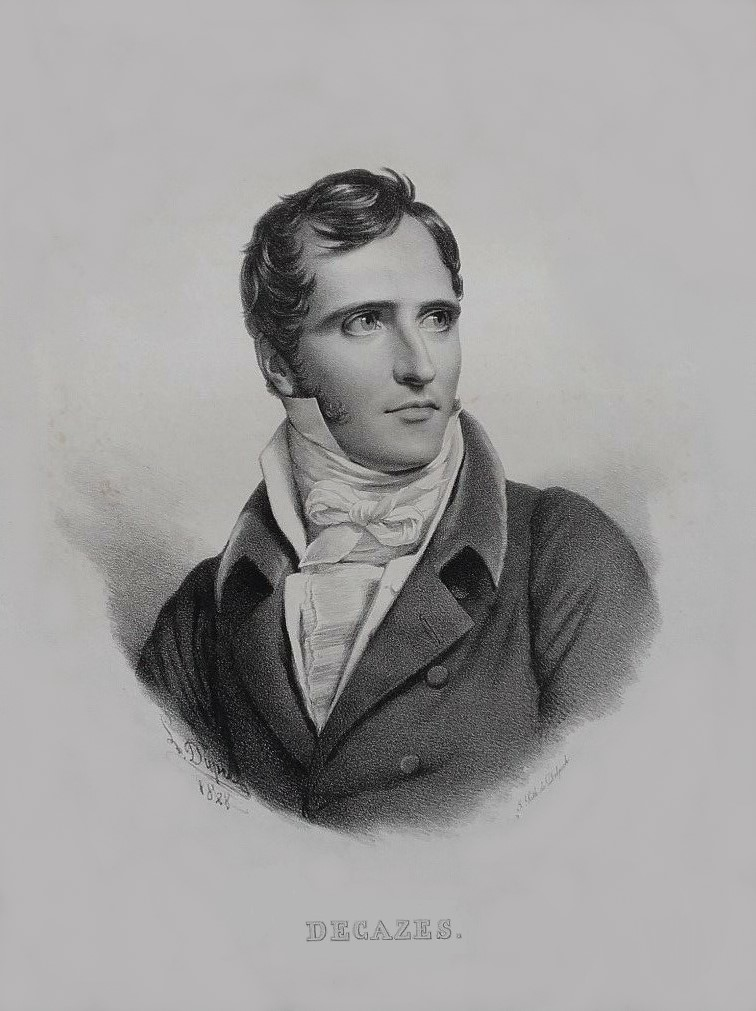
- Élie, duc Decazes
- Date formed: 19 November 1819
- Date dissolved: 17 February 1820

People and organisations
- Head of state: Louis XVIII
- Head of government: Élie, duc Decazes

History
- Predecessor: Ministry of Jean-Joseph Dessolles
- Successor: Second ministry of Armand-Emmanuel du Plessis de Richelieu

The Ministry of Élie Decazes was formed on 19 November 1819 after the dismissal of the Ministry of Jean-Joseph Dessolles by King Louis XVIII. It was dissolved on 17 February 1820 and replaced on 20 February 1820 by the Second ministry of Armand-Emmanuel du Plessis de Richelieu.

== Ministers ==
The ministers were:

Portfolio	Holder	Party
President of the Council of Ministers	The Count Decazes	Constitutional
Ministers
Minister of the Interior	The Count Decazes	Constitutional
Minister of Justice	The Count of Serre	Constitutional
Minister of Foreign Affairs	The Baron Pasquier	Constitutional
Minister of War	General The Marquis of La Tour-Maubourg	None
Minister of Finance	Antoine Roy	Constitutional
Minister of the Navy and Colonies	The Baron Portal	None

== Sources ==
- Muel, Léon (1891). Gouvernements, ministères et constitutions de la France depuis cent ans: Précis historique des révolutions, des crises ministérielles et gouvernementales, et des changements de constitutions de la France depuis 1789 jusqu'en 1890 ... Marchal et Billard.
