= Ministry of Charles-Maurice de Talleyrand-Périgord =

French government ministry of 1815

Talleyrand Ministry
- Cabinet of France

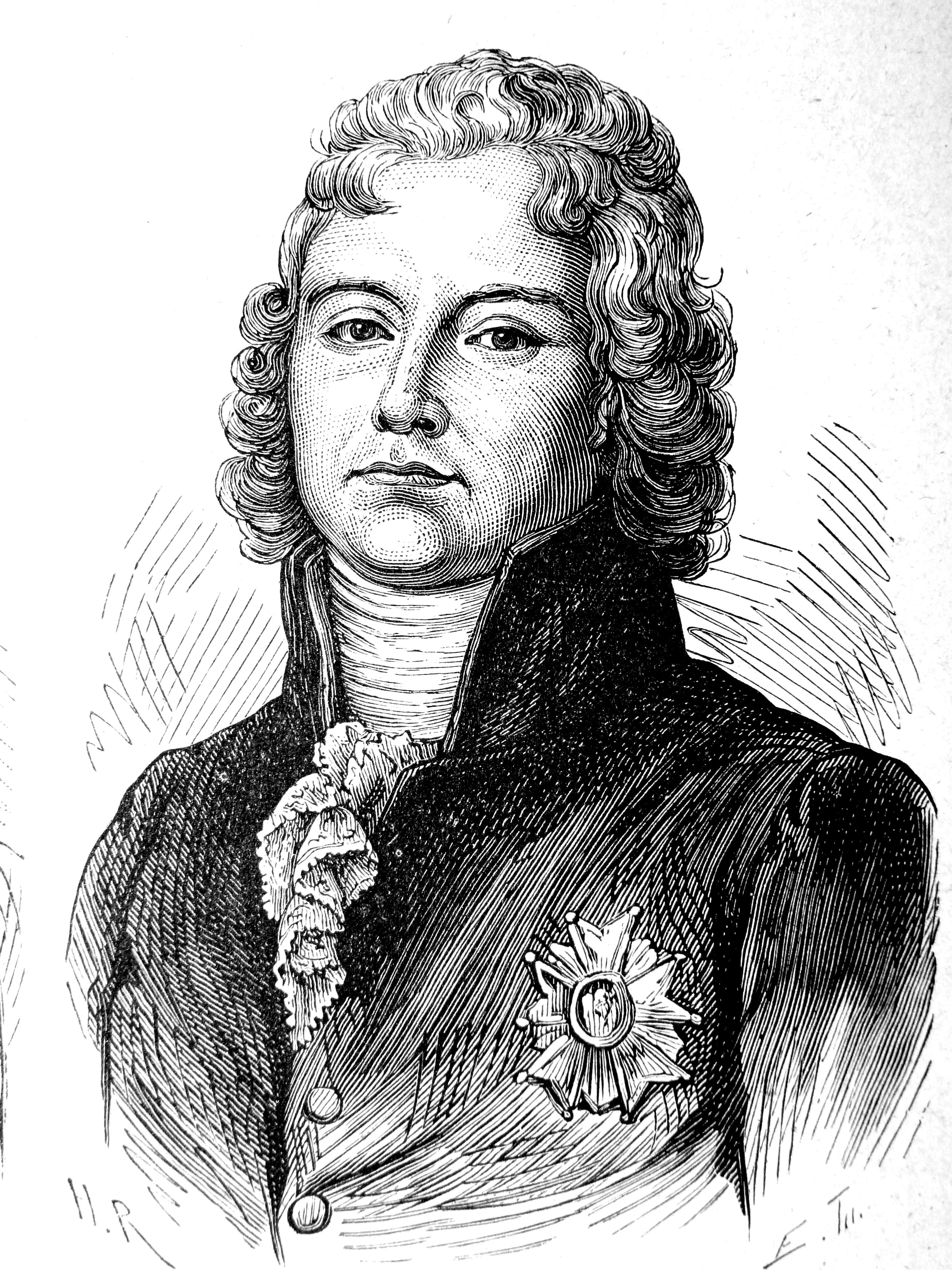
- Charles Maurice de Talleyrand-Périgord
- Date formed: 9 July 1815
- Date dissolved: 26 September 1815

People and organisations
- Head of state: Louis XVIII
- Head of government: Charles Maurice de Talleyrand-Périgord
- Total no. of members: 5
- Member party: Doctrinaire, nonpartisans
- Opposition party: Ultras
- Opposition leader: François-Régis de La Bourdonnaye

History
- Election: August 1815
- Predecessor: French Provisional Government of 1815
- Successor: First ministry of Armand-Emmanuel du Plessis de Richelieu

The Ministry of Charles-Maurice de Talleyrand-Périgord was formed on 9 July 1815 after the second Bourbon Restoration under King Louis XVIII. It replaced the French Provisional Government of 1815 that had been formed when Napoleon abdicated after the Battle of Waterloo. The cabinet was dissolved on 26 September 1815 and replaced by the First ministry of Armand-Emmanuel du Plessis de Richelieu.

== Formation and actions ==
The Prince of Talleyrand was again called to form a government by Louis XVIII, after the arrival of the King in Saint-Denis on 7 July.

Talleyrand formally formed his government on 9 July, keeping for himself the office of Minister of Foreign Affairs. The cabinet was composed mainly of Doctrinaires, liberal royalists who formed a moderate group inside the Chamber of Deputies, opposed to the more radical Ultras.

However, after 2 months and 17 days, Tallayrand resigned for three reasons:

- His refusal to sign the Second Treaty of Paris, considered too humiliating for France despite the conditions of peace negotiated during the Congress of Vienna.
- The pressure exercised on Louis XVIII by Tsar Alexander I, who disliked the presence of many ex-Bonapartists in the new government, and called for the creation of a conservative government
- The results of the August elections, that permitted the creation a parliamentary majority of Ultras (350 out of 400 seats), who were hostile to ex-Bonapartists Talleyrand and Minister Joseph Fouché, a regicide who was ousted from office in September 1815 and exiled.

== Ministers ==
Portfolio	Holder	Party
President of the Council of Ministers	The Prince of Talleyrand	Constitutional
Ministers
Minister of Foreign Affairs	The Prince of Talleyrand	Constitutional
Minister of the Interior and Justice	The Baron Pasquier	Constitutional
Minister of War	Marshal Marquis of Saint-Cyr	None
Minister of Finance	The Baron Louis	Constitutional
Minister of the Navy and Colonies	The Count of Jaucourt	Constitutional
Minister of Police	Joseph Fouché (Note: Never attended his functions due to Ultras' opposition. Exiled on 12 January 1816 for his role in the regicide of Louis XVI.)	None

== Sources ==
- Muel, Léon (1891). Gouvernements, ministères et constitutions de la France depuis cent ans: Précis historique des révolutions, des crises ministérielles et gouvernementales, et des changements de constitutions de la France depuis 1789 jusqu'en 1890 ... Marchal et Billard.
