= Ministry of Jean-Joseph Dessolles =

French government ministry from 1818–1819

- Cabinet of France

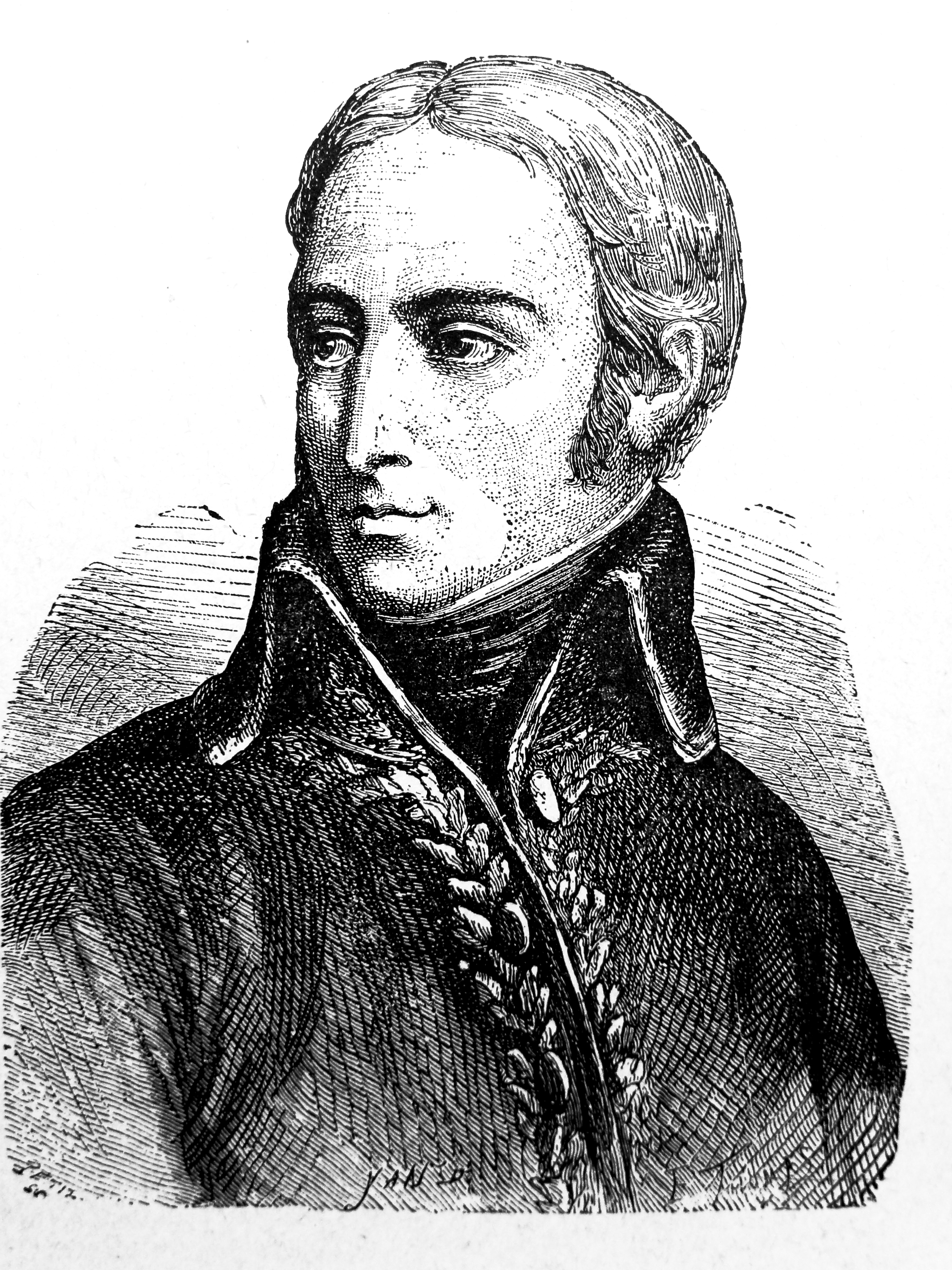
- Jean-Joseph, Marquis Dessolles
- Date formed: 29 December 1818
- Date dissolved: 19 November 1819

People and organisations
- Head of state: Louis XVIII
- Head of government: Jean-Joseph, Marquis Dessolles

History
- Predecessor: First ministry of Armand-Emmanuel du Plessis de Richelieu
- Successor: Ministry of Élie Decazes

The Ministry of Jean-Joseph Dessolles was formed on 29 December 1818 after the dismissal of the First ministry of Armand-Emmanuel du Plessis de Richelieu by King Louis XVIII. It was dissolved on 19 November 1819 and replaced by the Ministry of Élie Decazes.

== Ministers ==
The ministers were:

Portfolio	Holder	Party
President of the Council of Ministers	The Marquis Dessolles	Constitutional
Ministers
Minister of Foreign Affairs	The Marquis Dessolles	Constitutional
Minister of the Interior	The Count Decazes	Constitutional
Minister of Justice	The Count of Serre	Constitutional
Minister of War	Marshal Marquis of Saint-Cyr	None
Minister of Finance	The Baron Louis	Constitutional
Minister of the Navy and Colonies	The Baron Portal	None

== Sources ==
- Muel, Léon (1891). Gouvernements, ministères et constitutions de la France depuis cent ans: Précis historique des révolutions, des crises ministérielles et gouvernementales, et des changements de constitutions de la France depuis 1789 jusqu'en 1890 ... Marchal et Billard.
