= French Provisional Government of 1815 =

Provisional government after the abdication of Napoleon

French Executive Commission of 1815
- Cabinet of the First French Empire
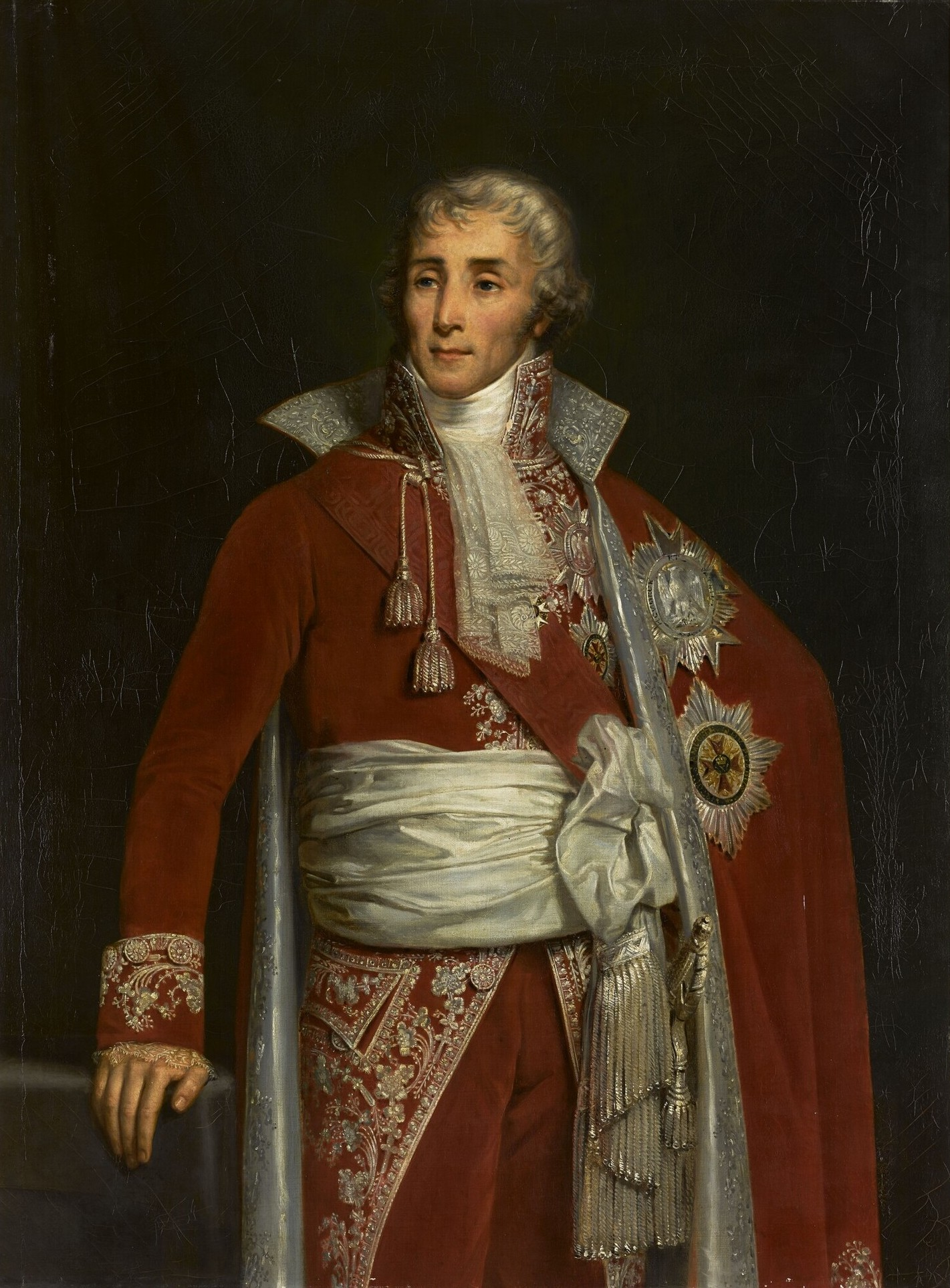
- Joseph Fouché
- Date formed: 22 June 1815
- Date dissolved: 7 July 1815

People and organisations
- Head of state: Napoleon II (de jure)
- Head of government: Joseph Fouché

History
- Predecessor: French government of the Hundred Days
- Successor: Ministry of Charles-Maurice de Talleyrand-Périgord

The French Provisional Government or French Executive Commission of 1815 replaced the French government of the Hundred Days that had been formed by Napoleon after his return from exile on Elba. It was formed on 22 June 1815 after the abdication of Napoleon following his defeat at the Battle of Waterloo.

The government acted under the nominal authority of Napoleon II, who had technically succeeded his father as Emperor after the abdication; however, this was a mere formality, since Napoleon II was a four-year-old child and was in Austria with his mother Marie Louise, and thus unable to actually exercise his powers.

Following the second Bourbon Restoration, on 9 July 1815 the Provisional Government was replaced by the Ministry of Charles-Maurice de Talleyrand-Périgord.

== Formation ==
On 12 June 1815 Napoleon left Paris for modern day Belgium, where the two Coalition armies, an allied one commanded by the Duke of Wellington and a Prussian one under Prince Gebhard Leberecht von Blücher were assembling. Napoleon was defeated at the Battle of Waterloo on 18 June 1815. He returned to Paris and abdicated for the second time on 22 June 1815. That day the two chambers nominated the members of the Provisional Government, that would serve as government until the second Bourbon Restoration.

== Members ==
The members of the commission named on 22 June 1815 were:

- Joseph Fouché (President)
- Lazare Carnot
- Paul Grenier
- Armand Augustin Louis de Caulaincourt
- Nicolas Marie Quinette

== Ministers ==
On 23 June 1815 new provisional commissioners were named to head four of the ministries:

- Foreign Affairs: Louis Pierre Édouard, Baron Bignon
- Interior: Claude-Marie Carnot
- Police: Joseph Pelet de la Lozère
- Justice: Antoine Boulay de la Meurthe

The other commissioners retained their positions. They were:

- Finance: Martin-Michel-Charles Gaudin
- Treasury: Nicolas François, Count Mollien
- Navy and Colonies: Denis Decrès
- War: Louis-Nicolas Davout

== Events ==
On 23 June 1815 Napoleon II was declared Emperor. The two Coalition armies under Prince Blücher and the Duke of Wellington advanced from the north and surrounded Paris. On 3 July 1815 the commissioners surrendered Paris under the terms of the Convention of St. Cloud. With the capital and departments occupied by Coalition troops, the Executive Commission was unable to function and resigned on 7 July 1815. The ministry of Charles-Maurice de Talleyrand-Périgord took office on 9 July 1815.
