= Hercule de Serre =

French politician and diplomat

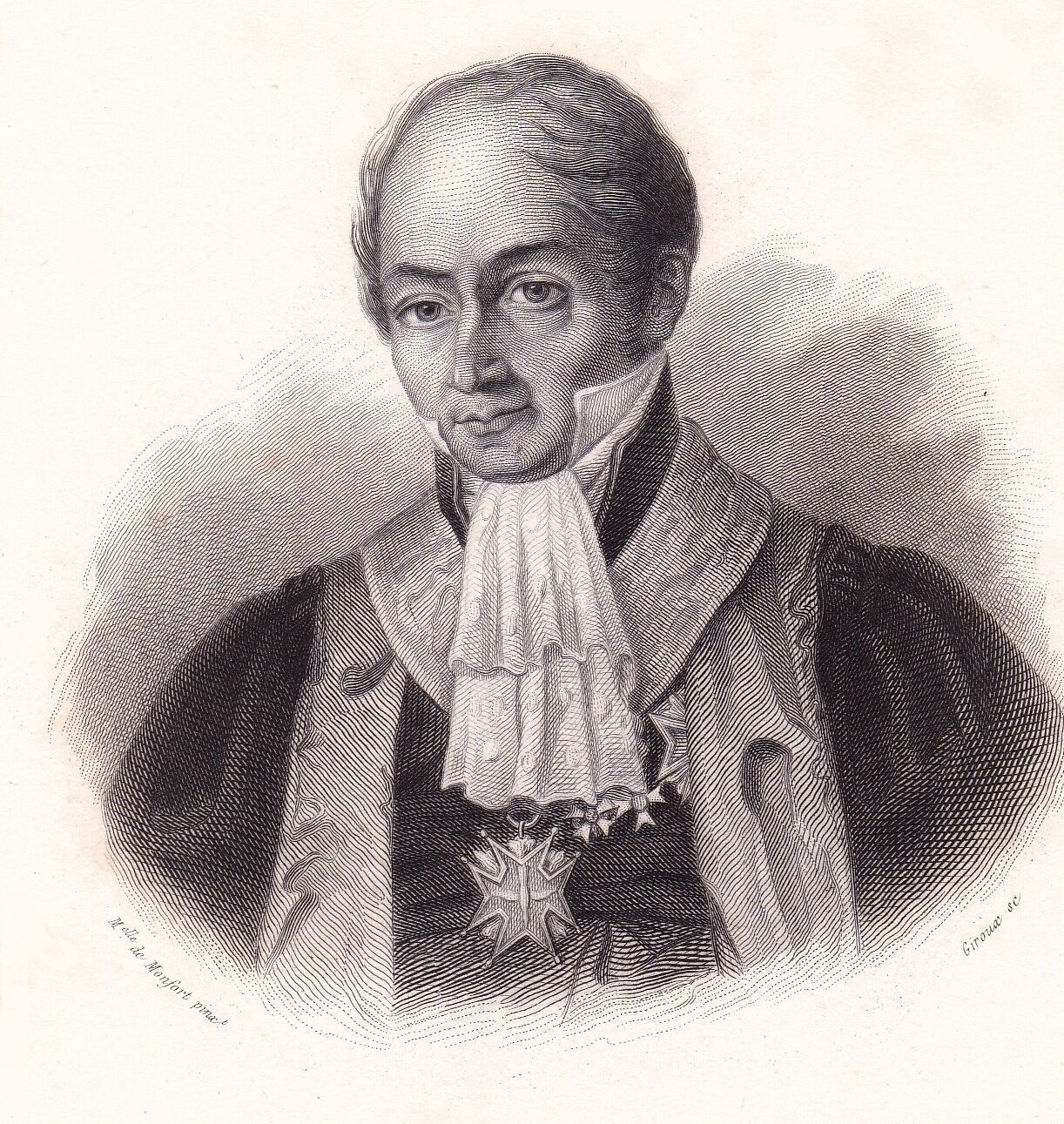

President of the Chamber of Deputies
- In office 17 November 1817 – 11 December 1818
- Preceded by: Étienne-Denis Pasquier
- Succeeded by: Auguste Ravez

Personal details
- Born: 12 March 1776 Pagny-sur-Moselle, Meurthe, France
- Died: 21 July 1824 (aged 48) Castellammare di Stabia, Naples, Italy
- Occupation: Soldier, lawyer and politician
- Known for: Minister of Justice

Pierre François Hercule, comte de Serre (12 March 1776 – 21 July 1824) was a French soldier, lawyer and politician. He was a deputy from 1815 to 1824, and was Minister of Justice in three successive cabinets from 1818 to 1821. He sat on the center-right, but had liberal views on press freedom, direct elections and the use of juries.

== Early years ==
Pierre François Hercule de Serre was born in Pagny-sur-Moselle, Meurthe, on 12 March 1776. His family originated in the Comtat Venaissin, but had become established in Lorraine. His father was François-Louis de Serre, a former cavalry officer, lord of the fief of Coureol, and Barbe-Marguerite de Maudhuy de Beauharnais. Hercule de Serre was destined for a career in the army, and studied at the School of Artillery at Chalons-sur-Marne. During the French Revolution (1789–98) he emigrated and served in the Army of Condé. He did not return to France until 1802. He studied law and was admitted to the Bar of Metz, where he distinguished himself. Napoleon appointed him Advocate General of Metz on 23 February 1811, then first president of the Imperial Court of Hamburg on 14 July 1811.

== Deputy ==
Hercule de Serre supported the Bourbon Restoration, and was appointed First President of the Court of Colmar in January 1815. He accompanied King Louis XVIII to Ghent during the Hundred Days (March–July 1815) when Napoleon returned from exile. On 15 August 1815 he was elected deputy for Haut-Rhin. He sat with the majority, supporting the government. He proposed, unsuccessfully, an amendment to the draft law on suspension of individual liberty. He defended General André Masséna against a petition demanding action against him. He also opposed the conclusions of the report of Kergolay on the return of unsold goods to the clergy. He was closely aligned with the views of Pierre Paul Royer-Collard.

De Serre was reelected on 4 October 1816 and on 20 September 1817. He sat with the majority, and in January 1817 was elected President of the Chamber of Deputies, replacing Étienne-Denis Pasquier. He held this position until the end of 1818, when he was replaced by Auguste Ravez. He tended to favor direct elections, but opposed the requirement to reelect members appointed to permanent offices, and approved the suspension of individual liberty. As Speaker, he proposed a new regulation of severe penalties for interruptions.

== Minister of Justice ==
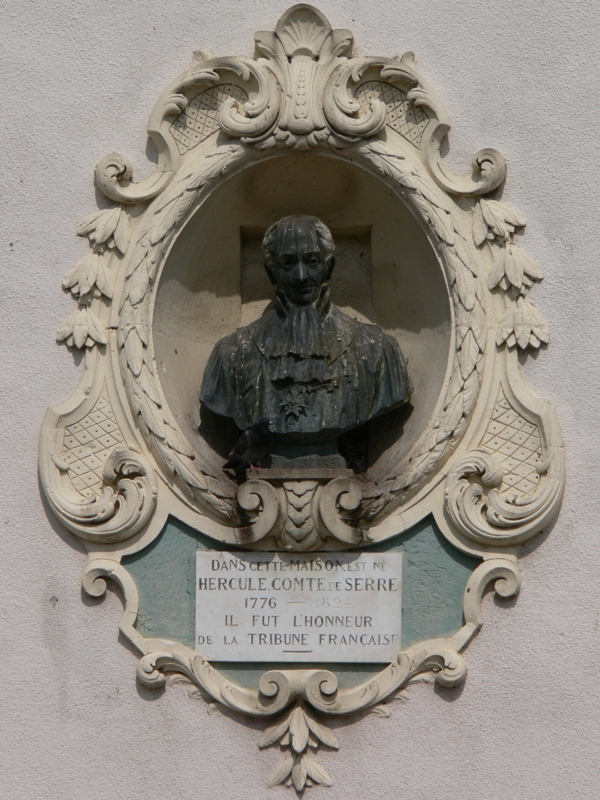
Bust of Hercule, Comte de Serre, in Pagny-sur-Moselle, Lorraine, France

On 30 December 1818 de Serre accepted the Justice portfolio in the Ministry of Jean-Joseph Dessolles. After agreement with Royer-Collard and the main Doctrinaires, he presented three new press laws establishing freedom from prior censorship, the competence of the jury even for minor offenses, and the admission of testimonial proof against officials. These proposals were attacked by the royalist right, and were not passed. On the other hand, he alienated liberal opinion when he said that the Charter of 1814 applied to voters; temporary exiles could still hope to return to France; but regicides never. This extreme statement was later modified to allow that the king could grant clemency for age and infirmity.

De Serre retained his position in the Ministry of Élie Decazes, formed on 19 November 1819. De Serre agreed with Élie Decazes when he wanted to change the electoral law. He did not follow his colleagues in their retreat after the assassination of Charles Ferdinand, Duke of Berry. He remained Minister of Justice in the Second ministry of Armand-Emmanuel du Plessis de Richelieu. After a stay in Nice to recover his health, at the end in April 1820 he resumed the struggle against the opponents of the proposed electoral law. The opposition was led by the Doctrinaire group and Royer-Collard. De Serre did not hesitate to eliminate his old friend from the Council of State. He recommended that magistrates apply the utmost rigor against "revolutionaries".

== Later career ==
De Serre refused to join the Ministry of Joseph de Villèle and was succeeded as Minister of Justice by Pierre-Denis, Comte de Peyronnet on 13 December 1821. He resumed his place in the Chamber on the center-right, and spoke in favor of the jurisdiction of juries in press trials. On 9 January 1822 he was appointed ambassador to the Kingdom of Naples. He attended the Congress of Verona. He ran without success in the legislative elections in 1824. He died later that year from a chest ailment. Serre died in Castellammare di Stabia, near Naples, on 21 July 1824 at the age of 48.
