= Access to Traffic Offense Records =

Access to Traffic Offense Records (ADOC) (French: Accès aux dossiers des contraventions) is a French law enforcement database created by a decree of October 13, 2004. It centralizes data from the National Automated Offense Processing Agency.

== Principle ==
The ADOC file allows judicial police officers, judicial police agents, and assistant judicial police officers to consult data recorded during the observation of offenses under the fixed penalty procedure, including traffic tickets and crimes. Historically, this file was used to record traffic offenses detected by automatic systems (speed cameras, red light cameras) or by ticketing officers.

== Breach of Lockdown ==
During the COVID-19 pandemic, the ADOC file was illegally accessed by law enforcement regarding efforts to fight the coronavirus. To track repeated breaches of the lockdown, which became a crime after four violations within thirty days, the police were led to consult the ADOC file, “intended for traffic offenses and not for 4th category fines”.

Arguing misuse of the file, lawyers secured the acquittal of defendants in various cases in France, notably in Rennes, and in Chalon-sur-Saône.

In response, the Ministry of Justice amended the decree of October 13, 2014. From that point onwards, the ADOC file allows the recording of all offenses observed under the fixed penalty procedure, including traffic tickets and crimes. The amendment took effect on April 17, 2020.
