= Ministry of Joseph de Villèle =

French government ministry from 1821–1828

- Cabinet of France

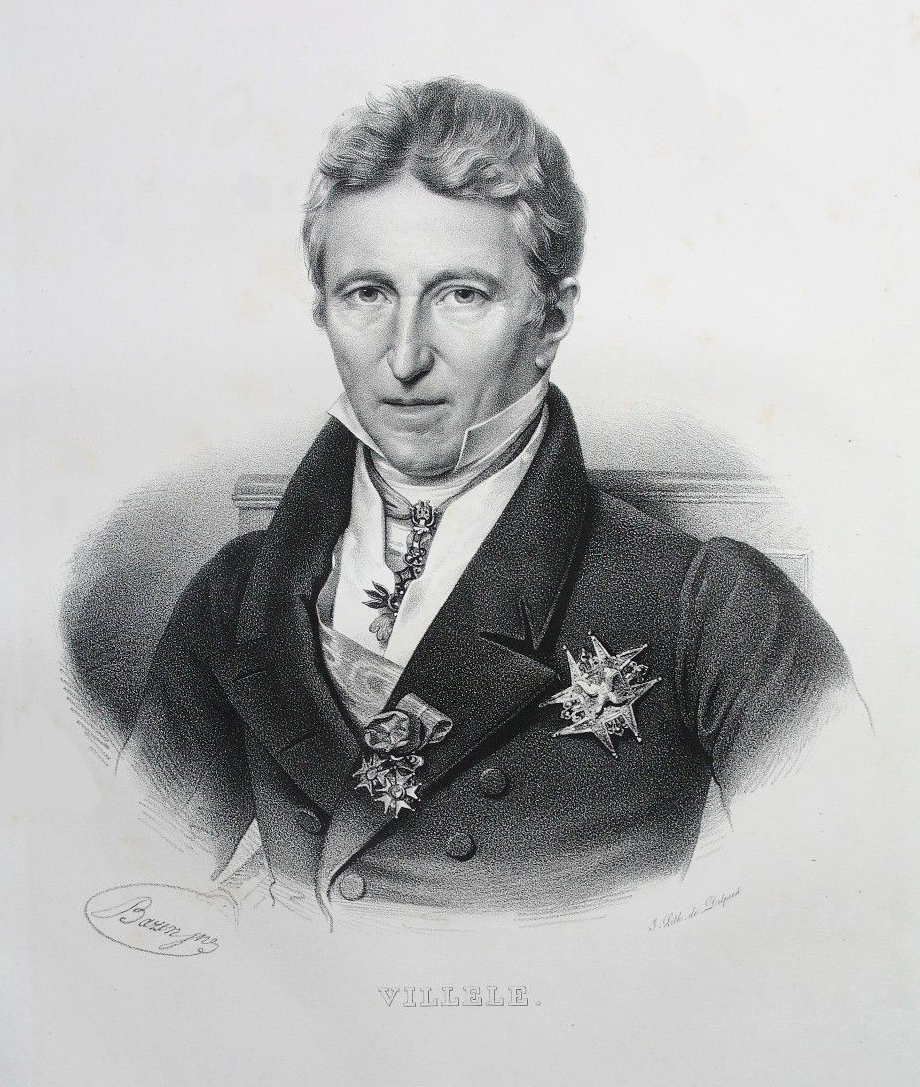
- Jean-Baptiste de Villèle
- Date formed: 14 December 1821
- Date dissolved: 6 December 1827

People and organisations
- Head of state: Louis XVIII; Charles X
- Head of government: Jean-Baptiste de Villèle

History
- Predecessor: Second ministry of Armand-Emmanuel du Plessis de Richelieu
- Successor: Ministry of Jean-Baptiste de Martignac

The Ministry of Joseph de Villèle was formed on 14 December 1821 after the dismissal of the Second ministry of Armand-Emmanuel du Plessis de Richelieu by King Louis XVIII.

During this ministry King Louis XVIII died on 16 September 1824. He was succeeded by his brother, who became King Charles X. After the elections of November 1827, which were unfavorable to the government, the ministry was dismissed on 6 December 1827. The king asked Villèle not to announce the change until a new ministry had been formed. The ministry was replaced on 4 January 1828 by the Ministry of Jean-Baptiste de Martignac.

== Ministers ==
The ministers were:

Portfolio	Holder	Party
President of the Council of Ministers	The Count of Villèle	Ultras
Ministers
Minister of Finance	The Count of Villèle	Ultras
Minister of Foreign Affairs	The Duke of Montmorency-Laval	Ultras
Minister of the Interior	The Count of Corbière	Ultras
Minister of Justice	The Count of Peyronnet	Ultras
Minister of War	Major General Duke of Bellune	Conservative
Minister of the Navy and Colonies	The Duke of Clermont-Tonnerre	Ultras
Minister of Public Education and Worship	Bishop Count of Frayssinous	Ultras
Minister for the Maison du Roi	Marshal Marquis of Lauriston	Conservative

== Changes ==
On 28 December 1822:

Portfolio	Holder	Party
Minister of Foreign Affairs	The Viscount of Chateubriand	Ultras

On 4 August 1824:

Portfolio	Holder	Party
Minister of Foreign Affairs	Major General Baron of Damas	Conservative
Minister of the Navy and Colonies	Count of Chambrol	Conservative
Minister for the Maison du Roi	The Viscount of La Rochefoucauld	Ultras

On 11 August 1824:

Portfolio	Holder	Party
Minister of War	The Duke of Clermont-Tonnerre	Ultras

== Sources ==
- Muel, Léon (1891). Gouvernements, ministères et constitutions de la France depuis cent ans: Précis historique des révolutions, des crises ministérielles et gouvernementales, et des changements de constitutions de la France depuis 1789 jusqu'en 1890 ... Marchal et Billard.
