= Antoine Roy =

French lawyer and politician

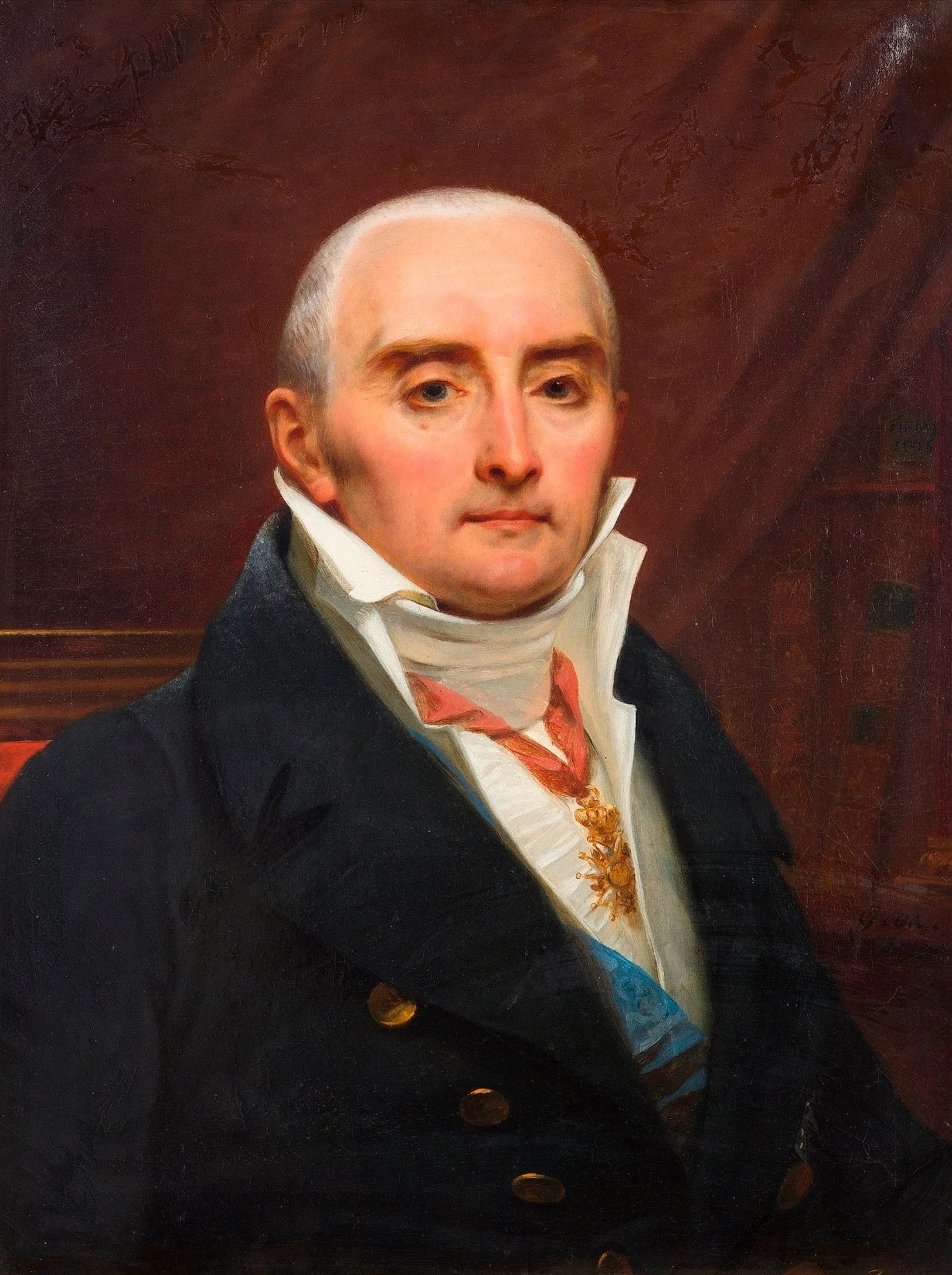
- Antoine-Jean Gros, Portrait of Antoine Roy, comte Roy, circa 1821-1824
- Born: 5 March 1764; Savigny, Haute-Marne, France
- Died: 3 April 1847 (aged 83); Paris, France
- Occupations: Lawyer, politician
- Known for: Minister of Finance

Antoine Roy (5 March 1764 – 3 April 1847) was a French lawyer and politician. He was a National Representative during the Hundred Days when Napoleon returned from Elba, a Deputy from 1815 to 1821, a peer of France and three times Minister of Finance.

== Early years ==
Antoine Roy was born in Savigny, Haute-Marne, on 5 March 1764. His parents were Charles Roy, bourgeois and resident of Savigny and Miss Claudette Grisot. He studied at the College of Langres, then studied law in Paris and was admitted to the bar in 1785. He did not approve of the French Revolution and remained at the bar, but took advantage of the opportunity to acquire national property in 1791. He defended Rozoy in 1792, and in the year III defended several of the accused of 13 Vendémiaire.

On 17 April 1793 Roy married Adélaïde-Sophie Barré, daughter of Jean-Benoît-Vincent Barré, an architect, and Marie-Félicité Germain. They had two daughters, Marie-Élisa (1794–1851) and Alexandrine-Sophie-Laure (1799–1854). Roy associated with Claude Caroillon Destillières in exploiting the forests and in running major ironworks. During the Revolution and the Empire Roy was a leading provider of supplies to the Ministries of War and the Navy, which protected him from problems arising from his royalist sympathies.

Roy's openly royalist leanings led to the Duke of Bouillon giving him enjoyment of the land of Navarre and the administration of its forests in 1798. He acquired the greater part of the property of the Duke of Bouillon, who was having grave financial difficulties, in exchange for an annual payment of 300,000 francs. A few months later the Duke died suddenly and Roy became one of the richest landowners in France. In 1801 he was sued by the state for repayment of 2 million francs, saying he had wrongly taken that amount while administering the Duke's property, which was now the property of the State. Roy refused to give up his claim to the forest of Navarre, but lost trials in 1802 and again in 1813. The Navarre domains passed to the Empress Josephine, then to prince Eugène de Beauharnais and his son. Roy never forgave Napoleon for this.

During the Hundred Days when Napoleon returned from exile Roy was elected on 7 May 1815 to represent the Seine. He stood as an irreconcilable opponent of Napoleon. On 6 June 1815 he opposed taking the oath of fidelity. On 16 June he asked for a special committee to examine whether war was necessary. During the discussion of financial law, he took the floor again and tried all methods of removing resources from the army.

== Bourbon restoration ==
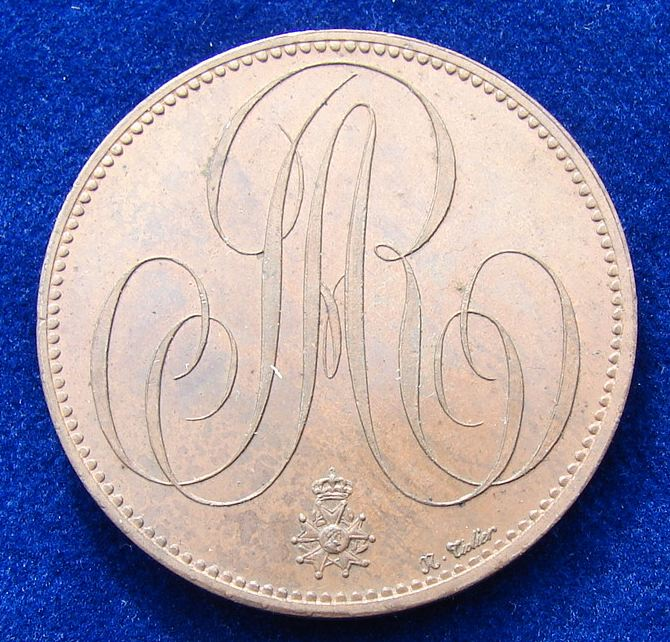
1820 medal with Roy's monogram and arms of the Légion d’Honneur, by Nicolas-Pierre Tiolier

When the Bourbon court returned from Ghent Roy hastened to meet it. He was received as a victim of imperial despotism, but the king expressed the view that if he had a complaint, it was not of poverty. Roy was reelected deputy on 22 August 1815, and again on 4 October 1816 and 20 September 1817. He often voted with the minority, particularly on secondary issues, and affected a degree of liberalism. He was rapporteur of the budget in 1817 and 1818, and in this role in 1819 found a saving of 19 millions.

On 7 December 1818 he was called to succeed Louis-Emmanuel Corvetto as Minister of Finance, but was unable to achieve any reforms before the Richelieu cabinet resigned on 28 December 1818. He was named Minister of State and member of the Privy Council, Commissioner of the Sinking Fund and of the Deposit and Consignment Office. He returned to his seat in the Chamber, and was responsible for reviewing the backlog of financial statements for the years 1815–1818. After his report on the new budget he obtained a reduction of 20 million in the movable and immovable contributions.

On 19 November 1819 he was again appointed Minister of Finance, replacing Baron Louis. He held this position until 14 December 1821, and initiated several reforms that significantly improved the financial situation of France. On 4 January 1820 he filed a proposal for the final release of the purchasers of national property. On 16 January 1821 he obtained a considerable reduction of land taxes. After the evacuation of territory by the allies he regularized departmental debts.

In December 1821 he handed his portfolio to Jean-Baptiste de Villèle. He was made a peer of France on 13 December 1821 and created a Count by the king. In the Upper House he continued to occupy himself mainly with financial issues. When Jean-Baptiste de Martignac formed his ministry Roy was appointed Minister of Finance for a third time, holding office from 5 January 1828 to 7 August 1829. However, his financial proposals met many obstacles from the parliamentary majority. King Charles X decided to form a strong reactionary cabinet under Jules de Polignac, and asked Roy to keep his portfolio. However, due to the attached conditions Roy felt obliged to refuse.

== July monarchy ==
Roy retired on 21 February 1830, and was awarded the orders of the Holy Spirit and St. Michel. From then on Roy devoted himself exclusively to the business of the upper chamber. He accepted the government of Louis Philippe I without hesitation and was often responsible for reports on taxes, the lottery and the budget. He was awarded the Grand Cross of the Legion of Honor. Antoine Roy died in Paris on 3 April 1847, aged 83. He left a fortune that was estimated at 40 million francs.

== Sources ==
- Antonetti, Guy (25 January 2013). Roy (Antoine) (in French). Institut de la gestion publique et du développement économique. ISBN 978-2-11-094807-6.
- Robert, Adolphe; Cougny, Gaston (1891). "Roy (Antoine, Comte)". Dictionnaire des parlementaires français de 1789 à 1889 (PDF). Vol. V: de PLA à ZUY. Archived from the original (PDF) on 2015-09-23.
- "Roy". Institut de la gestion publique et du développement économique (IGPDE).
