= Doctrinaires =

1814–1848 political faction in France

Doctrinals Doctrinaires
- Leader: Pierre Paul Royer-Collard; François Guizot; Duke of Broglie
- Monarch: Louis XVIII
- Founded: 8 July 1815; 211 years ago
- Dissolved: 1848; 178 years ago
- Preceded by: Liberal Party (1817)
- Succeeded by: Movement Party; Resistance Party
- Newspaper: Le Censeur
- Ideology: Chartism; Classical liberalism; Conservative liberalism; Orléanism (minority)
- Political position: Centre-left to centre-right
- Colours: Celeste
- Politics of France; Political parties; Elections; A: The Docrinaires were one of the major monarchist parties during the Bourbon Restoration period. The Docrinaires were right-leaning compared to the more progressive centre-left Liberal Party, but were more moderate compared to the further right-wing Ultra-royalists. Additionally, most liberals during its existence were considered to belong closer to the political left.

During the Bourbon Restoration (1814–1830) and the July Monarchy (1830–1848), the Doctrinals (Note: French: Doctrinaires [dɔk.tʁi.nɛʁ].) were a group of French royalists who hoped to reconcile the monarchy with the French Revolution and power with liberty. Headed by Royer-Collard, these liberal royalists were in favor of a constitutional monarchy, but with a heavily restricted census suffrage—Louis XVIII, who had been restored to the throne, had granted a Charter to the French with a Chamber of Peers and a Chamber of Deputies elected under tight electoral laws (only around 100,000 Frenchmen had at the time the right to vote). The Doctrinaires were a centrist, as well as a conservative-liberal group, but at that time, liberal was considered to be the mainstream political left, so the group was considered a centre-left group.

During the July Monarchy, they were an intellectual and political group within the Resistance Party. Led by the Duke of Broglie and François Guizot, the Doctrinaires held powerful posts throughout the reign of Louis-Philippe. Broglie (1835–1836) and Guizot (1847–1848) were both Prime Ministers of France, although Guizot and the Doctrinaires dominated the political scenery during the premiership of Marshal Jean-de-Dieu Soult (1840–1847).

== History and characteristics ==
=== Origins ===
The Doctrinaires first obtained in 1816 the co-operation of Louis XVIII, who had been frightened by the violence of the Ultra-royalists in the Chambre introuvable of 1815. However, the Ultras quickly came back to government, headed by the comte de Villèle. The Doctrinaires were then in the opposition, although they remained quite close to the government, especially to Decazes who assumed some governmental offices. The Doctrinaires were opposed on their left by republicans and liberals, and on their right by the Ultras.

Finally, the Doctrinaires were destroyed by Charles X, the reactionary successor of his brother Louis XVIII. Charles took the ultra prince de Polignac as his minister. This nomination in part caused the 1830 July Revolution, during which the Doctrinaires became absorbed in the Orléanists, from whom they had never been separated on any ground of principle. According to René Rémond's famous classification of the various right-wing families in France, the Orléanists became the second right-wing tradition to emerge after the Legitimists, a term used to refer to the Ultras after the July Revolution.

=== Doctrinaires, a pejorative word quickly reappropriated ===
As has often been the case with party designations, the name was at first given in derision and by an enemy. In 1816, the Nain jaune réfugié, a French paper, published at Brussels by Bonapartist and liberal exiles, began to speak of Royer-Collard as the doctrinaire and also as le Pierre Royer-Collard de la doctrine chrétienne, a name which came from Royer-Collard's studies under the Prêtres de la doctrine chrétienne, a French religious order founded in 1592 by César de Bus and popularly known as the doctrinaires.

The choice of a nickname for Royer-Collard does credit to the journalistic insight of the contributors to the Nain jaune réfugié, for he was emphatically a man who made it his business to preach a doctrine and an orthodoxy. The term quickly became popular and was extended to Royer-Collard's colleagues, who came from different horizons. The duc de Richelieu and Hercule de Serre had been royalist émigrés during the revolutionary and imperial epoch.

=== Nationalizing the monarchy and royalizing France ===
Royer-Collard himself, Jean Maximilien Lamarque and Maine de Biran had sat in the revolutionary Assemblies. Pasquier, the comte de Beugnot, the baron de Barante, Georges Cuvier, Mounier, Guizot and Decazes had been imperial officials, but they were closely united by political principle and also by a certain similarity of method. Some of them, notably Guizot and Maine de Biran, were theorists and commentators on the principles of government. The baron de Barante was an eminent man of letters. All were noted for the doctrinal coherence of their principles and the dialectical rigidity of their arguments. The object of the party as defined by the future duc Decazes was to "nationalize the monarchy and to royalize France". The king, who had been king of France during the Ancien Régime, ultimately became king of the French under the July Monarchy. This illustrated the change from the divine right of kings to national sovereignty as sovereignty was not derived from God anymore, but from the people.

The means by which they hoped to attain this end were a loyal application of the Charter granted by Louis XVIII and the steady co-operation of the king with themselves to defeat the Ultra-royalists, a group of counterrevolutionaries who aimed at the complete undoing of the political and social work of the French Revolution. The Doctrinaires were ready to allow the king a large discretion in the choice of his ministers and the direction of national policy. They refused the principle of parliamentary responsibility, that is to allow that ministers should be removed in obedience to a hostile vote in the chamber.

Their ideal in fact was a combination of a king who frankly accepted the results of the Revolution and who governed in a liberal spirit, with the advice of a chamber elected by a very limited constituency in which men of property and education formed, if not the wholes at least the very great majority of the voters. This king was not to be found until Louis-Philippe's reign during the July Monarchy. Guizot set forth the Doctrinaires' ideology in his 1816 treatise Du gouvernement représentatif et de l'état actuel de la France. The chief organs of the party in the press were the Indépendant (renamed the Constitutionnel in 1817) and the Journal des Débats. The Doctrinaires were chiefly supported by ex officials of the empire who believed in the necessity for monarchical government, but had a lively memory of Napoleon's authoritative rule and a no less lively hatred of the Ancien Régime — merchants, manufacturers and members of the liberal professions, particularly the lawyers.

== English terminology ==
The word doctrinaire has become naturalized in English terminology as applied in a slightly contemptuous sense to a theorist as distinguished from a practical man of affairs.

== Prominent members ==
- The Baron of Barante
- Jacques Claude Beugnot
- Louis Becquey
- Maine de Biran
- The Duke of Broglie
- Pierre Paul Royer-Collard
- Benjamin Constant
- Victor Cousin
- Georges Cuvier
- Élie Decazes
- The Marquis Dessolles
- Tanneguy Duchâtel
- François Guizot
- Prosper Duvergier de Hauranne
- Hippolyte François Jaubert
- Camille Jordan
- Théodore Simon Jouffroy
- The Marquis of Lafayette
- Jean Maximilien Lamarque
- Étienne-Denis Pasquier
- The Count of Rémusat
- The Duke of Richelieu
- Hercule de Serre
- Charles Maurice de Talleyrand
- Abel-François Villemain
- Chateaubriand, himself a classical conservative, sided with the ultra-royalistes but joined the liberal-doctrinaire opposition against ultras minister Villèle

== Electoral results ==
Chamber of Deputies
Election year	No. of overall votes	% of overall vote	No. of overall seats won	+/–	Leader
1815	5,200 (2nd)	12.5	50 / 400	New	Pierre Paul Royer-Collard
1816	49,820 (1st)	52.7	136 / 258	▲86	Pierre Paul Royer-Collard
1820	42,300 (1st)	44.7	194 / 434	▲58	Élie Decazes
1824	3,760 (2nd)	4.0	17 / 430	▼177	Pierre Paul Royer-Collard
1827	37,600 (2nd)	39.5	170 / 430	▲163	The Marquis of Lafayette
1830	46,060 (2nd)	49.3	274 / 378	▲204	The Marquis of Lafayette
1831	76,805 (1st)	61.4	282 / 459	▲8	Casimir Périer
