= Joseph Lainé =

French lawyer and politician

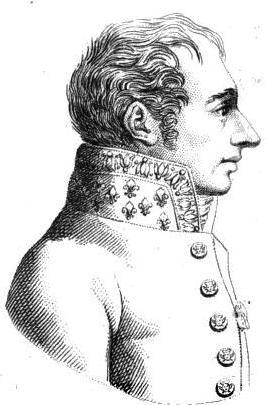

Joseph Henri Joachim, vicomte Lainé (11 November 1768 – 17 December 1835), was a French lawyer and politician.

Born in Bordeaux, he became a successful lawyer in Paris. In 1793 he was named administrator of the district of La Réole, returning to work as a lawyer under the French Directory. In 1808 he became a member of the Legislative Corps; he was again deputy after the Restoration, being chosen as Minister of Interiors between 1816 and 1818.

He died in Paris in 1835.
