= Étienne-Denis Pasquier =

French politician (1767–1862)

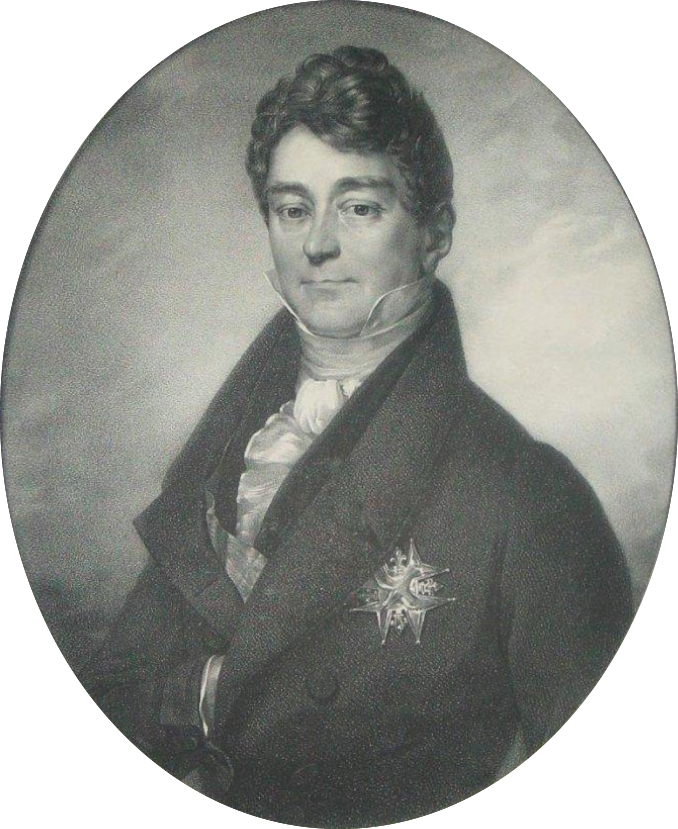

President of the Chamber of Peers
- In office 3 August 1830 – 24 February 1848
- Preceded by: Claude-Emmanuel de Pastoret
- Succeeded by: Jérôme Bonaparte (as President of the Senate)

President of the Chamber of Deputies
- In office 12 November 1816 – 13 November 1817
- Preceded by: Joseph Lainé
- Succeeded by: Hercule de Serre

Personal details
- Born: 21 May 1767 Paris, France
- Died: 5 July 1862 (aged 95) Paris, France
- Occupation: French statesman

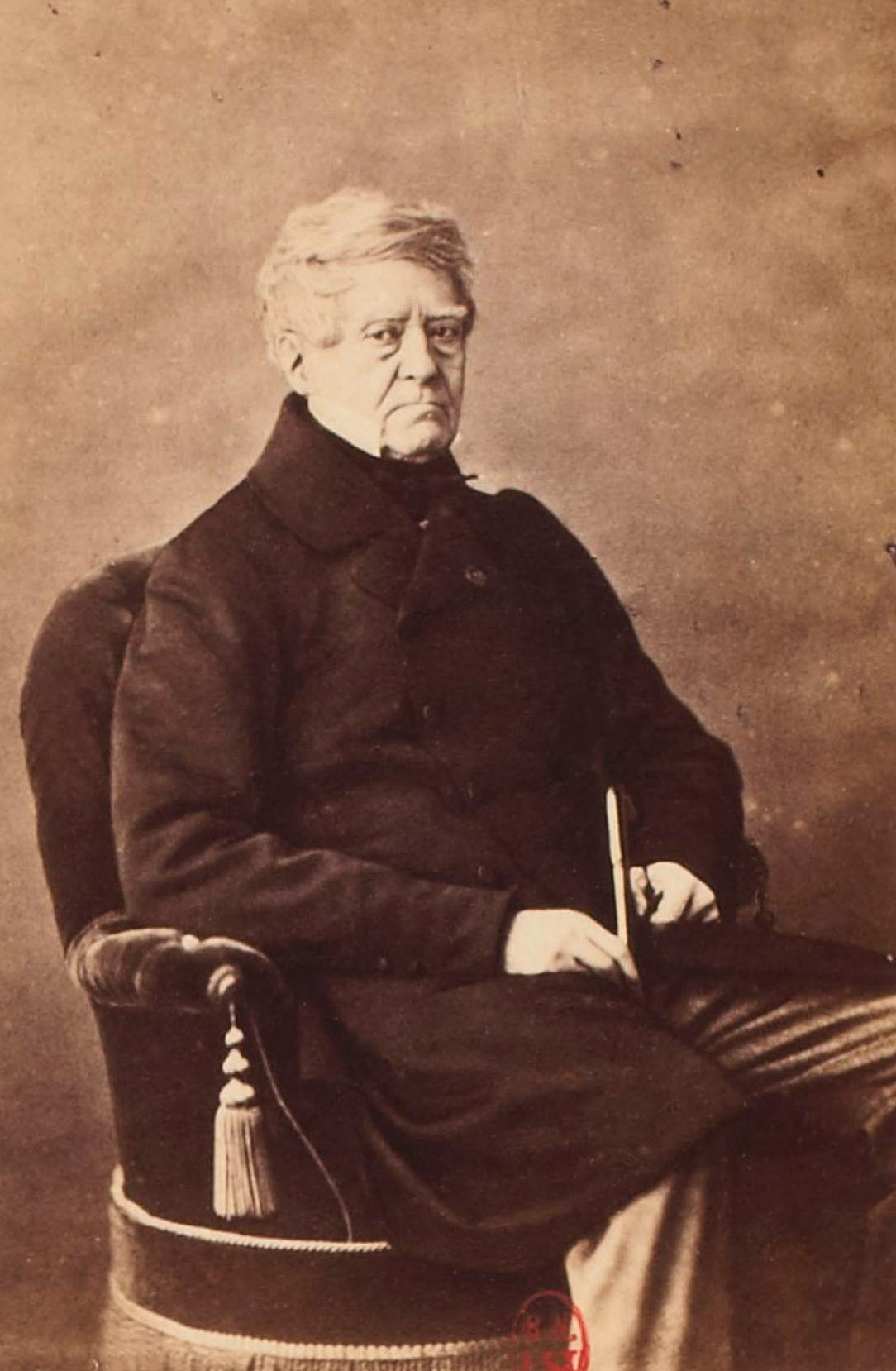
Studio portrait of Étienne-Denis Pasquier c.1850

Étienne-Denis, duc de Pasquier (21 April 1767 – 5 July 1862), Chancelier de France, (a title revived for him by King Louis Philippe I in 1837), was a French statesman. In 1842, he was elected a member of the Académie française, and in the same year was created a duke by Louis-Philippe.

== Biography ==
Born in Paris in a family of the noblesse de robe, with ancestors such as Étienne Pasquier, he was destined for the legal profession and was educated at the Collège de Juilly near Paris. He then became a counsellor of the parlement de Paris, and witnessed many of the incidents that marked the growing hostility between that body and Louis XVI in the years preceding the French Revolution of 1789.

His views were those of a moderate reformer, determined to preserve the House of Bourbon in a renovated France; his memoirs depict in a favorable light the actions of his parlement (an institution soon to be abolished towards the end of the year 1789, under growing revolutionary pressures).

For some time, and especially during the Reign of Terror (1793–1794), Pasquier remained in obscurity; but this did not save him from arrest nor his father from execution in the year 1794. He was incarcerated for two months in the Saint-Lazare Prison shortly before the start of Thermidorian Reaction, and released after the fall and execution of Maximilien Robespierre at the end of July 1794.

== Empire ==
He did not re-enter the public service until the period of the First French Empire, when the arch-chancellor Jean Jacques Régis de Cambacérès used his influence with Napoleon to procure for him the office of maître des requêtes to the Conseil d'État. In 1809, he became baron of the Empire, and in February 1810 counsellor of State. In October 1810, the Emperor made him prefect of police of Paris.

The main challenge of his career was the strange conspiracy of the republican general Claude François de Malet (October 1812); Malet, spreading false news that Napoleon had died in the Russian campaign, managed to surprise and capture some of the ministers and other authorities in Paris, among them Pasquier. However, the attempt's manifest failure enabled Pasquier to speedily regain his liberty.

== Restoration and July Monarchy ==
When Napoleon abdicated in April 1814, Pasquier continued to exercise his functions for a few days in order to preserve order, and then resigned from the prefecture of police, whereupon Louis XVIII allotted to him the Corps des Ponts et Chaussées. He distanced himself from the Imperial restoration at the time of the Hundred Days (1815), and, after the final Bourbon Restoration, became Keeper of the Seal (July 1815). Finding it impossible to work with the Ultra-royalists of the Chamber of Deputies (the Chambre introuvable), he resigned office in September. Under the more moderate ministers of succeeding years, he again held various appointments, but refused to join the reactionary cabinets of the close of the reign of Charles X.

After the July Revolution (1830), he became president of the Chamber of Peers, a post which he held through the whole of the reign of Louis Philippe I (1830–1848). After the abdication of Louis-Philippe in February 1848, Chancelier Pasquier retired from active life and set to work to compile the notes and reminiscences of his long and active career. He died in Paris at the age of ninety-five on 5 July 1862.

== Sources ==
- In turn, it cites as references:
  - Mémoires du Chancelier Pasquier (6 vols., Paris, 1893–1895; partly translated into English, 4 vols., London, 1893–1894)
  - L. de Vieilcastel, Histoire de la Restauration, vols. i.iv.

Political offices
Preceded by Antoine Boulay de la Meurthe	Minister of Justice; 1815	Succeeded by François de Barbé-Marbois
Preceded by Charles-Henri Dambray	Minister of Justice; 1817–1818	Succeeded by Pierre François Hercule de Serre
