= Ultra-royalists (France) =

Monarchist political faction in Bourbon Restoration France

Ultra-royalists Ultraroyalistes
- Leader: Joseph de Villèle; Charles X
- Founded: 1815; 211 years ago
- Dissolved: 1830; 196 years ago
- Succeeded by: Legitimists
- Newspaper: La Gazette; La Quotidienne; Le Conservateur
- Ideology: Monarchism; Reactionarism; Ultramontanism; Conservatism
- Political position: Right-wing
- Religion: Catholicism
- Chamber of Deputies (1824): 413 / 430

The Ultra-royalists (French: ultraroyalistes, collectively Ultras) were a French political faction from 1815 to 1830 under the Bourbon Restoration. An Ultra was usually a member of the nobility of high society who strongly supported Catholicism as the state and only legal religion of France, the Bourbon monarchy, traditional hierarchy between classes and census suffrage (privileged voting rights), while rejecting the political philosophy of popular will and the interests of the bourgeoisie along with their liberal and democratic tendencies.

The Legitimists, another of the main right-wing factions identified in René Rémond's Les Droites en France, were disparagingly classified with the Ultras after the 1830 July Revolution by the victors, the Orléanists, who deposed the Bourbon dynasty for the more liberal king Louis Philippe.

== Second White Terror ==
Following the return of Louis XVIII to power in 1815, people suspected of having ties with the governments of the French Revolution or of Napoleon suffered arrest. Several hundred were killed by angry mobs or executed after an informal summary court-martial. The episodes happened primarily in the south of France.

Historian John Baptist Wolf argues Ultra-royalists—many of whom had just returned from exile—were staging a counter-revolution against the French Revolution and also against Napoleon's revolution.

Throughout the Midi — in Provence, Avignon, Languedoc, and many other places — the White Terror raged with unrelenting ferocity. The royalists found in the willingness of the French to desert the king fresh proof of their theory that the nation was honeycombed with traitors, and used every means to seek out and destroy their enemies. The government was powerless or unwilling to intervene.

== Bourbon Restoration ==
Inaugurating the Bourbon Restoration (1814–1830), a strongly restricted census suffrage elected to the Chamber of Deputies an Ultra-royalist majority (la Chambre introuvable) in 1815–1816 and again from 1824 to 1827. Known to be "more royalist than the king" (plus royalistes que le roi), the Ultras were the dominant political faction under Louis XVIII (1815–1824) and Charles X (1824–1830). Opposed to the limitation of the sovereign's power under the constitutional monarchy, they hoped to restore the Ancien Régime and annul the rupture created by the French Revolution. Passionately espousing the ruling ideology of the Restoration, the Ultras opposed liberalism, republicanism and democracy. While Louis XVIII hoped for a moderate restoration of the Ancien Régime, acceptable to the masses who had participated in the Revolution, the Ultras held rigidly to the dream of an integral restoration. Their power was due in part to electoral laws which largely favored them: on one hand a Chamber of Peers composed of hereditary members and on the other hand a Chamber of Deputies elected under a heavily restricted census suffrage of approximately 100,000 voters.

In 1815, an Ultra majority was elected to the chamber of deputies. Louis XVIII dubbed them La Chambre Introuvable, "the unfindable chamber", due to his astonishment at a group of deputies more royalist than himself. Under the guidance of his chief minister the Armand-Emmenuel de Vignerot du Plessis, Duc de Richelieu, Louis XVIII finally decided to dissolve this turbulent assembly, invoking Article 14 of the Constitutional Charter. There followed a "Liberal Interlude" from 1816–1820, a period of "wilderness years" for the Ultras. Then on 13 February 1820, the Duke of Berry was stabbed by a republican assassin as he left the Paris Opera House with his wife and died the next day. This outrage strengthened the Ultras, who then introduced laws such as the Law of the Double Vote which allowed them to further dominate the Chamber of Deputies. In addition to other factors, Louis XVIII's health was in serious decline, reducing his resistance to Ultra demands: even before he came to the throne, the Comte d'Artois (Charles X) already dominated the government.

The 1824 death of Louis XVIII, whom they saw as too moderate, lifted the spirits of the Ultras: they expected their leader, the new king Charles X, would soon become an absolute monarch, answerable only to God. In January 1825, Villèle's government enacted the Anti-Sacrilege Act, instituting capital punishment for the theft of sacred monstrance vases (with or without consecrated hosts). This "anachronistic law" (Jean-Noël Jeanneney) was never seriously applied and was repealed in the first months of Louis Philippe's reign (1830–1848). The Ultras also wanted to create courts to punish Radicals and passed laws restricting freedom of the press.

== Legitimists, the successor of the Ultras ==
The 1830 July Revolution replaced the Bourbons with the more liberal Orléanist branch and sent the Ultras back to private life in their country chateaux. However, they retained some influence until at least the 16 May 1877 crisis and even further. Their views softened, their principal aim became the restoration of the House of Bourbon and they became known from 1830 on as Legitimists. The historian René Rémond has identified the Legitimists as the first of the "right-wing families" of French politics, followed by the Orléanists and the Bonapartists. According to him, many modern far-right movements, including parts of Jean-Marie Le Pen's National Front and Archbishop Marcel Lefebvre's Society of St. Pius X, should be considered as parts of the Legitimist family.

== Notable members ==
Leader
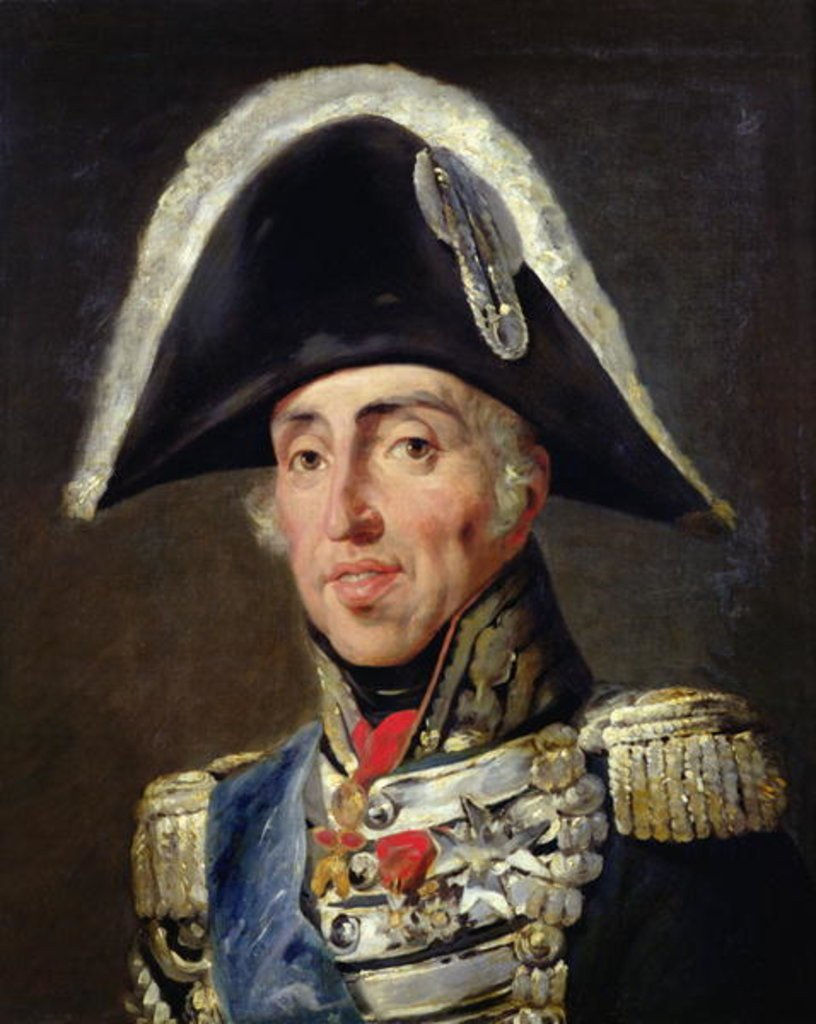
Prince Charles, Count of Artois
became King Charles X
Ministers and top parliamentarians
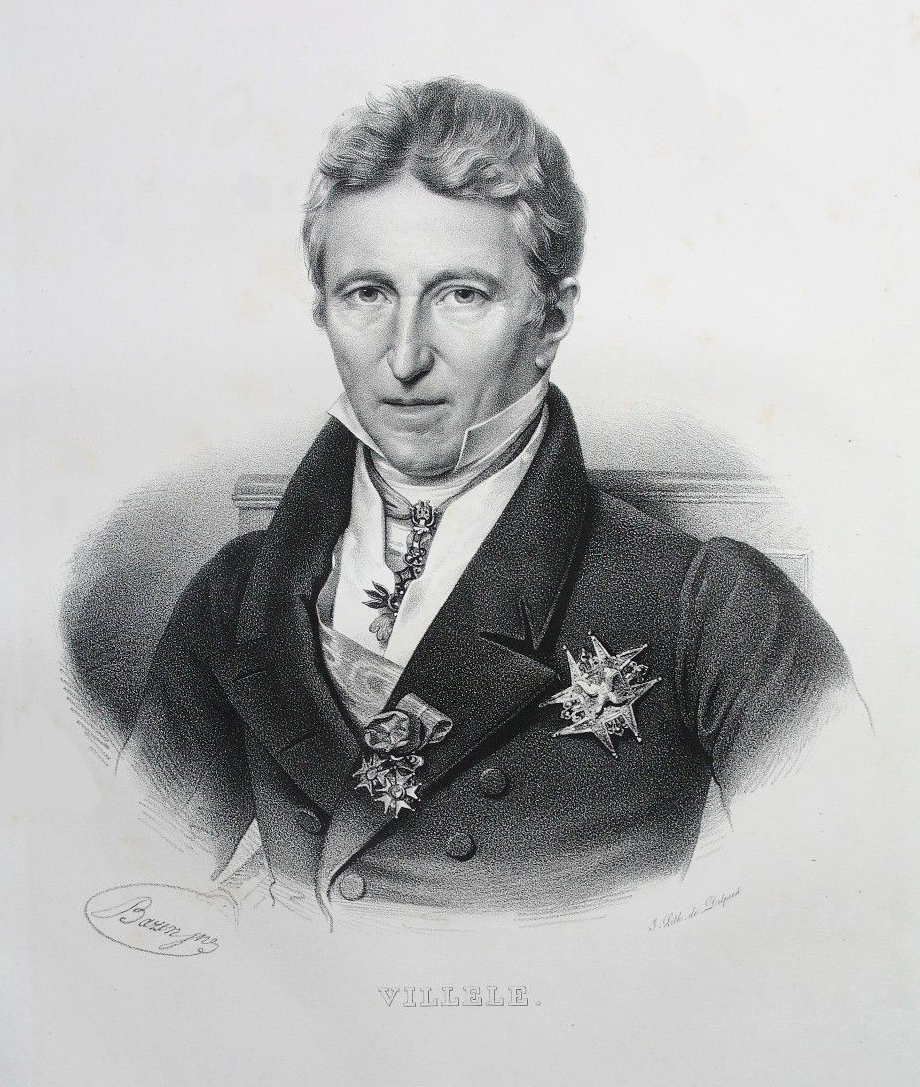
Joseph de Villèle

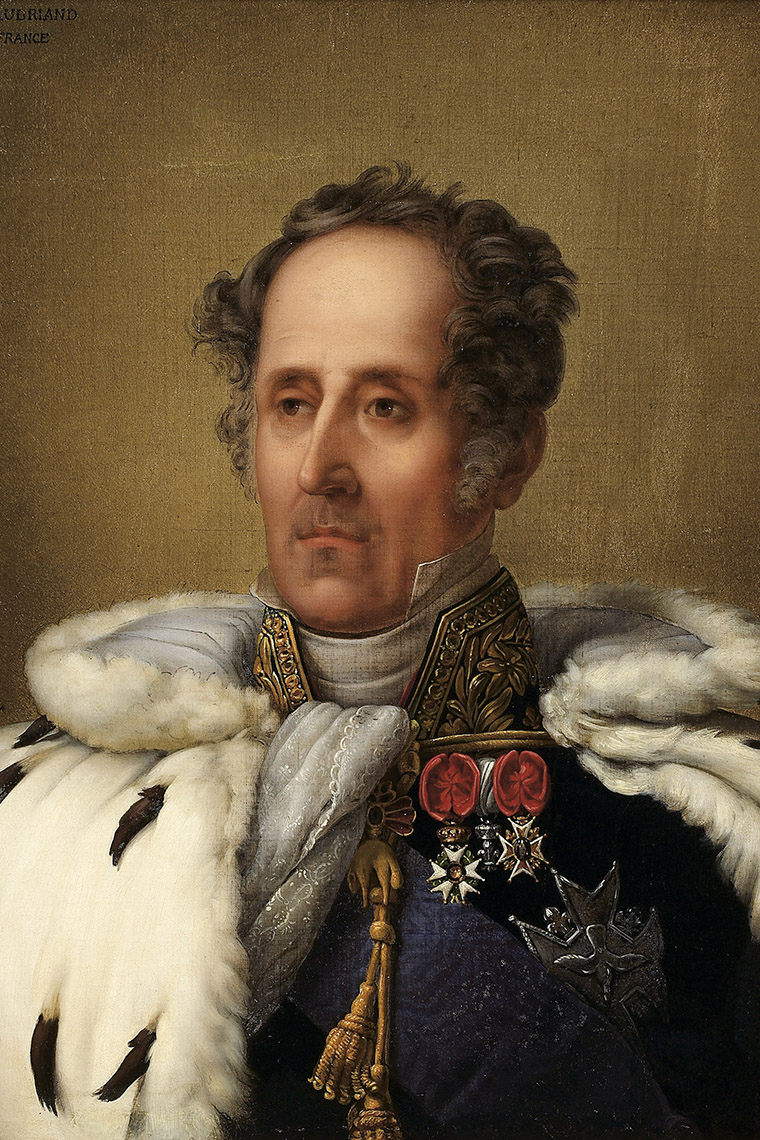
Viscount of Chateaubriand
was also very liberal on certain policies (e.g. press)

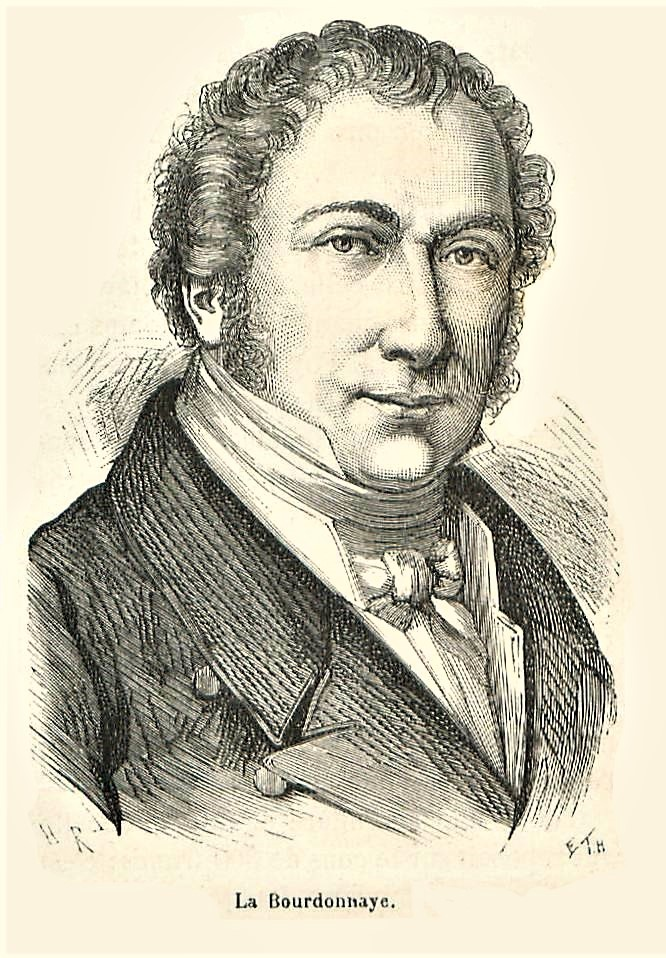
François-Régis de La Bourdonnaye

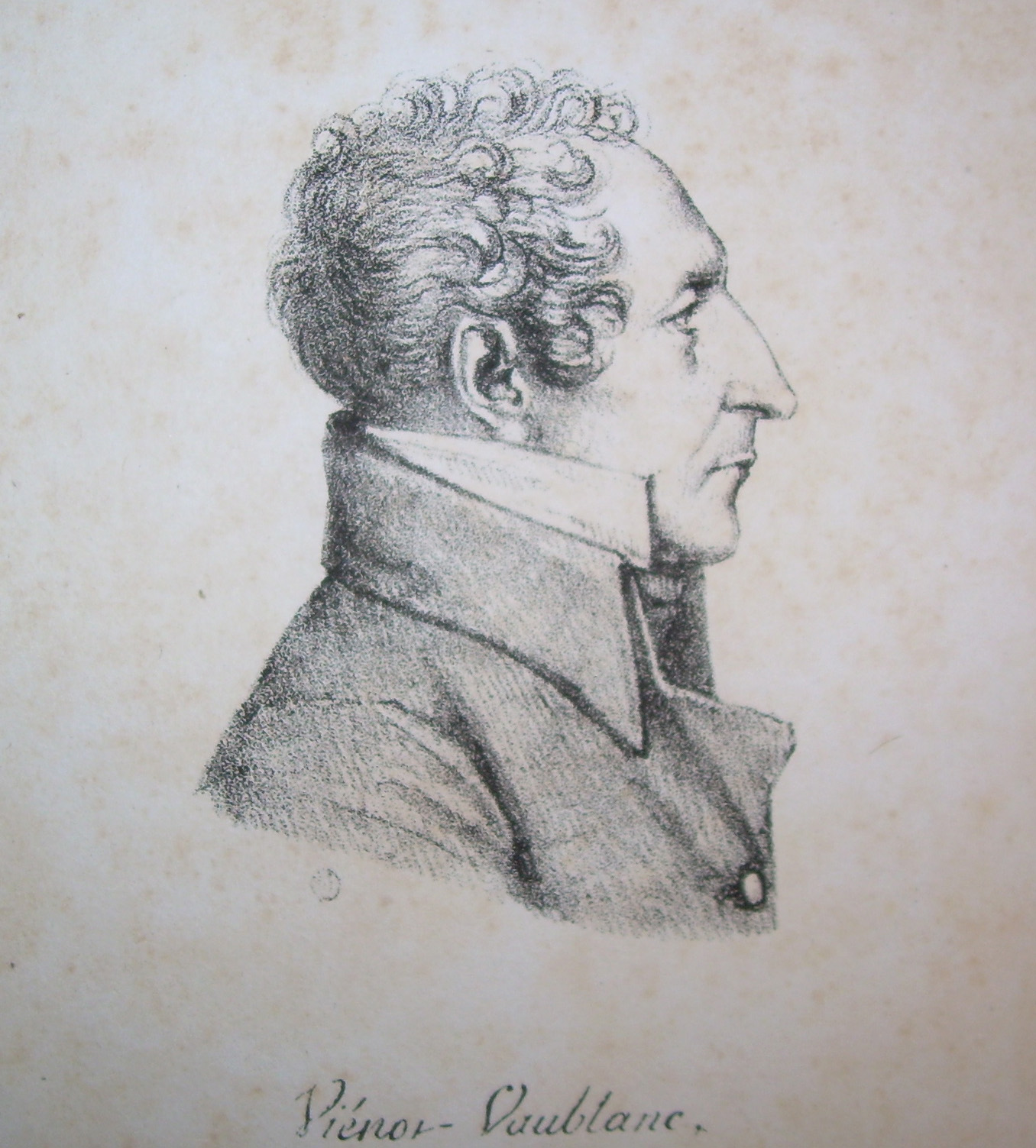
Count of Vaublanc

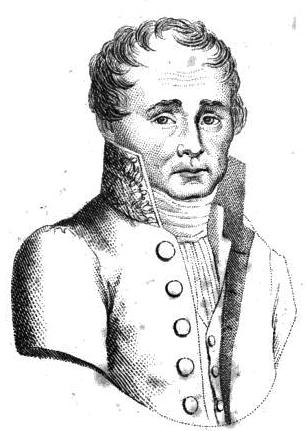
Jacques-Joseph Corbière

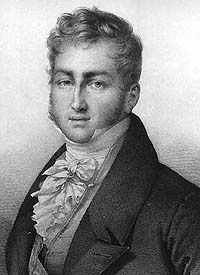
Prince Polignac

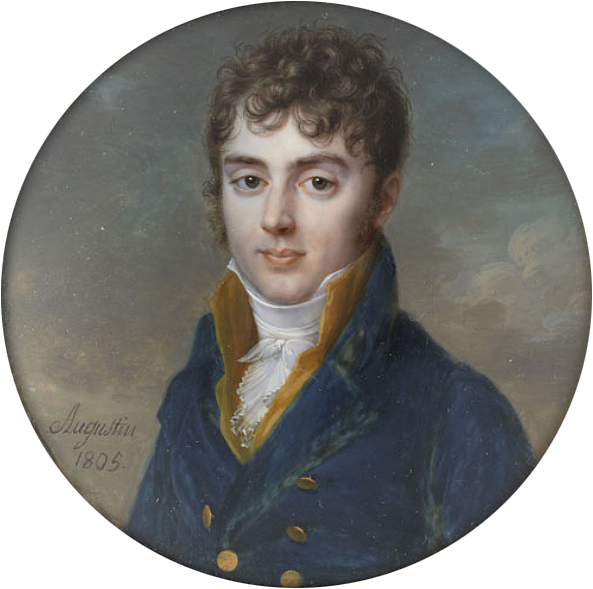
Ferdinand de Bertier de Sauvigny

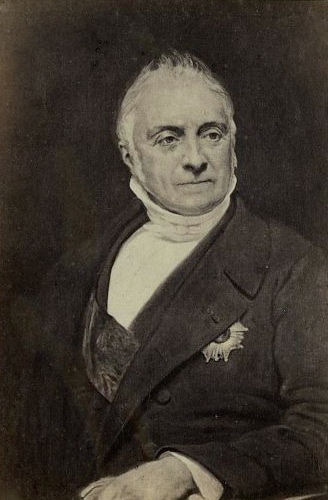
Duke of Clermont-Tonnerre

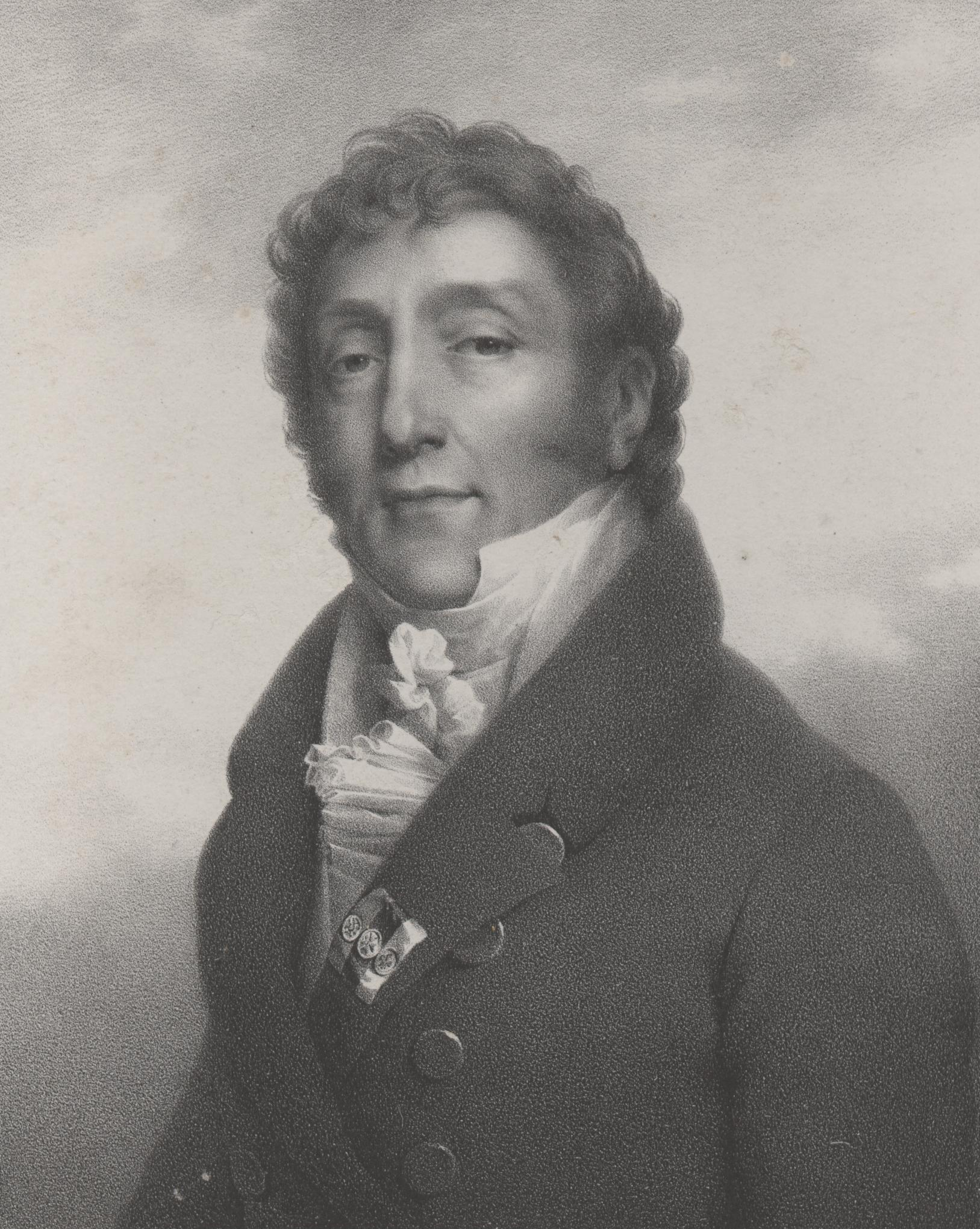
Duke of Montmorency

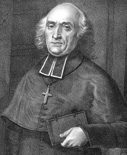
Abbé Frayssinous,
royal chapelan and peer

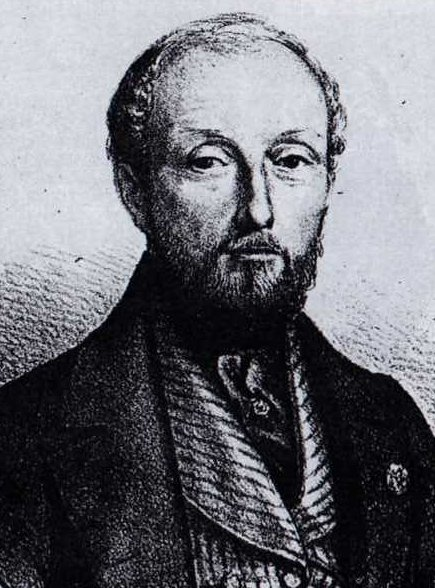
Casimir de Rochechouart

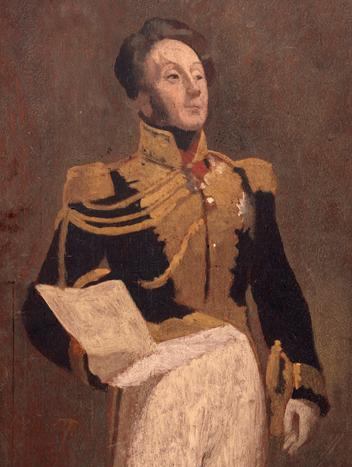
Sosthènes I de La Rochefoucauld

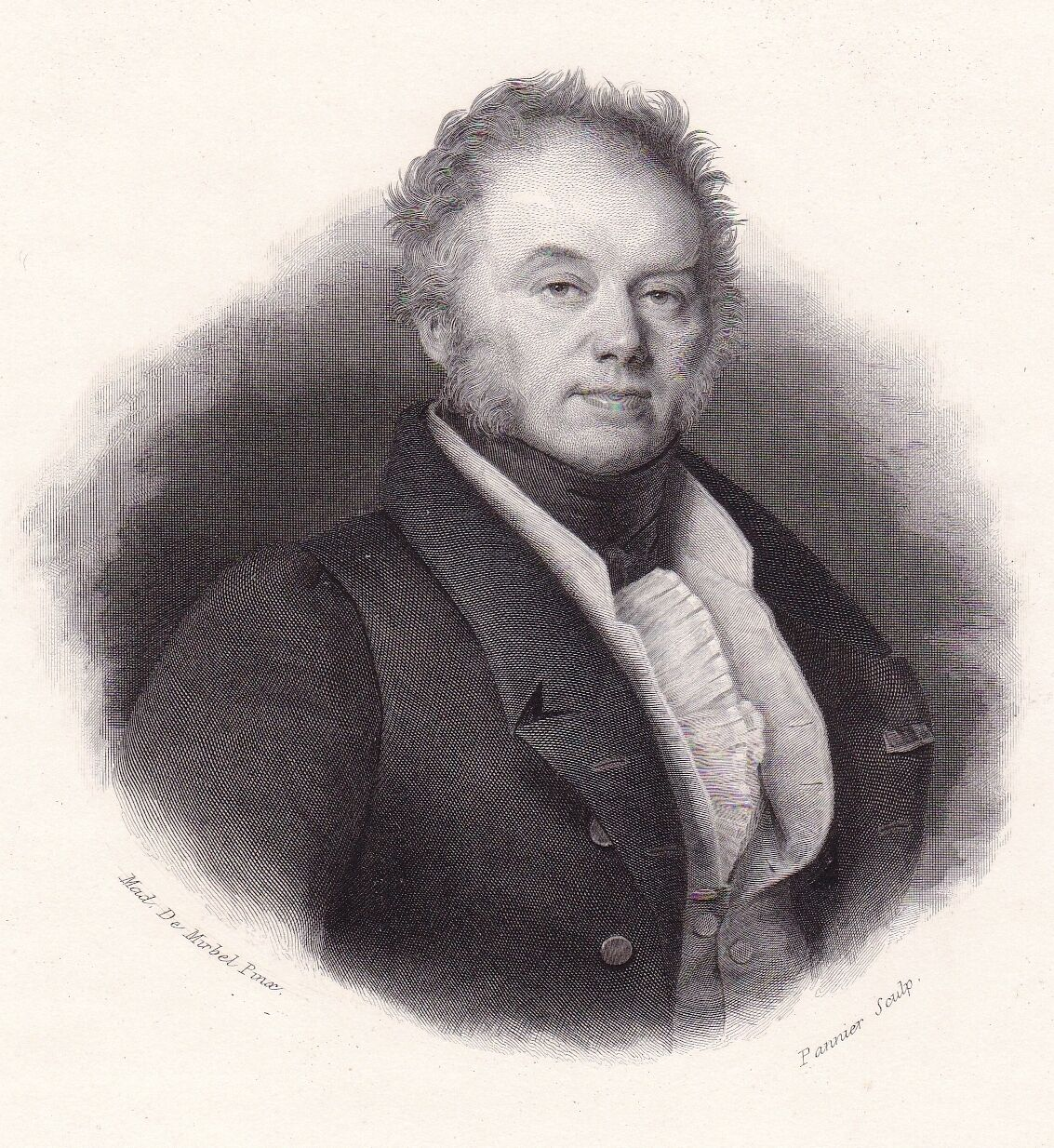
Édouard de Fitz-James
Intellectuals and patrons
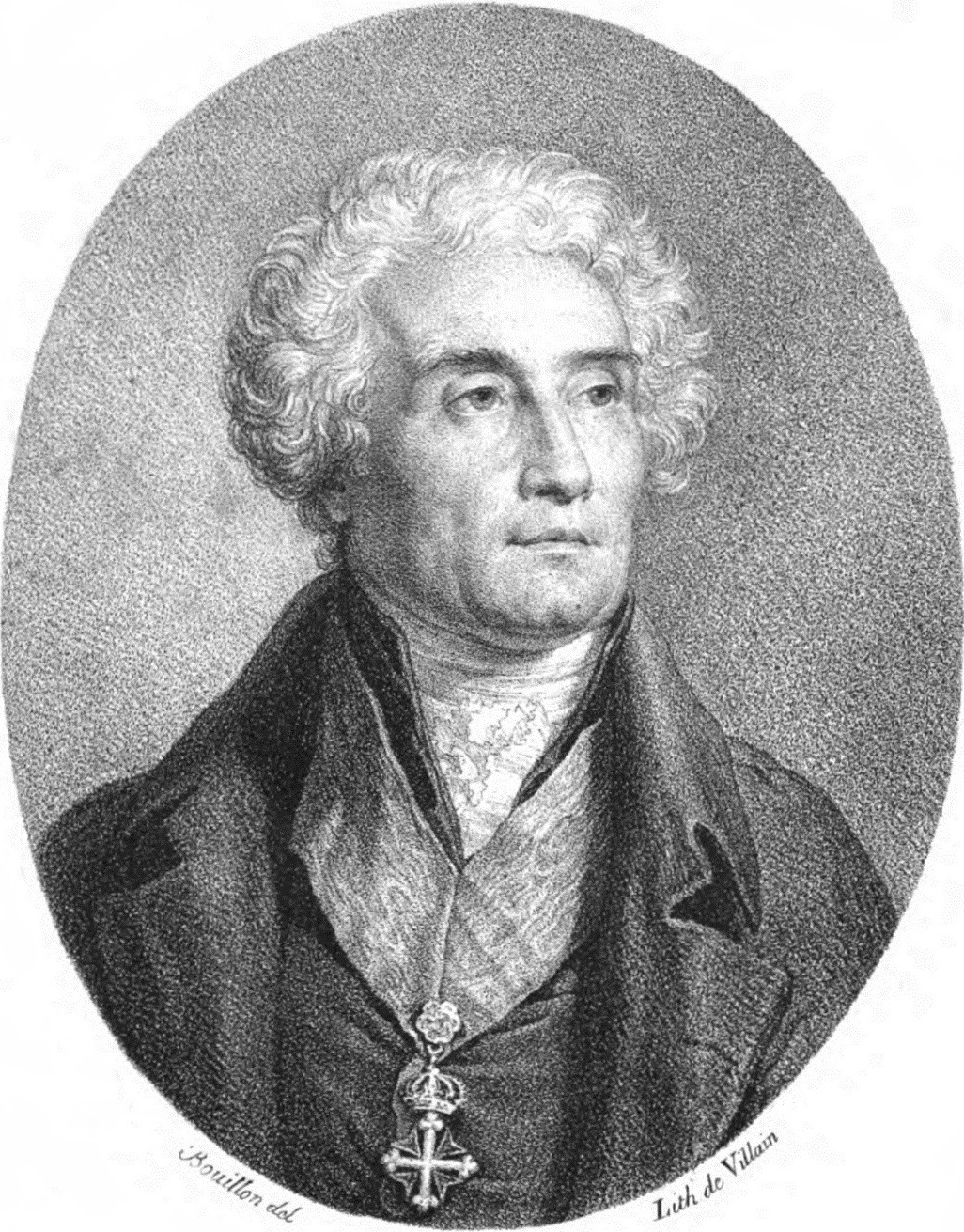
Joseph de Maistre,
chief ideologist

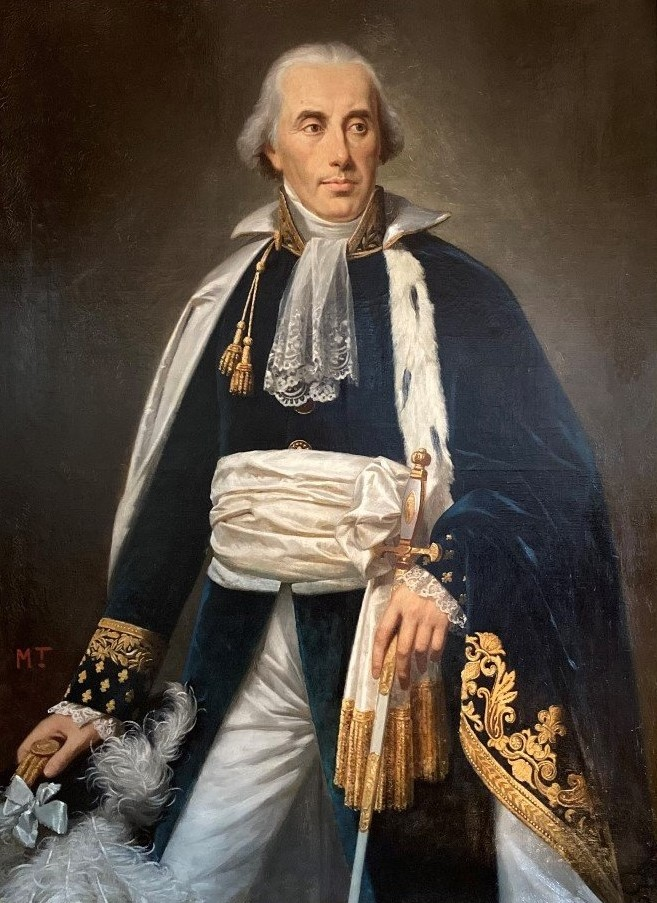
Louis de Bonald,
chief ideologist

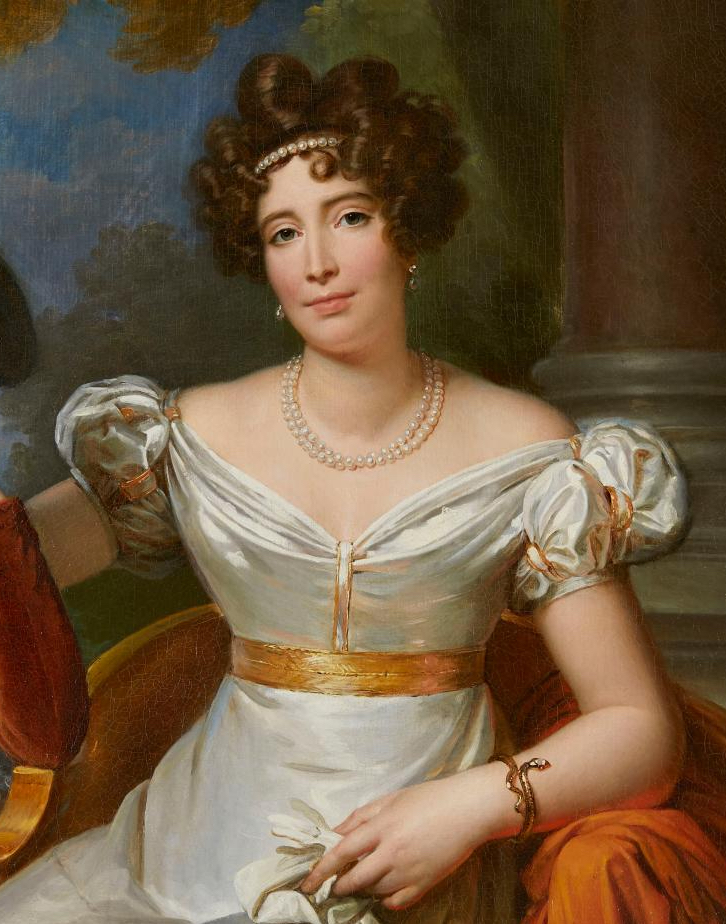
Zoé Talon,
paramour of Louis XVIII

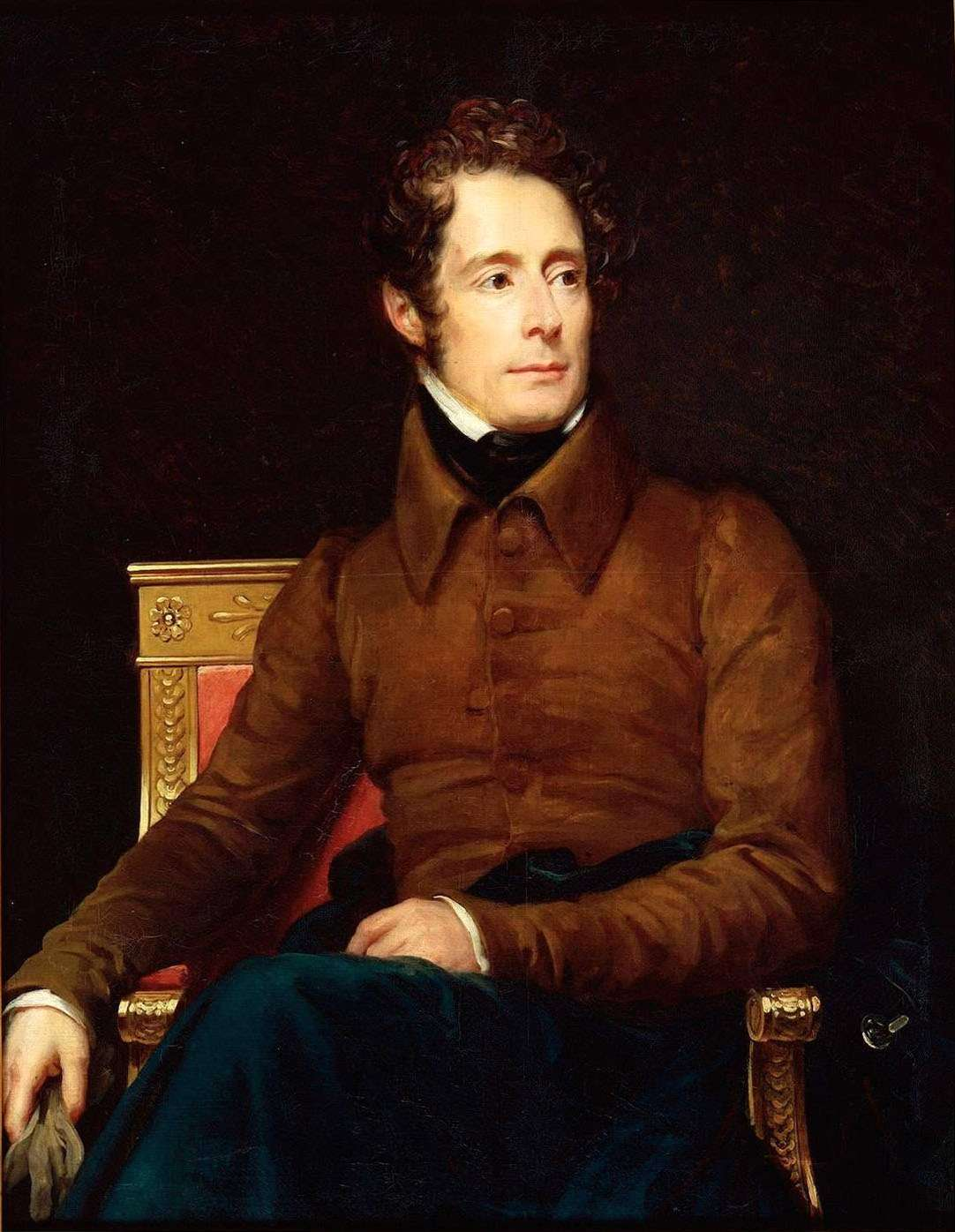
Alphonse de Lamartine,
ideologist of the liberal faction, eventually became a republican

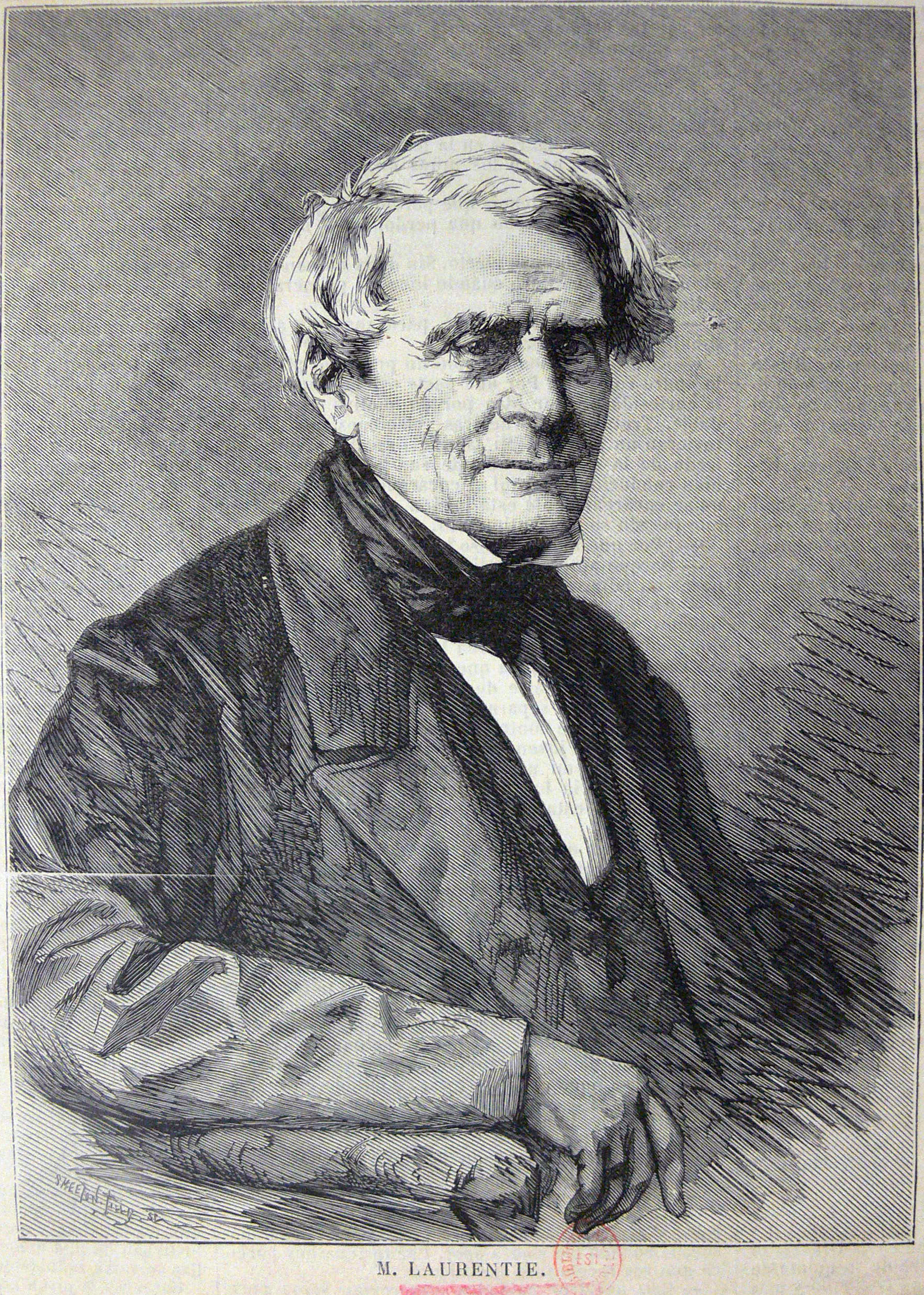
Pierre-Sébastien Laurentie

== Electoral results ==
Election year	No. of overall votes	% of overall vote	No. of overall seats won	+/–	Position	Leader
Chamber of Deputies
1815	35,200	87.5%	350 / 400	New	1st (majority)	François-Régis de La Bourdonnaye, Comte de La Bretèche
1820	34,780	36.9%	160 / 434	▼190 (Note: This change is compared to the last general election which was in August 1815. The elections in 1816, 1817, and 1819 were all by-elections and those results are included)	2nd (minority)	Jean-Baptiste Séraphin, Comte de Villèle
1824	90,240	96%	413 / 430	▲253	1st (majority)	Jean-Baptiste Séraphin, Comte de Villèle
1827	40,420	43.1%	185 / 430	▼228	1st (majority)	Jean-Baptiste Séraphin, Comte de Villèle
1830	47,940	50.7%	282 / 556	▲97	1st (majority)	Jules de Polignac, Duke de Polignac

== See also ==
- Anti-Sacrilege Act
- Legitimists
- Political parties under Restoration
- Ultra-Tories
