= Ministry of Justice (France) =

Justice ministry in France

- Ministère de la Justice

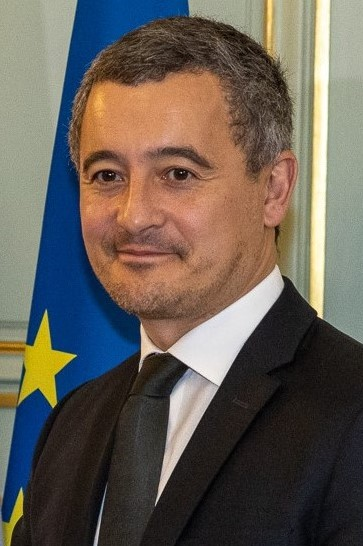
- Incumbent; Gérald Darmanin since 23 December 2024
- Style: Monsieur le ministre
- Member of: Council of Ministers
- Reports to: President of the Republic and to Parliament
- Residence: Hôtel de Bourvallais; 13, Place Vendôme
- Seat: Paris 8^{e}, France
- Appointer: President of the Republic
- Term length: No fixed term; Remains in office while commanding the confidence of the National Assembly and the President of the Republic
- Precursor: Chancellor of France
- Formation: 23 March 1791
- First holder: Jean-Marie Roland de La Platière
- Website: www.justice.gouv.fr

The Ministry of Justice (French: Ministère de la Justice) is a ministerial department of the Government of France, also known in French as la Chancellerie. It is headed by the Minister of Justice, also known as the Keeper of the Seals, a member of the Council of Ministers. The ministry's headquarters are on Place Vendôme, Paris.

== Organization ==
- Minister of Justice: The current Minister of Justice is Gérald Darmanin since December 2024.
- The Judicial Services Directorate (Direction des Services Judiciaires (known as DSJ) is responsible for the civil courts. The DSJ contributes to the drafting of texts and provides its opinion on laws being drafted and regulations that regards the courts.
- The Civil Affairs and Seals Directorate (Direction des Affaires civiles et du Sceau (DACS)
- The Criminal Matters and Pardons Directorate (Direction des affaires criminelles et des grâces) (DACG) contributes to drafting criminal justice texts that lay down the rules for proceedings, judgment, and enforcement of rulings and oversees their application.
- The Prison Administration Directorate a.k.a. French Prison Service (Direction de l'administration pénitentiaire (DAP, "Prisons Administration Directorate") ensures the execution of judicial decisions concerning persons who are the subject of a judicial measure restricting or depriving of liberty.
- The Judicial Youth Protection Directorate (Direction de la protection judiciaire de la jeunesse (DPJJ) is responsible, within the framework of the competence of the Ministry of Justice, for all questions concerning juvenile justice.
- The Inspectorate-General of the Judicial Services (Inspection Générale des Services Judiciaires (IGSJ) is in charge of inspecting the departments within the Ministry and the courts (exception the Court of Cassation).
- The General Secretariat (Secrétariat Général) assists the minister in the administration of the ministry and provides support to the departments of the ministry.

== See also ==
- Justice ministry
- Prison conditions in France
