= Parliamentary dissolution (France) =

Event that ends a parliament

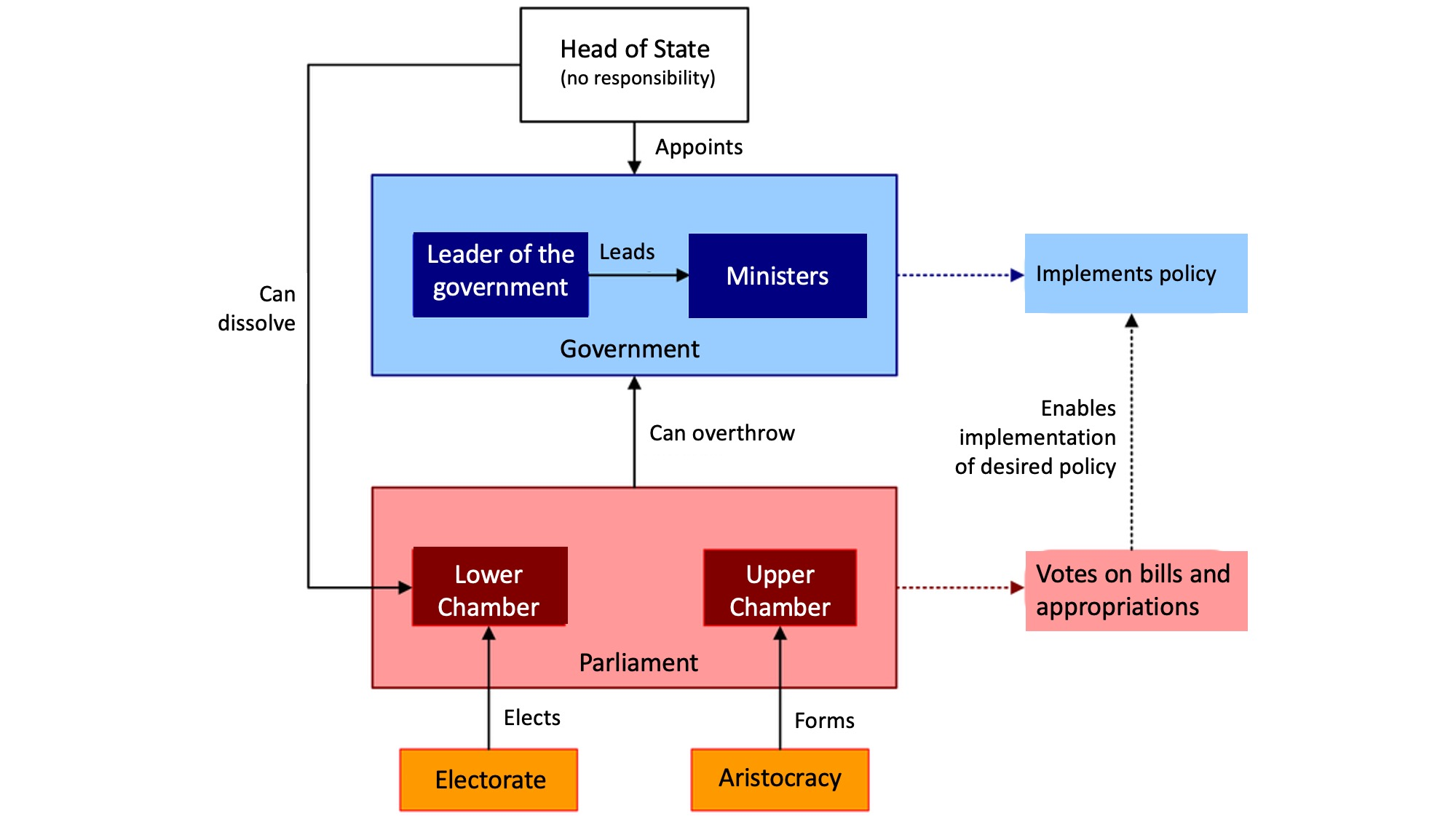
The theory of parliamentary government.

In France, the right to dissolve a chamber of parliament—i.e., prematurely terminate its term to trigger an election—has been vested in the Head of State or, in exceptional cases, the Government or even one of the chambers. Dissolutions have occurred under various regimes since 1802, including the First Empire, the Restoration, the July Monarchy and the Third, Fourth and Fifth Republics.

First introduced in the Constitution of the Year X, 1802, for the benefit of the Conservative Senate, dissolution in the truly parliamentary sense in France originated during the Restoration in Article 50 of the Charter of 1814. At first, the use of dissolution was fairly in line with parliamentary theory, before eventually becoming an authoritarian tool under Charles X. Under the July Monarchy, Article 42 of the Charter of 1830 again provided for dissolution, but this time, a genuine system of government accountability was introduced. Two procedures balanced each other out—motions of no confidence versus dissolution—enabling France to experienced its first authentic parliamentary system, where the Government became the real point of contact between the two fundamental bodies: the Monarch and the elected Chamber.

Outside the parliamentary tradition, the authoritarian regime of the Second Empire gave the Emperor the right to dissolve the Legislature.

The Constitutional Acts of 1875 took up the Orleanist mechanism of dissolution, but adapted it. However, the crisis of May 16, 1877 made the procedure tedious to the Republicans, and the tool was abandoned for the rest of the Third Republic. This created great instability in the Chamber of Deputies to develop without sanction, resulting in government instability that worsened with each decade.

In 1946, the Constituent Assembly, informed by France's recent history, retained the right of dissolution but made it automatic in the event of the chamber's instability—rather than a discretionary prerogative of the executive. The constitutional practice of the Fourth Republic showed the limits of the right of dissolution: while governments fell continuously fell, only one dissolution took place, which was in 1955. The Constitution of 1958 therefore put an end to this restriction upon dissolution: from then on, it would be a discretionary prerogative of the President of the Republic, as defined in Article 12.

However, the relative stability of parliamentary majorities since the 1962 legislative election has effectively removed the threat posed to governments by of a motion of no confidence to governments. Dissolution under the Fifth Republic thus has taken on a different use from that taught by traditional parliamentary government theory. It has only been used once to resolve a conflict between the executive and legislative branches of government, in 1962, while the other dissolutions carried out obey different logic.

== Birth of dissolution in French law: the Consulate ==
By Order of the Senate [...], the Legislative Body and the Tribunate may be dissolved. — Excerpt from Article 55 of the Constitution of the Year X, August 4, 1802.

The Constitution of the Year X established Napoleon's new government, which included the conservative Senate and the Consulate, which was composed of three parliamentary chambers:

- the Council of State, which drafted Bills;
- the Tribunate, which debated Bills but could not vote;
- the Legislative Body, which could not discuss Bills, but whose members voted on Bills after reviewing the Tribunate's debate record.

The Constitution of the Year X was also the first constitutional text to mention the possibility of ending the mandate of one of the chambers. The procedure for dissolution it set out was quite exceptional, reflecting Napoleon Bonaparte's view that his new regime was not a parliamentary one, but rather authoritarian. (Note: Morabito (2004, p. 157)) Dissolution of the Tribunate or the Legislative Body—two chambers of the tricameral parliament—was to be effectuated by Order of the conservative Senate (a "senatus consultum"), but the power to issue this directive was reserved for the First Consul, that is, Napoleon himself, (Note: Morabito (2004, p. 158)) under Article 56 of the Constitution. This appears to have been intended to ensure the subordination of chambers that already had very restricted powers, particularly since no time limit was set for convening the newly elected chamber.

== During the Restoration ==
Each year, the King shall convene the two Chambers and prorogue them. He may dissolve the Chamber of Deputies of the departments, in which case he shall convene a new Chamber within three months. — Article 50 of the Constitutional Charter of June 4, 1814.

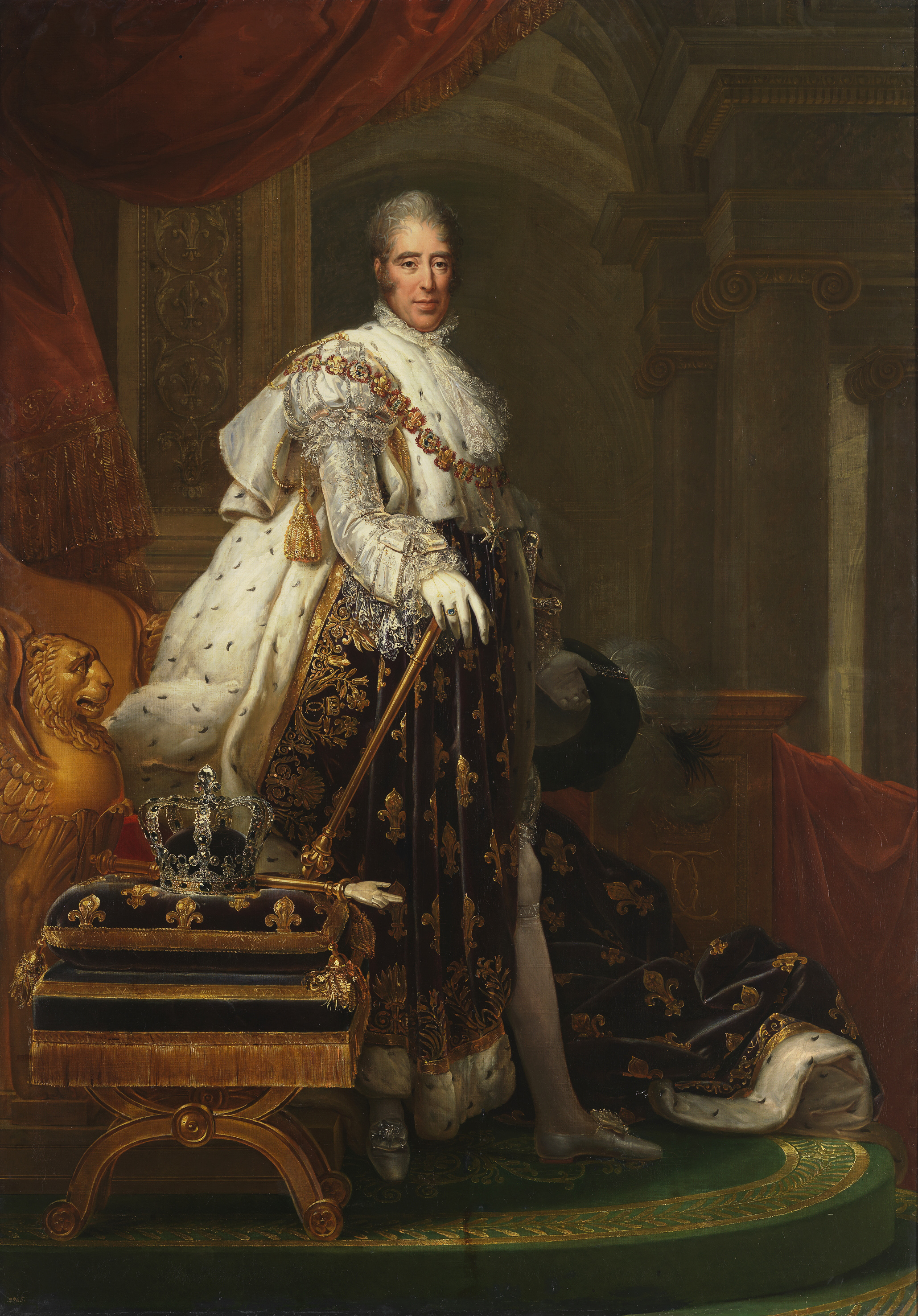
Coronation Portrait of Charles X by François Gérard, 1825, Charles X, whose stubbornness put an end to the Restoration.

The right of the Monarch to dissolve the lower chamber of parliament appeared as early as the draft constitution proposed by the Conservative Senate in April 1814. (Note: See the draft for the senatorial constitution of 6 April 1814.) The Constitutional Charter of 1814 confirmed this prerogative, which was widely accepted in circles of constitutional thought at the time. (Note: Morabito (2004, p. 179)) (Note: The draft constitution of 29 June 1815, drawn up by a committee of the short-lived Chamber of Representatives during the Hundred Days, remained unimplemented.)

It appears the drafters initially intended to guarantee the pre-eminence of the King of France and prevent the Chamber of Deputies from encroaching on his prerogatives. (Note: Morabito (2004, p. 193)) However, it soon became clear that royal pre-eminence could only be based on the lower chamber's support for the government's policies—support made difficult by the lack of organization into political parties—and therefore upon the truly parliamentary mechanism of confidence in the government. Given these conditions, resorting to dissolution to settle a conflict between the executive and legislative branches was akin to making the electorate, restricted by the system of census suffrage, "the final arbiter of institutions".

=== Dissolution before 1830 ===
The three dissolutions that took place before 1830—in 1816, 1824 and 1827—all conform to the theory of parliamentary rule. (Note: We must add that of 1815, which enabled the King to dismiss the Chamber of the Hundred Days, but it was a marginal event in the Restoration.)

The first dissolution, on 5 September 1816, occurred when the parliamentary majority became in conflict with the government. Essentially, the Chamber of Deputies elected in August 1815 (called the "Unobtainable Chamber") whose majority was ultra-royalist, wished to dominate the Richelieu government. (Note: Morabito (2004, p. 194)) To safeguard his governmental prerogatives against the grip of the parliamentary majority, Louis XVIII, urged on his Police Minister, Decazes, dissolved the lower chamber, asking the electorate to arbitrate the conflict. The election that followed was a resounding success for the King and the government.

The other two dissolutions—in 1824 and 1827—arose from a different context, in which the King used it to avert a possible conflict between the government and the lower chamber. In each case, Charles X wished to protect the Villèle government, whose survining majority had been weakened by political circumstances. The 1824 election supported the Villèle government, but that of 1827 brought in a moderate majority. For this, the King drew the only logical political consequence, and he appointed a moderate, who would head the Martignac government.

=== Authoritarian drift: the last dissolution of 1830 ===
In August 1829, Charles X dismissed the moderate Martignac government, instead appointing ultra-royalist Jules de Polignac to head a new government. To resolve the conflict between the moderate Chamber of Deputies and the ultra-royalist government, the King appealed to the electorate on 16 May 1830, in keeping with parliamentary tradition.

However, typical parliamentary thinking was undermined when Charles X refused to accept the result of the 1830 election, which favoured the moderates. The King, politically opposed by his own electorate, therefore this powers under Article 14 of the Charter of 1814 (Note: This article stipulates that "The King [...] shall issue the regulations and ordinances necessary for [...] the security of the State", a provision interpreted as allowing the King to legislate without the involvement of Parliament when necessary Morabito (2004, p. 172).) to issue the four "Saint-Cloud Ordinances" on 25 July 1830, one of which dissolved the newly elected Chamber of Deputies before it had even met. (Note: Morabito (2004, p. 197)) However, this dissolution never took place, due to the "Three Glories" revolution of 1830.

By refusing to accept the verdict of the ballot box in 1830, Charles X imposed an authoritarian vision of the system born in 1814, in which dissolution lost its parliamentary credibility, becoming nothing more than a tool for dominating the lower chamber. This gave rise to a veritable constitutional deadlock, which would ultimately be resolved by the 1980 revolution.

== During the July Monarchy ==
Each year, the King shall convene the two Chambers and prorogue them. He may dissolve the Chamber of Deputies, in which case he shall convene a new Chamber within three months. — Article 42 of the Constitutional Charter, August 14, 1830.

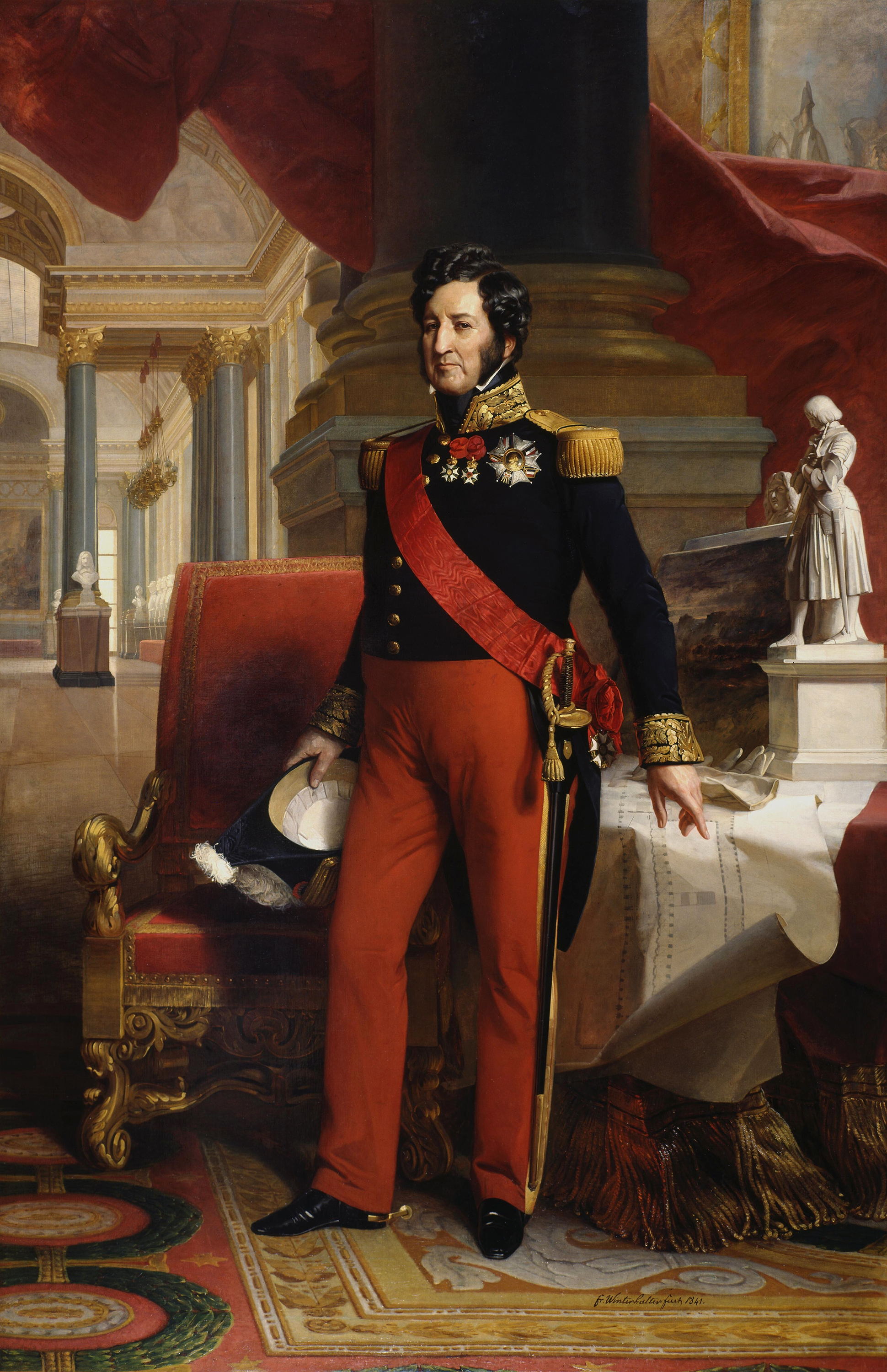
Portrait of Louis Philippe I by Franz Xaver Winterhalter, 1841. King Louis-Philippe I, France's first truly parliamentary Monarch.

The text of the Charter of August 14, 1830 remained largely unchanged from that of its predecessor, with only minor alterations. (Note: Morabito (2004, p. 196)) The main change lay in its novel interpretation, for where Louis XVIII had firmly intended to "bestow" the Charter of 1814, Louis-Philippe I used the Charter of 1930 to create a "pact" with the nation. (Note: Chevallier (2001, p. 208)) The monarchical legitimacy of Louis-Philippe I's reign remains controversial—some believed that he, being a Bourbon, (Note: Chevallier (2001, p. 209)) had a blood right to rule (Guizot), while others thought his legitimacy stemmed from the people, in spite of any blood right from being a Boubon (Dupin). (Note: Chevallier (2001, p. 210)) But both theories agreed that the new Charter was a pact between the King and his country, rather than a unilateral imposition of his will. (Note: Morabito (2004, p. 200))

The general institutional spirit was transformed by the circumstances in which the Charter was conceived: the negation of national sovereignty represented by the Charter of 1814 was replaced by a regime born of revolution and an appeal by the elected chamber to another sovereign. Henceforth, two distinct centers of power emerged: the King and the elected chamber. As the Charter of 1830 was substantially no more detailed than its predecessor, this new interpretation of a compromise was primarily a result of new political practice, but the essence of the regime was clearly parliamentary.

=== Use consistent with parliamentary theory ===
Use of dissolution abounded in the July Monarchy. Indeed, no legislature ever completed its normal five-year term. (Note: Chevallier (2001, p. 227)) Six dissolutions occurred: (Note: For all dates, the source is Morabito (2004, pp. 197–198).)

- 31 May 1831 (election of 1831); (Note: These elections were decided not for political reasons, but to immediately implement the new electoral law, which introduced an extended system of censal suffrage.)
- 25 May 1834 (election of 1834);
- 3 October 1837 (election of 1837);
- 2 February 1839 (election of 1839);
- 13 June 1842 (election of 1842);
- 6 July 1846 (election of 1846).

These numerous dissolutions never drew any protests from the country despite the intensive use of the procedure, which could have been construed as abuse. Dissolution was often carried out on the initiative of the government, which could thus choose the most opportune moment to hold new elections, a use largely aligned with British-style parliamentarism.

=== Dissolution stripped of its political power ===
However, despite its frequent use, the right of dissolution had little effect beyond the holding of the elections themselves. (Note: Morabito (2004, p. 227)) With the exception of the 1846 election, governments that should have benefited from dissolution—thanks to strengthened majorities sufficient to carry out their policies—actually emerged from elections weaker than they had entered them.

The main cause of this ineffectiveness was the inorganization of political parties: unlike the English model, dominated at the time by Whigs and Conservatives, French regimes were hampered by an absence of parties—which could have structured the vote, the chamber's composition and clear political options—thus resulting in a confused electorate.

The electoral disorganization resulted in an absence of a stable majority until 1840, and the futility, in almost all cases, of elections, which failed to produce a clear majority to carry out definite policy. The only "successful" dissolution, in 1846, which gave the Guizot government a strengthened conservative majority, was a paradoxical failure: due to the system of censal suffrage, the chamber was hardly representative of the country's real political trends. The result was that, backed by a firm majority, Guizot's conservative and immobilist policy on electoral law eventually became unbearable for the "real country", which revolted in the Revolution of 1848.

== During Bonaparte's Second Republic and the Second Empire ==
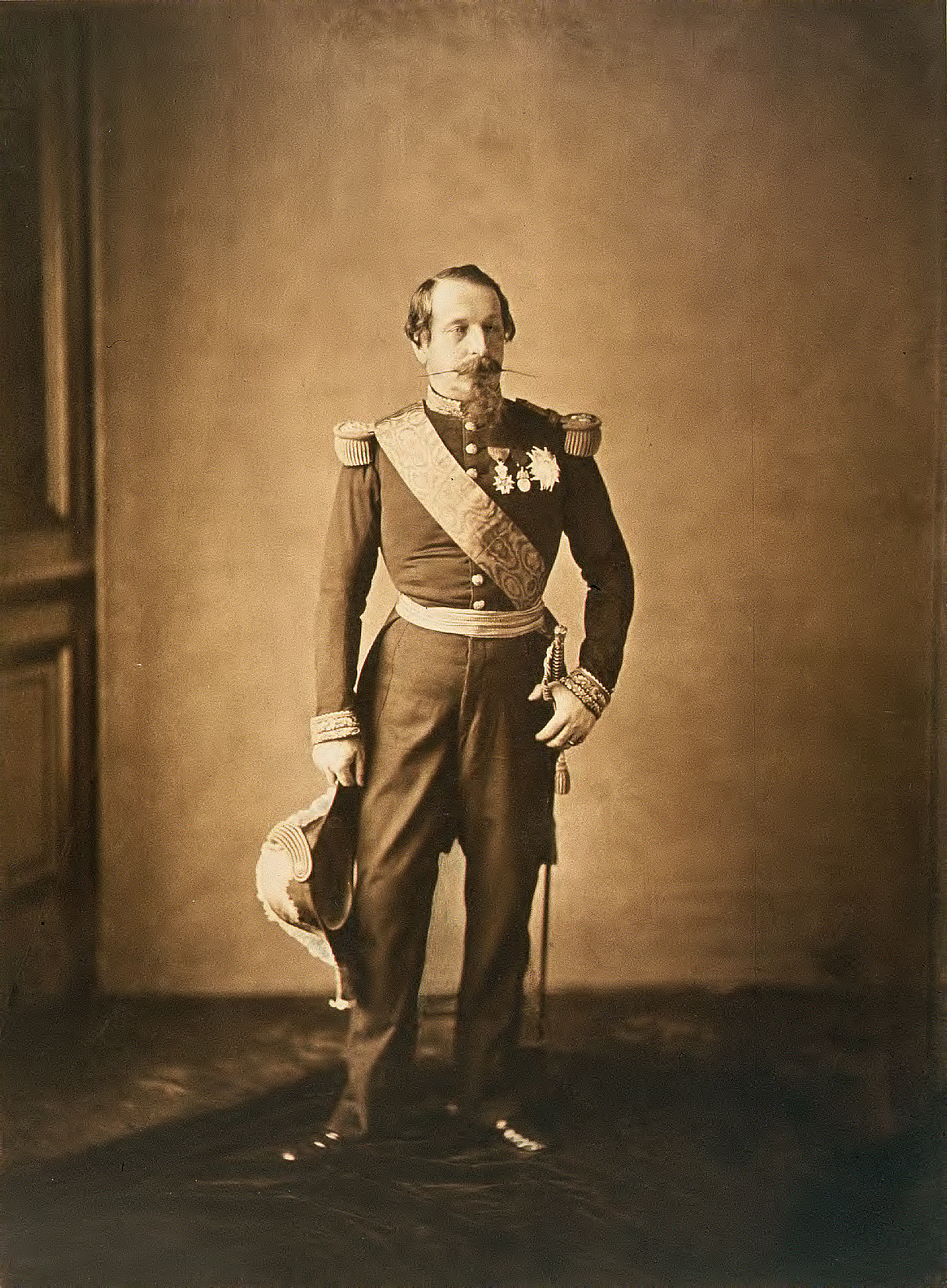
Emperor Napoleon III, circa 1860.

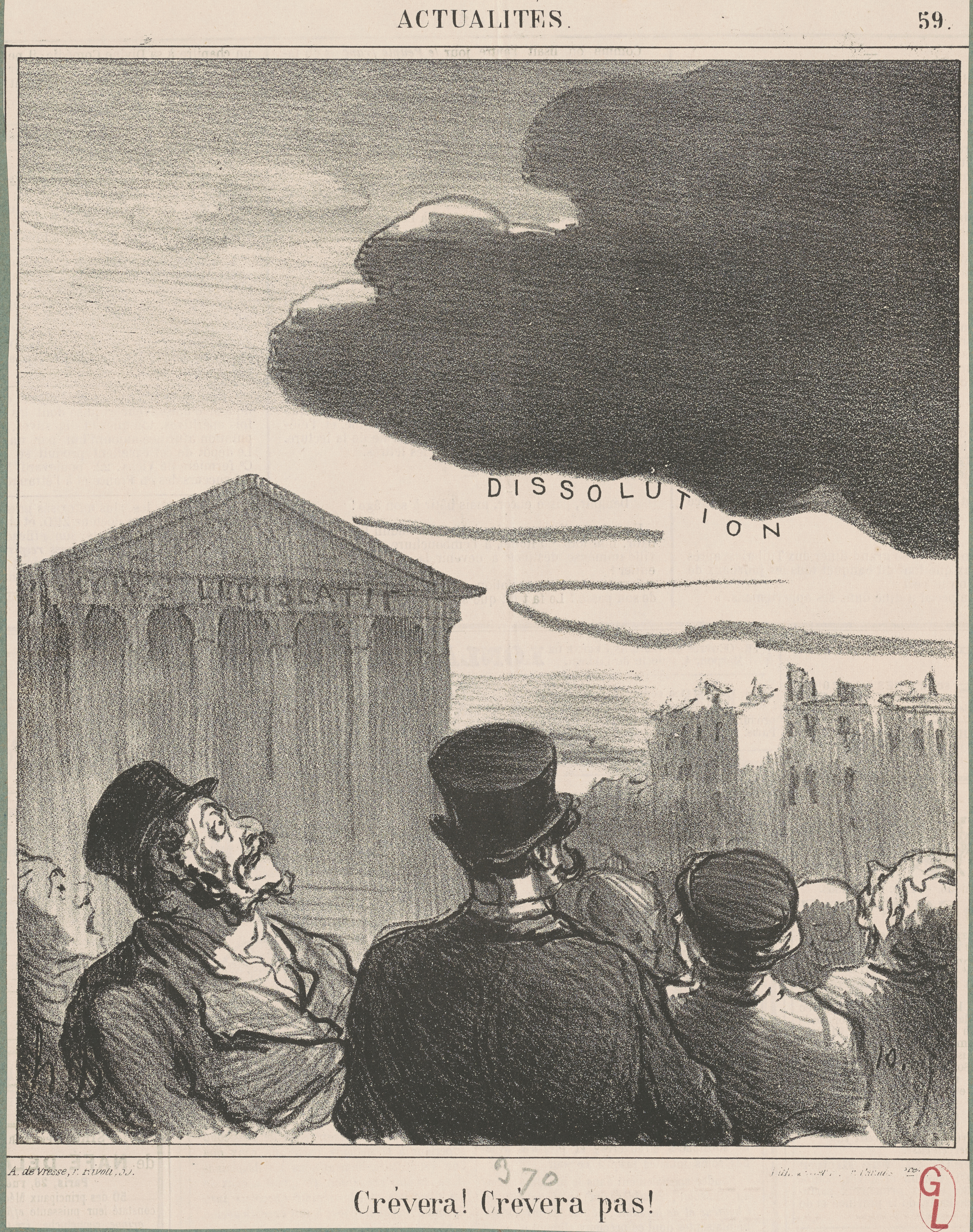
"We'll die! We won't die!" A black cloud of dissolution, depicted in a cartoon by Honoré Daumier, in the "Current Affairs" series in Le Charivari, March 12, 1870.

Although completely absent from the Constitution of 1848, the right of dissolution reappeared in the new constitution drafted by Louis-Napoléon Bonaparte, based on the referendum that immediately followed the Coup d'état of December 2, 1851. The establishment of the Second Empire at the end of 1852 did not change the constitutional texts: the text of 14 January 1852, which established the "decennial republic", (Note: So-named because the President of the Republic was elected for a ten-year term. The proclamation of the Second Empire put an end to this regime after just ten months.) remained in force, modified by the Order of the Senate on November 7, 1852.

The President of the Republic may convene, adjourn, prorogue and dissolve the Legislative Body. In the event of dissolution, he shall convene a new Legislative Body within six months.

— Article 46 of the Constitution of January 14, 1852.

In the event of dissolution of the Legislative Body, and until a new one is convened, the Senate, on the motion of the President of the Republic, shall provide, by emergency measures, all that is necessary for the operations of the government.

— Article 33 of the Constitution of January 14, 1852.

Between 1852 and 1870, numerous constitutional amendments were adopted. However, during this period, the only change concerning dissolution was the people's adoption of a new constitution, following the referendum of May 8, 1870: the "Order of the Senate dated May 21, 1870, establishing the Constitution of the Empire". This new text made only a slight change to the one in force since 1852, by abolishing the Senate's right to take emergency measures to meet the needs of the State, until the Legislative Body was convened after its dissolution. Thus, the Constitution of 1870 established a truly egalitarian bicameralism between the two chambers. (Note: Morabito (2004, p. 276))

The Emperor may convene, adjourn, prorogue and dissolve the Legislative Body.

In the event of dissolution, the Emperor shall convene a new one within six months.

The Emperor shall declare the close of each session of the Legislative Body.

— Article 35 of the Order of the Senate on May 21, 1870, establishing the Constitution of the Empire.

Due to the various procedures implemented to "neutralize" universal suffrage and make it conform to the wishes of political power (such as "official candidacies"), the Legislative Body was never a dangerous chamber for the Government. It was dissolved only once, in 1857. (Note: Morabito (2004, p. 248)) Napoleon III wished to shorten the term of the first Legislative Body by one year to demonstrate to the whole of Europe that the imperial regime's popularity.

== During the Third Republic ==
Article 5 of the Constitutional Act of February 25, 1875 provided for the dissolution of the National Assembly:

The President of the Republic may, with leave of the Senate, dissolve the Chamber of Deputies before the legal expiry of its term of office.

In such case, the electoral colleges shall be convened for a new election within three months."

— Article 5 of the Constitutional Act of February 25, 1875, on the organization of public powers.

=== Emergence of dissolution in a republican regime ===
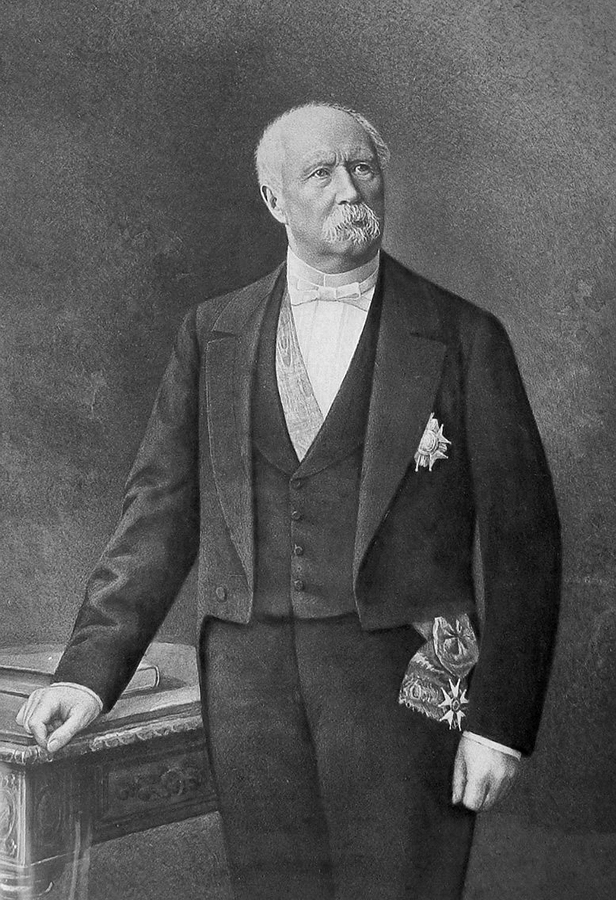
Official portrait of President Mac Mahon, initiator of the crisis of 16 May 1877.

This was the first time that a republican regime in France provided for the right of dissolution, which favoured executive authority over a popularly-elected chamber. This power was a direct "import" from the Charter of 1830, from which the Constitutional Acts were inspired. (Note: Morabito (2004, p. 305)) The "three-month" time limit itself reflects a similar provision from Article 42 of the Charter of 1830.

The novel feature of dissolution under the Third Republic was the very important role played by the Senate, which had the power to authorize or refuse dissolution. It was thus placed in the position of arbiter in conflicts between the President and the Chamber of Deputies. This solution may have seemed to temper the exorbitant power, in the eyes of the Republicans, given to the President of the Republic—and significantly, the amendment requiring Senate authorization came from Henri Wallon, "the father of the Republic"—but above all, it made the possibility of dissolution highly unlikely if the majorities of the two chambers concurred.

=== Crisis of 16 May 1877: first and last uses of dissolution ===
This prerogative, fundamental in a parliamentary system, was only used once under the Third Republic, during the crisis of May 16, 1877, by President Mac Mahon. While the dissolution was in line with the letter and spirit of the Orleanist Constitution, (Note: Morabito (2004, p. 311)) it was seen by the Republicans as an attempted Coup d'état by the monarchists, as it followed the chambers' refusal to confirm governments chosen by the President of the Republic from the monarchist side.

Dissolution—"burdened with a suspicion of anti-republicanism" (Note: Chevallier (2001, p. 318)) and frowned upon by the Republicans—was abandoned by the Third Republic, and timidly reintroduced by the Fourth. On 6 February 1879, the newly elected President Jules Grévy, in his message to the Chambers thanking them for his election as President of the Republic that same year, famously said: "I will never fight the national will expressed by her constitutional bodies."

Henceforth, with a majority Republican senate as of 5 January 1879 and a Republican president, the right of dissolution fell into oblivion, so radically altering the interpretation of the constitution that it became known as the "Grévy Constitution". Without the protection of dissolution, the government found itself constantly under attack by both chambers of parliament, and it was here that the Third Republic's instability took root.

After 1918, French constitutional thinkers, faced with a profound crisis of regime, occasionally proposed to reintroduce dissolution into political practice, by freeing it from the requirement of Senate approval, or even entrusting it to the President of the Council, as seen in Gaston Doumergue's Plan to Reform the State. These proposed reforms were never adopted.

== During the Fourth Republic ==
=== Dissolution in the April draft constitution ===
The first constitutional draft drawn up by the First Constituent Assembly included two hypotheses for dissolution. Firstly, Article 84 of the draft provided for a mechanism roughly equivalent to that of Article 51 of the Constitution of 1946, (Note: Maintaining a binding procedure in the final constitution.) whereby the occurrence of two crises in the same annual session—under the conditions set out by the Constitution—could have resulted in the dissolution of a single chamber, provided at least half of its term had already elapsed. This dissolution would have been decided by the Council of Ministers, then finalized by Order of the President of the Republic. (Note: Morabito (2004, pp. 379–380)) Moreover, as seen in the Constitution's final text, dissolution by a government would only dismiss the President of the Council and the Minister of the Interior, whereas in the draft, it would actually have caused a government to cease to exist entirely.

Article 83 of the draft Constitution provided for a unique procedure:

The National Assembly shall have the right to declare its dissolution by a resolution adopted by a two-thirds majority of the deputies. —Article 83 of the draft Constitution, April 19, 1946.

The use of such a procedure would have been nonsensical: the Assembly attempting to resolve deep divisions through agreement of a significant majority.

A proposal for dissolution would have fallen, directly or indirectly, to the Chamber alone, for the right to dissolve was in no way seen as a means for the government to protect itself from the Chamber.

=== Maintaining a binding procedure in the final constitution ===
Dissolution of the National Assembly only, not of the Council of the Republic, is provided for in two articles:

If, during the same eighteen-month period, two government crises occur under the conditions provided for in articles 49 and 50, the Council of Ministers, after consultation with the Speaker of the Assembly, may decide to dissolve the National Assembly. A dissolution in accordance with such decision shall be declared by Order of the President of the Republic.

The provisions of the preceding paragraph only apply if the first eighteen months of the term of the legislature have expired.

—Article 51 of the Constitution of 1946.

In the event of dissolution, the Cabinet, with the exception of the President of the Council and the Minister of the Interior, shall remain in office to carry out routine operations.

The President of the Republic shall appoint the Speaker of the National Assembly as President of the Council, who shall, with agreement of the National Assembly Office, appoint a new Minister of the Interior, and, from among members of groups not represented in the government, the Ministers of State.

A general election shall be held at least twenty days and at most thirty days after the dissolution.

The National Assembly shall meet de jure on the third Thursday following its election.

—Article 52 of the Constitution of 1946.

==== Highly complex procedure ====
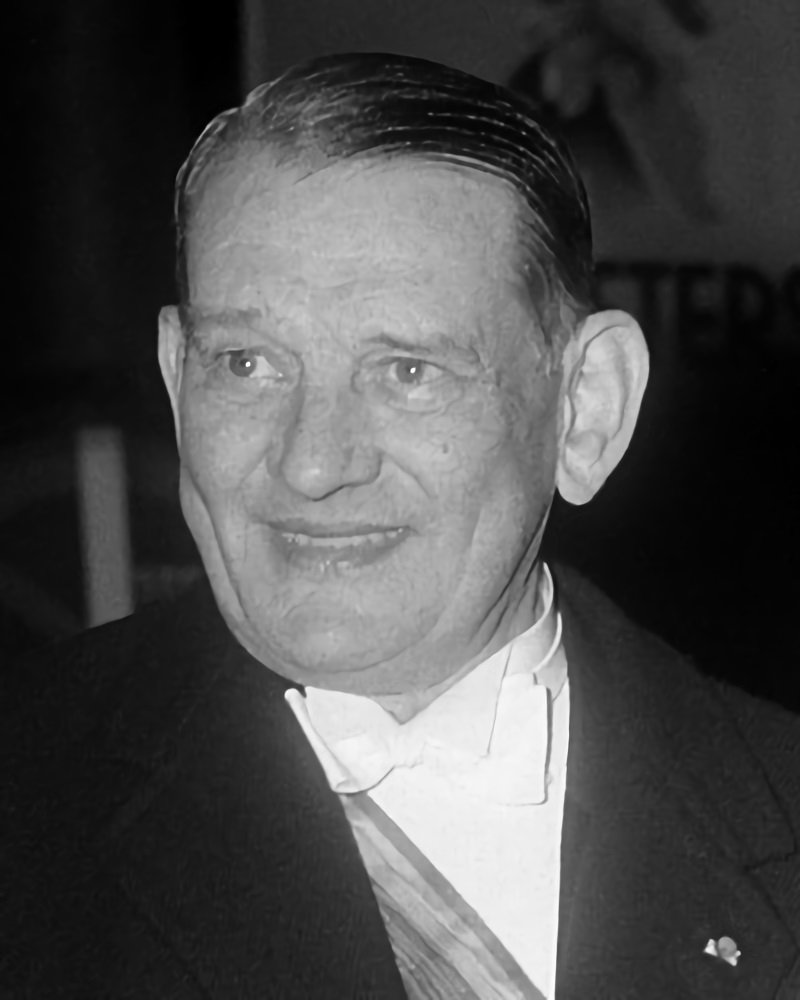
René Coty, first President to sign an Order dissolving an elected chamber since 1877.

In reaction to the excesses of the Third Republic—made possible In part by the de facto disappearance of the right of dissolution after the crisis of May 16, 1877—the 1946 Constituent Assembly provided for a right of dissolution, both in the draft April Constitution, rejected by referendum, (Note: In articles 83 to 85, see Projet de constitution française du 19 avril 1946.) (Note: Morabito (2004, p. 389)) and then in the draft October Constitution, eventually accepted.

However, unlike the Constitutional Acts of 1875, dissolution was not a discretionary power of the Head of State; it was the prerogative of the Council of Ministers, but could only be exercised if two conditions were met: (1) at least two government crises had occurred during the same eighteen-month period, under the conditions set out in articles 49 and 50 of the Constitution, and (2) it was beyond the first eighteen months of the legislature's term. This represented a "technical refinement" (Note: Chevallier (2001, p. 640)) of dissolution, but also a genuine, almost automatic "mechanism" that had nothing in common with traditional parliamentary dissolution, a counterweight to government responsibility.

It should also be noted that dissolution was a unique weapon of mutually-assured destruction, for dissolving the National Assembly meant the President of the Council had to resign, to be replaced by the Speaker of the dissolved Assembly. The deputies feared that the retention of the President of the Council who had dissolved the Chamber would influence the forthcoming election. This provision shows that dissolution was not conceived as a way of putting an end to conflict between the government and the Chamber, but as a way of helping the National Assembly out of an inextricable situation, in which no majority could be reached.

==== Mechanism incapable of ending government instability ====
This highly mechanical approach to dissolution had one major drawback, for it make the government essentially defenseless against the whims of the Chamber, which could only be dissolved if very specific conditions were met. In practice, these conditions rendered dissolution useless.

The institutional practice inherited from the Third Republic soon took over. Governments lacked the courage to stand up to the National Assembly, while constitutional mechanisms of censure were not used. In particular, a "vote of confidence", which is constitutionally framed, was rarely put by the President of the Council, who preferred simply to warn that, if the Assembly did not vote as he requested, he would resign. (Note: Morabito (2004, p. 397)) This "pseudo-question of confidence" (Note: Morabito (2004, p. 398)) prevented the demise of a government, despite having been provoked by the Chamber, from being counted as a government crisis under Article 51.

The National Assembly used the "calibrated vote" method to refuse confidence with a smaller majority than that provided for by the Constitution, to show the government that it disavowed it, without the fall provoked being counted. In this case, the weight of the Third Republic tradition and custom can be seen.

The thus hijacked Constitution, already ill-prepared for the task, no longer protected the government. Despite record government instability—24 governments in eleven years, with increasingly long periods of crisis between each, taking up to a month to form a new government—only one dissolution took place, on 1 December 1955, when Edgar Faure was President of the Council.

== Table summarizing use of dissolution before the Fifth Republic ==
Summary table of dissolutions prior to 1958
Date of dissolution	Author of dissolution	New elections	Legislature		Name of dissolved chamber	Reference
Date of dissolution	Author of dissolution	New elections	Previous (election date)	New	Name of dissolved chamber	Reference
Restoration (1815–1830)
13 July 1815	Louis XVIII, King of France	August 14 and 28, 1815	Chamber of the Hundred Days (May 1815)	The "Unobtainable Chamber" (First legislature)	Chamber of Representatives	(Note: Morabito (2004, p. 182))
5 September 1816	Louis XVIII, King of France	September 25, and October 4, 1816	"Unobtainable Chamber" (1815)	Second legislature	Chamber of Deputies	
24 December 1823	Louis XVIII, King of France	February 25, and March 6, 1824	Third Legislature (1820)	Fourth legislature ("Rediscovered Chamber")	Chamber of Deputies	
5 November 1827	Charles X, King of France	November 17 and 24, 1827	Fourth legislature (1824)	Fifth legislature	Chamber of Deputies	
16 May 1830	Charles X, King of France	July 5, 13 and 19, 1830	Fifth legislature (1827)	Sixth legislature, First legislature of the July Monarchy^{1}	Chamber of Deputies	
25 July 1830	Charles X, King of France	None^{2}	Sixth legislature (1830)	None	Chamber of Deputies	
July Monarchy (1830–1848)
31 May 1831	Louis-Philippe I, King of the French	July 5, 1831	First legislature (1830)	Second legislature	Chamber of Deputies	
25 May 1834	Louis-Philippe I, King of the French	June 21, 1834	Second legislature (1831)	Third Legislature	Chamber of Deputies	
3 October 1837	Louis-Philippe I, King of the French	November 4, 1837	Third legislature (1834)	Fourth legislature	Chamber of Deputies	(Note: Morabito (2004, p. 198))
2 February 1839	Louis-Philippe I, King of the French	March 2 and 6, 1839	Fourth legislature (1837)	Fifth legislature	Chamber of Deputies	
13 June 1842	Louis-Philippe I, King of the French	July 9, 1842	Fifth legislature (1839)	Sixth Legislature	Chamber of Deputies	
6 July 1846	Louis-Philippe I, King of the French	August 1, 1846	Sixth legislature (1842)	Seventh legislature	Chamber of Deputies	
Second Republic (1848–1852)
24 February 1848^{3}	Interim government	April 23 and 24, 1848	Seventh legislature of the July Monarchy (1846)	National Constituent Assembly	Chamber of Deputies	(Note: Morabito (2004, p. 215))
Second Empire (1852–1870)
29 May 1857	Napoleon III, Emperor of the French	June 21 and July 5, 1857	First legislature (1852)	Second legislature	Legislative Body	(Note: Morabito (2004, p. 249))
Third Republic (1870–1940)
4 September 1870^{4}	Government of National Defense	February 8, 1871^{5}	Third legislature (1869)	National Constituent Assembly	Legislative Body	
25 June 1877^{6}	Patrice de Mac-Mahon, President of the French Republic	October 14 and 28, 1877	First legislature (1876)	Second legislature	Chamber of Deputies	(Note: Morabito (2004, p. 310))
Fourth Republic (1946–1958)
1 December 1955	Edgar Faure government	January 2, 1956	Second parliament (1951)	Third legislature	National Assembly	
Notes
1. The July 1830 chamber—which was immediately dissolved by the King before even convening—should have been the sixth legislature of the Restoration. After the dissolution order was declared null and void following the Revolution of July 1830, the chamber elected in July met and became the first legislature of the July Monarchy.; 2. The Revolution of July 1830 prevented the election from taking place, and the Saint-Cloud Ordinances—including the one dissolving the Chamber—were subsequently declared null and void.; 3. Strictly speaking, this was not a parliamentary dissolution in the traditional sense of the term: in the context of the Revolution of 1848, the interim government decided to convene a Constituent Assembly, elected by universal suffrage. It therefore needed to dissolve the previous chamber to do so—but the dissolution was thus made outside the functioning of the regime provided for by the Charter of 1830.; 4. As was the case during the Revolution of 1848, the interim government appointed following the proclamation of the Republic dissolved the entire parliament (upper and lower chambers) outside constitutional rules. Strictly speaking, this was not a parliamentary dissolution.; 5. This election did not follow the dissolution of 1870, but a request from the German Empire, which was occupying the country.; 6. The dissolution was followed by the crisis of May 16, 1877.

== During the Fifth Republic ==
=== Dissolution under the Constitution of 1958 ===
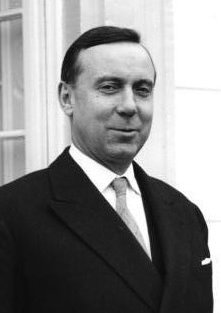
Michel Debré, Keeper of Seals in 1958, one of the main drafters of the 1958 Constitution.

The right of dissolution is provided for in Article 12 of the Constitution:

The President of the Republic may, after consultation with the Prime Minister and the Speakers of the Assemblies, dissolve the National Assembly.

A general election shall be held at least twenty days and at most forty days after the dissolution.

The National Assembly shall convene de jure on the second Thursday following its election. If this meeting takes place outside the period set aside for the ordinary session, a session shall be automatically declared for a period of fifteen days.

A new dissolution shall not be carried out in the year following such election.

—Article 12 of the Constitution of 1958.

This is an extremely simple mechanism—a "quasi-discretionary power" of the President of the Republic—in contrast to that found in the Constitution of 1946. Indeed, the only constitutional requirement was that he first consult the Prime Minister and the two speakers of the parliamentary chambers, whose advice he did not even need to follow. The exercise of the right of dissolution was one of the prerogatives exempt from countersignature by the government under Article 19 of the Constitution.

There were, however, three relatively important limitations:

- The President could not dissolve the National Assembly while exercising the special powers provided for in Article 16 of the Constitution;
- Dissolution was prohibited when the President of the Senate was acting President of the Republic, as per Article 7 of the Constitution; and
- The President could not dissolve the National Assembly again during the year following a dissolution—a translation of the adage "dissolution upon dissolution is null and void", born of the double dissolution attempted by Charles X in 1830. If the President were to be replaced during this year, the said limitation would have also applied to his successor.

Only the National Assembly could be dissolved—not the Senate—since only the National Assembly could overthrow the government. The balance of the regime was parliamentary on paper, with the right to overthrow the government balanced by the right to dissolve the chamber. But unlike most other parliamentary regimes, in France this right of dissolution lay in the hands of the President—not the Prime Minister—leading some writers to characterize the regime as "semi-presidential".

=== Modified dissolution following Fourth Republic's failure ===
==== Proposals to amend dissolution in the Constitution of 1946 ====
As early as the Fourth Republic, a period plagued by government instability, many such as Paul Reynaud and Edgar Faurem (Note: Morabito (2004, p. 405)) supported the removal of all obstacles to dissolution, since it was clear that the complex mechanism created by the Constitution of 1946 did nothing to prevent the fall of one government after another. René Mayer also proposed granting the President of the Council alone the unconditional right to dissolve the National Assembly in order to give the lower house some pause for thought during votes of no confidence.

The regime's final period was marked by thoughtful proposals to improve and even transform the Constitution. Georges Vedel wrote reports advocating the introduction of a presidential regime, arguing that the main cause of the French system's instability was the fragmentation of the political field into a myriad of small parties. Any attempt at constitutional reform could only come up against this stumbling block, which in itself made majorities unstable and governments fragile. (Note: Morabito (2004, p. 405)) (Note: This analysis was pertinent, even if the conclusions drawn were later contradicted. It was the emergence of the "majority rule" in the 1962 legislative elections, in which the Gaullist party alone accounted for 48% of the seats, that explains the great stability of the Fifth Republic – not the institutions alone.)

In 1958, the final year of the Fourth Republic, two Bills with constitutional amendments were put forward—one by Félix Gaillard, on 16 January 1958, and the other by Pierre Pflimlin, on 22 May 1958—both of whom were, at those times, President of the Council. (Note: Morabito (2004, p. 406)) The Gaillard Bill, in particular, proposed two conceptions of dissolution in the new wording of Article 51:

- The President of the Council could have proposed to the Council of Ministers to dissolve the National Assembly at any time, except when the government had been overthrown; and
- If two government crises had occurred in eighteen months, or no government had succeeded in gaining the Chamber's confidence, the President of the Republic could then have decided, of his own accord, to dissolve the National Assembly to resolve the crisis.

On 21 March 1958, the National Assembly passed the Gaillard Bill with substantial amendments, but the Council of the République would not have enough to react before the ensuing crisis of May 1958.

==== Constitutional drafting ====
On 13 May 1958, the Coup d'état in Algiers put an abrupt end to these attempts at constitutional revision, despite their having been adopted by the National Assembly. The Constitutional Act of June 3, 1958 established a special amendment procedure, entrusting Charles de Gaulle's government with the task of drafting the future constitution. In particular, the second and third clauses of the Act's sole article provide that:

The executive and legislative branches shall be effectively separated so that the Government and Parliament may each assume full responsibility for their respective duties; The Government shall be accountable to Parliament.

On this basis, during the drafting phase, the government drew inspiration from the prolific constitutional debate that had been going on since the interwar period. As far as the right of dissolution was concerned, the Bill was hardly original, definitively freeing dissolution of any constraints, thus implementing a reform proposed many times. As early as 13 June 1958, General de Gaulle advised the newly-formed intergovernmental committee that the right of dissolution should belong to the Head of State and that he should be able to use it unconditionally. Among the provisions drafted by the President of the Republic on 23 June 1958, Article 9 contained the identical first clause of the current Article 12. The preliminary draft Constitution, prepared by the government assisted by the two bodies, contains, almost identical to the final version, the following provisions concerning dissolution:

The President of the Republic may, after consultation with the Prime Minister and the Speakers of the Assemblies, dissolve the National Assembly.

A general election shall be held at least twenty days and at most forty days after the dissolution.

The National Assembly shall convene de jure on the third Thursday following its election.

No new dissolution may be carried out in the year following such election.

— Article 10 of the preliminary draft Constitution.

The Constitutional Advisory Committee hardly changed this article. (Note: With the exception of the words "third Thursday", replaced by "second Thursday". The phrase "If this meeting takes place outside the period provided for ordinary sessions, a session is opened as of right for a period of fifteen days" was added to the text proposed to the Interministerial Council on 19 August 1958, but not by the Constitutional Consultative Committee. (Source: Documents pour servir à l'histoire de l'élaboration de la constitution du 4 octobre 1958. Vol. II. Paris: La Documentation française. 1988. p. 626.)) Generally speaking, dissolution, as proposed from the outset, was met with no resistance in the Cabinet meetings of 23 and 25 July 1958 or from the Advisory Committee or the Council of State.

==== Truly parliamentary dissolution ====
Michel Debré, in his speech to the Council of State on 27 August 1958, in which he presented the preliminary draft, reviewed by the Advisory Committee, explicitly stated that: "The government has sought to renovate the parliamentary system. I would even be tempted to say that it wants to establish such a system, which, for many reasons, the Republic has never entirely succeeded in establishing."

Below, the Keeper of Seals emphasized the parliamentary nature of the new institutions, to which he was particularly committed. Later in the speech, he returned to the subject of dissolution:

Is it necessary to emphasize the importance of dissolution? It is the instrument of governmental stability. It can be the reward for a government that appears to have succeeded or the sanction for a government that appears to have failed. (Note: A reference to the "English-style" dissolution practice, where the mechanism is used to provoke elections at the most opportune moment for the majority party.) It enables a brief dialogue between the Head of State and the Nation, which can resolve a conflict or allow the voice of the people to be heard at a decisive moment.

This "parliamentary interpretation" of the Constitution of 1958, which was to be strongly qualified by the facts, was shared by most of those involved in the drafting process, which explains why there was little resistance to the introduction of certain presidential powers such as dissolution, which was, in essence, nothing more than a power of institutional arbitration.

Thus, dissolution was originally seen as one of the tools of the "rationalized parliamentarism" introduced by the Fifth Republic—the necessary conditional to government accountability—and functioned at the discretion of the President of the Republic, as arbiter of the smooth functioning of public institutions.

=== Dissolution during the Fifth Republic ===
Summary of the use of dissolution under the Fifth Republic
Order of Dissolution	President of the Republic	Dissolved Assembly	New Assembly	
Order of Dissolution	President of the Republic	Legislature	Legislature	Election
10 October 1962	Charles de Gaulle	First Legislature	Second legislature	November 18 and 25, 1962
30 May 1968	Charles de Gaulle	Third legislature	Fourth legislature	June 23 and 30, 1968
22 May 1981	François Mitterrand	Fifth Legislature	Seventh Legislature	June 14 and 21, 1981
May 14, 1988	François Mitterrand	Eighth Legislature	Ninth Legislature	June 5 and 12, 1988
April 21, 1997	Jacques Chirac	Tenth Legislature	11th Legislature	May 25 and June 1, 1997
9 June 2024	Emmanuel Macron	16th Legislature	17th Legislature	June 30 and July 7, 2024

=== President de Gaulle's two dissolutions ===
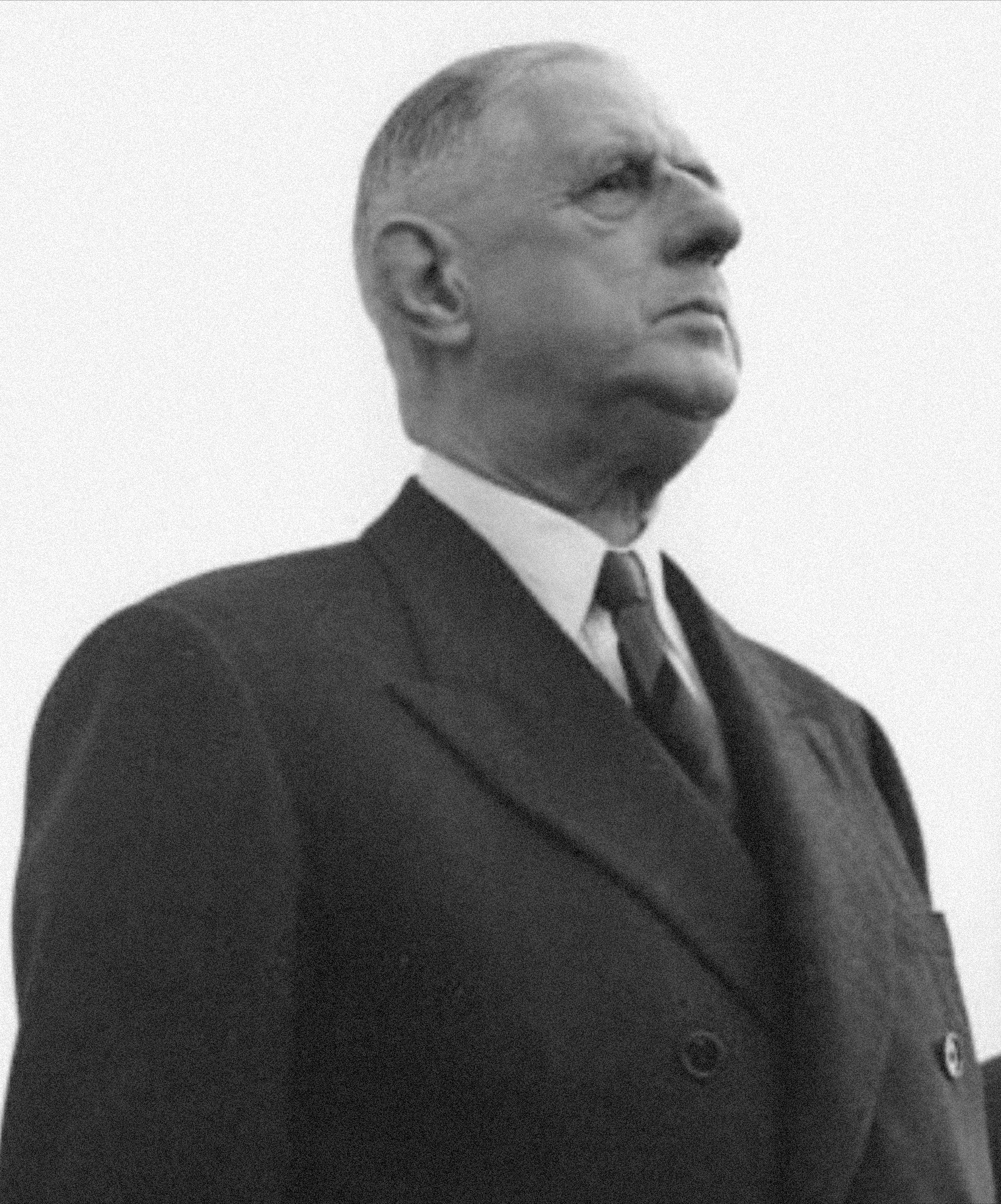
Charles de Gaulle, first President of the Fifth Republic

During his ten-year presidency, Charles de Gaulle used dissolution twice: in 1962 and 1968.

==== Dissolution of 1962, typically parliamentary ====
The very first dissolution of the Fifth Republic perfectly embodied the parliamentary theory of the right of dissolution, which made the people the arbiter of conflict between the executive and legislative branches. On 5 October 1962, the National Assembly, acting pursuant to Article 50 of the Constitution, overthrew the Georges Pompidou government. (Note: The National Assembly, like the Senate at the time, opposed the use of a referendum under Article 11 of the Constitution to carry out the constitutional revision that General de Gaulle wanted – the election of the President by universal suffrage. But, as President de Gaulle was politically irresponsible, the Assembly expressed its opposition by overthrowing the Georges Pompidou government.) But the President of the Republic, Charles de Gaulle, refused to give in and dissolved the Assembly on 9 October 1962, appealing to the judgment of the country.

It was a resounding victory, with the 1962 legislative election giving an absolute majority to Gaullists. The conflict between the lower house and the government was thus resolved in favour of the re-elected government.

==== Dissolution of 1968 ====
The dissolution of 30 May 1968 was not the result of a political crisis – Parliament was supporting the Pompidou government at the time (Note: It had so little to do with the government that -despite a crushing victory for the outgoing parliamentary majority- Maurice Couve de Murvillea was appointed as the new Prime Minister.)—but of a national crisis. From the electorate's perspective, the issue was less one of arbitrating a conflict between the legislative and executive branches, than of deciding whether to reaffirm its confidence in the President of the Republic, Charles de Gaulle. In this sense, it could be considered a "referendum on dissolution".

General de Gaulle himself interpreted this dissolution as a referendum in disguise.

==== Conclusion ====
The two dissolutions ordered by Charles de Gaulle are unusual in that, on each occasion, the president of the republic put a sort of "question of confidence" to the electorate: a refusal to elect the requested majority would have likely led to the President's resignation, as happened following the 1969 referendum, though the president, who also had the initiative in this matter, would not in theory have been affected by the outcome of the election.

In a way, for the president, putting his responsibility at stake on the occasion of a dissolution mitigated the monarchical appearance of the right of dissolution under the Fifth Republic, which operated based on the two 19th-century charters, by bringing the use of this right closer to that of the classic parliamentary system. None of Charles de Gaulle's successors exercised this right again, allowing France to experience its first parliamentary cohabitation in 1986. (Note: As the 1986 elections had produced a hostile majority, the president could have chosen to resign, which would probably have restored the missing political harmony between the parliamentary and presidential majorities.)

==== Absence of dissolution under Pompidou and Giscard ====
Neither Georges Pompidou nor Valéry Giscard d'Estaing ever dissolved the National Assembly. However, on several occasions, President Giscard d'Estaing brandished the threat of dissolution to maintain the control over his fickle double parliamentary majority, created by the 1978 election, which comprised the Rally for the Republic and the Union for French Democracy. The instability of this majority came to a head in 1979, when the Barre government had to resort six times to using Article 49, paragraph 3, to pass the budget.

==== François Mitterrand's dissolutions ====
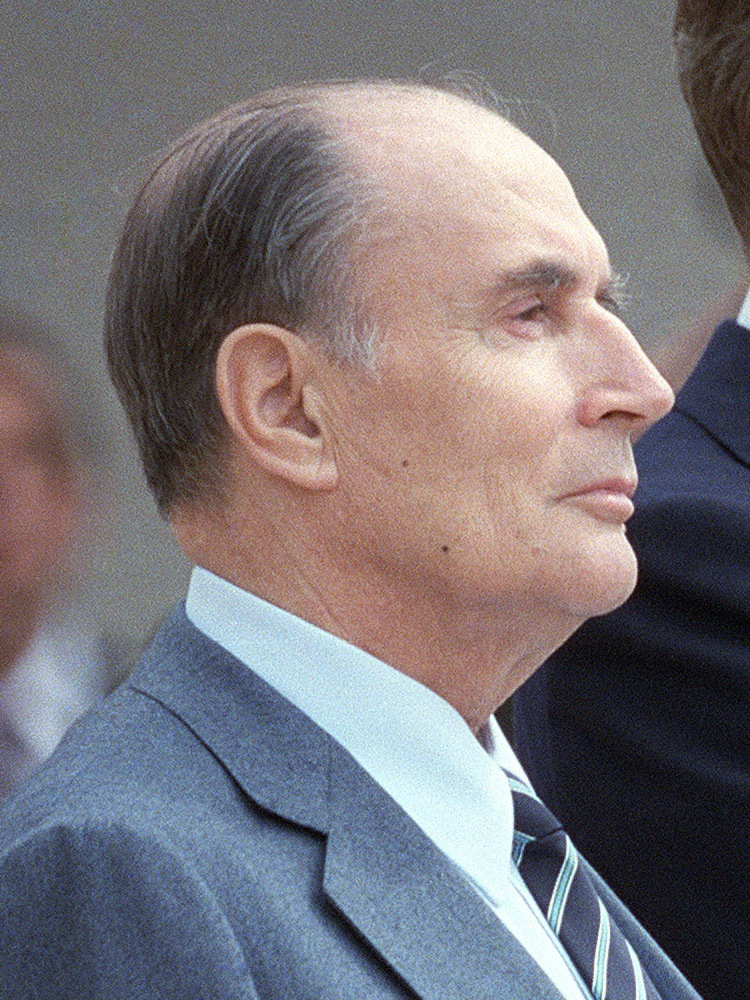
François Mitterrand, first Socialist President of the Fifth Republic.

The two dissolutions carried out by François Mitterrand—in 1981 and 1988—took place in identical contexts, wherein Mitterrand was elected, then re-elected, as President of the Republic, but both times faced a hostile majority in the National Assembly. (Note: The first chamber was formed in the 1978 elections, the second in the 1986 elections.)

The election of the President by universal suffrage was the main cause of these two dissolutions, for the President—elected on his political platform by the electorate as a whole—could not be content with the subservient and powerless role to which the hostile majority would have confined him.

==== 1981 context ====
During the televised debate between himself and Valéry Giscard d'Estaing on 5 May 1981, the future president made his position very clear:

I intend to dissolve [the National Assembly] and hold an election before July 1. Even if there was significant pushback against this, I would still maintain my decision, by which I mean that I would not be able to keep this Assembly. For me, the problem is that, without a majority, we cannot accomplish our policy objectives.

François Mitterrand was elected President of the Republic on 10 May 1981. The dissolution of the National Assembly, along with the appointment of a new Prime Minister, Pierre Mauroy, to form a government, was one of the first decisions taken when he took office on 21 May 1981. Following the elections of 14 and 21 June 1981, Mitterrand confirmed Pierre Mauroy as Prime Minister and formed a new government—including several Communist ministers.

==== 1988 context ====
Each time, the election results favoured President Mitterrand and his left-wing majority. However, the 1988 election brought a majority that proved difficult to manage. This explains the government's extensive use of Article 49, paragraph 3 during this legislature—especially by Michel Rocard's government.

The dissolution of 1988 was therefore not as successful as that of 1981, exhibiting the President's vulnerability to being ousted—a risk that would materialize at the next dissolution, in 1997.

==== Jacques Chirac's dissolution ====
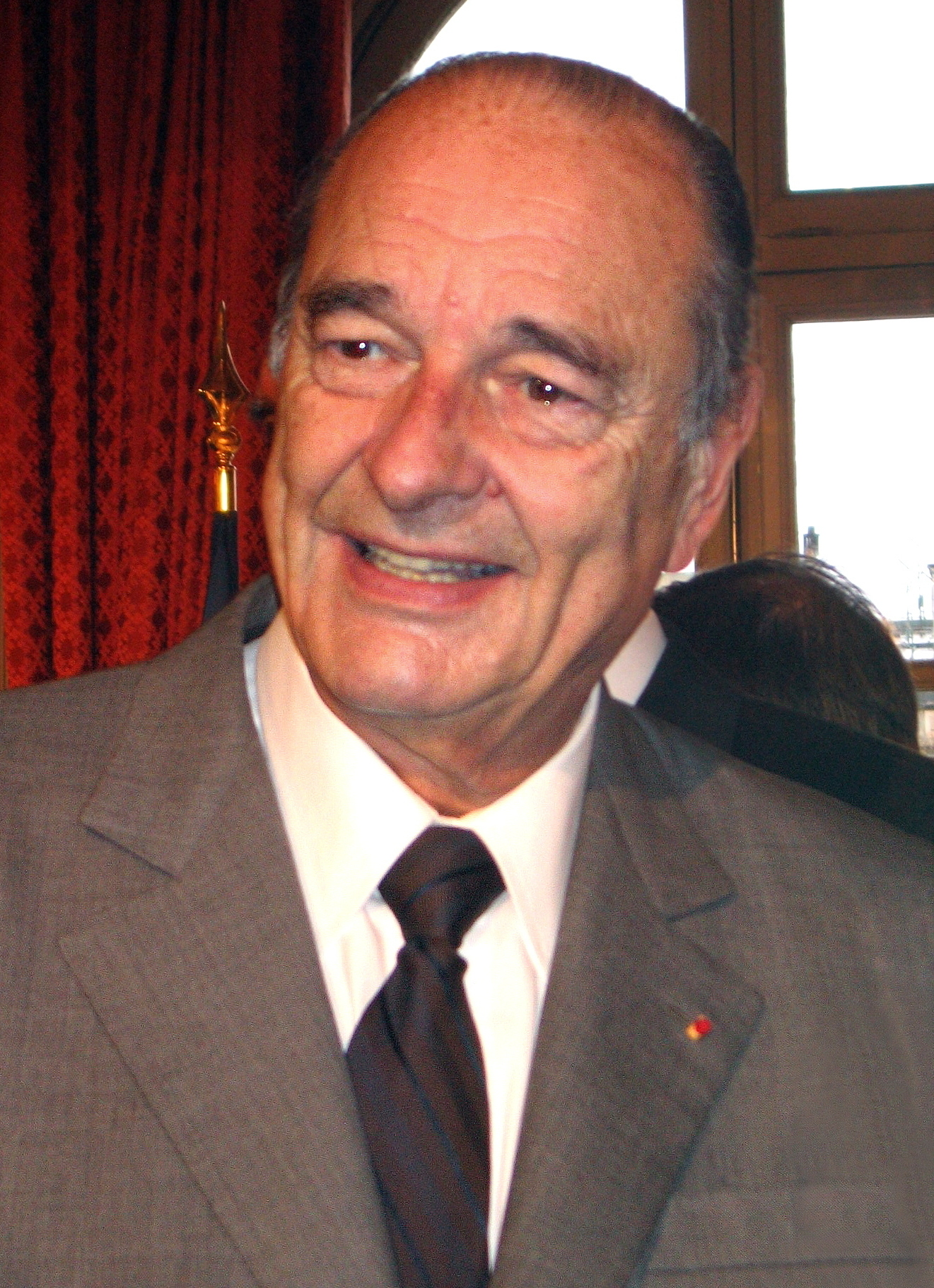
Jacques Chirac, the last President to order a dissolution of the French lower chamber during a seven-year term.

On 21 April 1997, Jacques Chirac, President of the Republic for almost two years, dissolved the National Assembly, elected in 1993. The majority of its members were from the Rally for the Republic, the Union for French Democracy or other miscellaneous right-wing blocs and of the same political persuasion as Jacques Chirac. Indeed, Chirac had headed the Union of the Right and Centre and had himself been re-elected as a deputy for the Rally for the Republic that year).

On 17 May 1995, Jacques Chirac, the newly elected President of the Republic, took office and appointed Alain Juppé as Prime Minister. The number of women in his Cabinet was nearly unprecedented, and personalities such as Jacques Toubon, Alain Madelin and François Bayrou, who had been ministers in the Balladur government, remained in Alain Juppé's. Chirac refused to dissolve the National Assembly, arguing that "no political crisis would have justified such a decision". However, although the chamber elected in 1993 had an overwhelming right-wing majority, this majority was not that of the President-elect, and it supported him poorly. Adjustments and reshuffles took place on 20 May – 26 August 1995. The second Juppé government was formed on 7 November of the same year, which saw eight of the first Juppé government's 12 female ministers ousted, along with government spokesman François Baroin.

Chirac's decision to dissolve the National Assembly was taken on Sunday, 9 February 1997, during a meeting at the Élysée Palace between him and the Secretary General of the Presidency Dominique de Villepin, Prime Minister Alain Juppé and Chief of Staff Maurice Gourdault-Montagne. The four men were aware that the government budget, which estimates public deficits for 1997 at 3.8% of GDP—above the 3% required by the Maastricht Treaty—obliged them to cut public spending, which could prevent the presidential majority from winning the election scheduled for March 1998. A cabinet reshuffle was out of the question, so they opted to bring forward the election early in hope of consolidating their majority and passing unpopular austerity decisions afterward.

On 17 April 1997, faced with forecasts of a deepening deficit and polls showing that majority coalition of the Rally for the Republic and Union for French Democracy held only a slim advantage in seats over the left, Chirac convened his "private council" to take a decision. On the eve of the announcement of the dissolution, Lionel Jospin, leader of the Plural Left, was a guest on the TF1 show 7 out of 7. In his view, an early election would be "an admission of failure" on the part of the President of the Republic.

On the evening of 21 April 1997, in a radio and television address, Jacques Chirac announced the dissolution of the National Assembly and the holding of an election on 25 May and 1 June.

The 1997 election resulted in a left-wing majority in the National Assembly, formed by the Gauche coalition—which included the Socialist Party, the French Communist Party, the Greens, the Citizens' Movement, the Radical Party of the Left and other miscellaneous left-wing politicians. President Jacques Chirac appointed Lionel Jospin as Prime Minister. A period of cohabitation between Chirac and a left-wing government began, lasting four years and 11 months, until May 2002.

The late decision to dissolve the National Assembly in 1997, a year before the normal end of its term, was akin to a "dissolution for personal convenience". For the President, it was a matter of choosing the best moment to obtain his desired majority, similar to the practice in the United Kingdom, before the 2011 (Note: The 2011 reform (Fixed-term Parliaments Act) put an end to this customary rule and imposed a fixed five-year term on the House of Commons, except in two special cases: if the government is toppled by a motion of no confidence from the House of Commons; or if two-thirds of the lower house itself decide that an early general election is necessary.) reform, where the Prime Minister chooses the most appropriate moment to hold the election. However, it is significant that, although the 1997 dissolution may have been described as an "English-style dissolution", it was different in that President Chirac did not link his continued holding of office to the outcome of the election.

==== Almost three decades without a dissolution ====
Presidential and parliamentary elections have occurred simultaneously, following the introduction of the five-year presidential term in 2000, which made a discordance between the President and parliamentary majority unlikely—except in the event of an unforeseeable accident, such as the death or resignation of the President. Future presidents of the Republic will likely enjoy solid and loyal parliamentary majorities, as they are elected directly after them and will have little opportunity to dissolve the National Assembly.

The possibility of a "tactical" dissolution has, however, been rumoured several times by the press, without going beyond the stage of prospective reflection—for example, in 2014, under the presidency of François Hollande, and as early as autumn 2022 concerning Emmanuel Macron.

==== Emmanuel Macron's dissolution ====
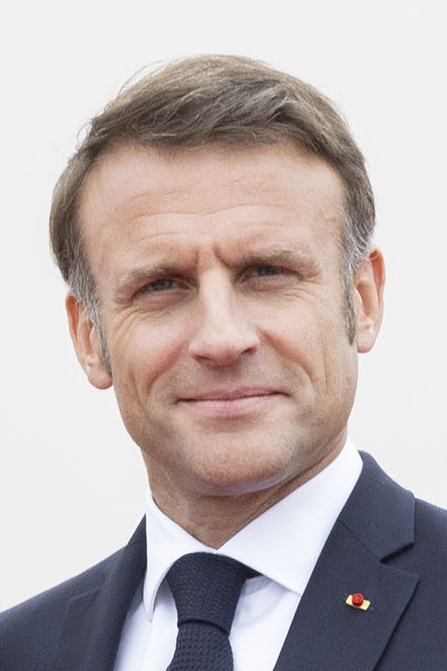
Emmanuel Macron, the first President to order a dissolution during a five-year term.

Even before the start of the 2022 legislature, the possibility of dissolution had been raised by the non-majority coalition as a way to deal with the absence of a total majority, particularly in the event of a motion of no confidence.

On the evening of 9 June 2024, shortly after the results of the European elections were published with the National Rally leading with 31.4% of the vote (more than twice as many as the presidential majority list, which came second with 14.6%), Emmanuel Macron announced that he was dissolving the National Assembly and calling an early election on 30 June – 7 July 2024. The President's decision came as a surprise to commentators, including within the presidential majority.

The dissolution suspends several parliamentary works in progress, including various Bills (on the end of life and public broadcasting) and commissions of inquiry (on sexual violence in the film industry, child protection and the A69 freeway).

The Order of dissolution stipulated that candidacies must be submitted by Sunday, 16 June 2024, one week after the announcement.

The very short period of twenty days between the announcement of the dissolution and the election was a record under the Fifth Republic, being the earliest possible time it could have been held under the limit set by the Constitution. As a result, appeals were made to the Constitutional Council to enjoin the Order.

The dissolution triggered a political hurricane in France, including an electoral tug-of-war between left-wing coalition New Popular Front and the right-wing alliance of the Republicans and National Rally.

The National Rally and its allies won the first round of the election with 33.15% of the vote, although slightly below the polls. The New Popular Front came in second with 28%, up 3 points from their performance in 2022. While France Unbowed remained the main party with 163 candidates, others made strong progress, especially the Socialists with 136. The presidential coalition Together for the Republic suffered a significant decline to 23% of the vote, with the Republicans in fourth place with only 6.5%.

== See also ==
- Parliamentary system
- Dissolution of parliament
- Motion of no confidence

== Bibliography ==
=== Anthologies ===
- Cointet, Jean-Paul (1992). "L'écriture de la constitution de 1958 : le poids de l'histoire". In Maus, Didier; Favoreu, Louis; Parodi, Jean-Luc (eds.). L'écriture de la constitution de 1958 : Actes du colloque du XXXe anniversaire, Aix-en-Provence, 8, 9, 10 septembre 1988. Paris: Economica. ISBN 2717823549.
- Maus, Didier (1992). "L'institution présidentielle dans l'écriture de la constitution de 1958". In Maus, Didier; Favoreu, Louis; Parodi, Jean-Luc (eds.). L'écriture de la constitution de 1958 : Actes du colloque du XXXe anniversaire, Aix-en-Provence, 8, 9, 10 septembre 1988. Paris: Economica. pp. 267–268. ISBN 2717823549.

=== Singular works ===
- Ardant, Philippe (2003). Institutions politiques & Droit constitutionnel (15th ed.). Paris: LGDJ. ISBN 2275023720.
- Chevallier, Jean-Jacques (2001). Histoire des institutions et des régimes politiques de la France de 1789 à 1958 (9th ed.). Paris: Armand Collin. ISBN 2247045286.
- Morabito, Marcel (2004). Histoire constitutionnelle de la France (1789–1958). Paris: éd. Montchrestien.

=== Articles ===
- "Le projet de révision de Félix Gaillard : Exposé des motifs et projet de loi". Pouvoirs. 1996.
- "Discours de Michel Debré devant le Conseil d'État (27 août 1958)". Constitution française du 4 octobre 1958. 1 (4). Paris: 25–31. 2008. ISBN 9782110074676.
- Goguel, François (1956). "Vers une nouvelle orientation de la révision constitutionnelle". Revue française de science politique. 6 (3): 493–507. doi:10.3406/rfsp.1956.402705.
- Goguel, François (1959). "L'élaboration des institutions de la République dans la constitution du 4 octobre 1958". Revue française de science politique. 9 (1): 67–86. doi:10.3406/rfsp.1959.402984.
- Zarka, Jean-Claude (1997). Les dissolutions sous la Ve République. Paris: La Documentation française.

=== Further reading ===
- Comité nationale chargé de la publication des travaux préparatoires des institutions de la Ve République. Documents pour servir à l'histoire de l'élaboration de la constitution du 4 octobre 1958. Paris: La Documentation française. 1987–1988:
  - Des origines de la loi constitutionnelle du 3 juin 1958 à l'avant-projet du 29 juillet 1958. Vol. I.
  - Le Comité consultatif constitutionnel, De l'avant-projet du 29 juillet 1958 au projet du 21 août 1958. Vol. II.
  - Du Conseil d'État au référendum, 20 août-28 septembre 1958. Vol. III.
- Albertini, Pierre (1978). "Le droit de dissolution et les systèmes constitutionnels français". Publications de l'Université de Rouen (43). Paris – via Presses universitaires de France.
