= Chamber of Deputies (France) =

Former parliamentary body in France

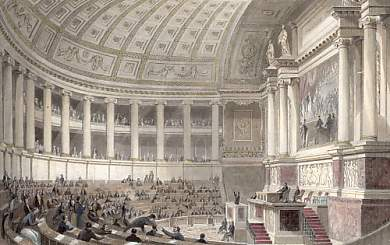
The Chamber of Deputies of France at the Palais Bourbon in 1841.

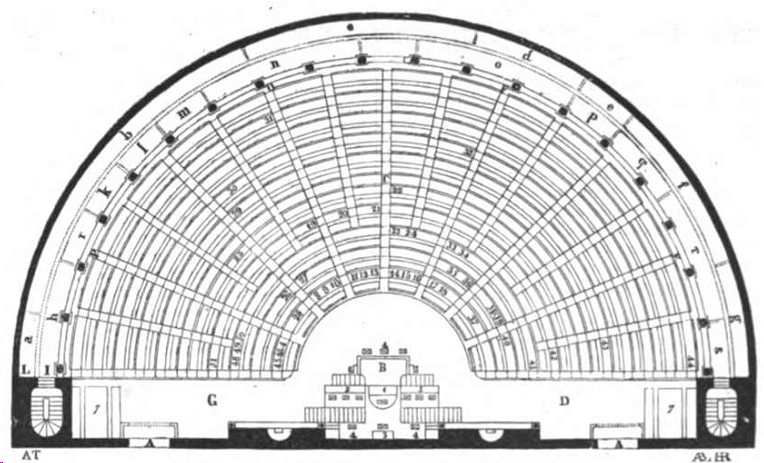
Floor plan of the conference hall of the Chamber of Deputies

The Chamber of Deputies (French: Chambre des députés, [ʃɑ̃bʁ de depyte]) was the lower house of parliament in France at various times in the 19th and 20th centuries:

- 1814–1848 during the Bourbon Restoration and the July Monarchy, the Chamber of Deputies was the lower house of the French Parliament, elected by census suffrage.
- 1875–1940 during the French Third Republic, the Chamber of Deputies was the legislative assembly of the French Parliament, elected by two-round system with universal male suffrage. When reunited with the Senate in Versailles, the French Parliament was called the National Assembly (Assemblée nationale) and carried out the election of the president of the French Republic.

== During the Bourbon Restoration ==
Created by the Charter of 1814 and replacing the Corps législatif, which existed under the First French Empire, the Chamber of Deputies was composed of individuals elected by census suffrage. Its role was to discuss laws and, most importantly, to vote taxes. According to the Charter, deputies were elected for five years, with one-fifth renewed each year. Deputies needed to be 40 years old and to pay 1,000 francs in direct contributions.

Government ministers could be chosen from among the deputies, and this resulted in giving the Restoration government a slight, albeit minor, parliamentary and liberal character.

During the Hundred Days (les cent jours) return of Napoleon I in 1815, under the terms of the Additional Act to the Constitutions of the Empire, the Chamber of Deputies was briefly replaced by a Chamber of Representatives (Chambre des représentants). This body was dissolved upon the entry of Coalition troops into Paris on 7 July.

For the period 1815–1816, the (then) Ultra-royalist chamber was referred to as the Chambre introuvable.

== During the July Monarchy ==
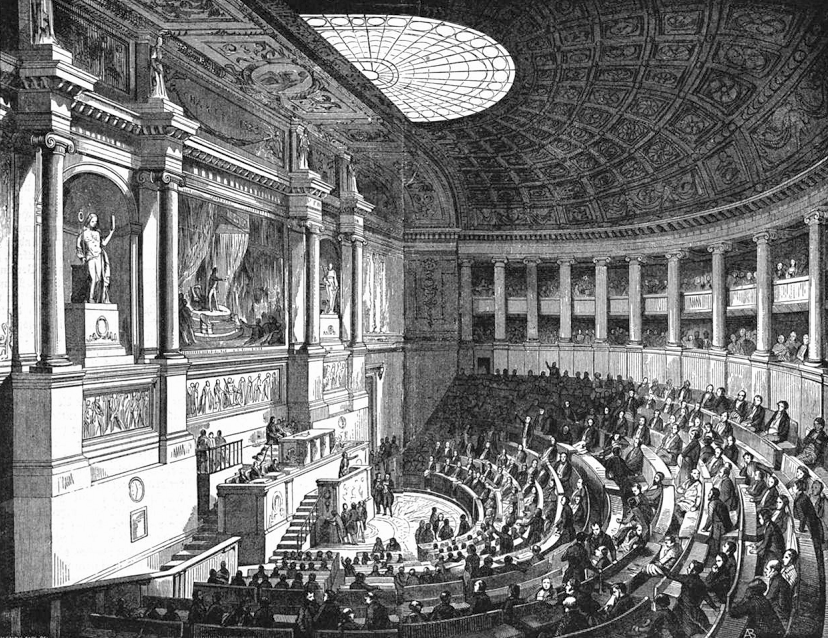
Conference hall of the Chamber of Deputies 1843

The Chamber of Deputies was elected by census suffrage according to the Charter of 1830. The political life of the July Monarchy was defined by the split within the Chamber of Deputies between the progressive movement (considered the Charter as a starting point) and the conservative wing (who refused any further modifications). Although both parties traded power in the initial stages, by 1840 the conservative members around François Guizot had seized control.

From 1830, deputies were elected for five years. They needed to be 30 years old and to pay 500 francs in direct contributions.

The king convoked the chamber every year, and he had the power to extend the parliamentary session or to dissolve the chamber, although in the latter case he was required to convoke a new chamber in three months time.

In 1852, the Chamber of Deputies retook the name Corps législatif.

== Historical composition ==
=== Kingdom of France (1815–1848) ===
Jacobin Republicans / Miscellaneous left / Republicans / Liberals / Movement Party / Third Party / Doctrinaires / Resistance Party / Orléanist / Bonapartists / Ultra Royalists / Legitimists
May 1815	40 / 510 / 80
August 1815	50 / 350
1816	20 / 10 / 136 / 92
1820	80 / 194 / 160
1824	17 / 413
1827	170 / 260
1830	274 / 282
1831	73 / 282 / 104
1834	75 / 50 / 320 / 15
1837	19 / 142 / 56 / 64 / 168 / 15
1839	240 / 199 / 20
1842	193 / 266
1846	168 / 290

=== French Third Republic (1870–1940) ===
PUP / PCF / SFIO / Far-Left / Radicals and Socialists / Radical Socialists / Republican Union / SI / PRS / Radical Left / Independent Radicals / Radical-Socialists / Centre-Left / Republican Left / Democratic Union / ARD / Miscellaneous / SE / PDP / Progressive Republicans / Constitutional monarchists / Centre-Right / Bonapartists / Orléanist / FR / Clericals / Legitimists / Monarchists / Right / Nationalists / Far-Right
1871	38 / 112 / 72 / 20 / 214 / 182
1876	27 / 98 / 193 / 48 / 15 / 22 / 76 / 40 / 15 / 24
1877	27 / 73 / 147 / 66 / 3 / 111 / 38 / 56
1881	48 / 1 / 47 / 170 / 157 / 44 / 8 / 44 / 38
1885	60 / 40 / 200 / 83 / 65 / 63 / 73
1889	57 / 13 / 69 / 214 / 14 / 3 / 169 / 37
1893	67 / 41 / 99 / 242 / 30 / 27 / 61 / 14
1898	97 / 55 / 86 / 232 / 5 / 53 / 39 / 14
1902	43 / 104 / 129 / 62 / 127 / 89 / 35
1906	54 / 20 / 132 / 115 / 90 / 66 / 78 / 30
1910	75 / 24 / 261 / 1 / 66 / 30 / 131 / 7
1914	5 / 102 / 22 / 192 / 66 / 77 / 50 / 88
1919	68 / 26 / 86 / 107 / 21 / 29 / 183
1924	26 / 104 / 44 / 139 / 123 / 29 / 116
1928	11 / 102 / 60 / 125 / 180 / 24 / 100
1932	9 / 10 / 132 / 43 / 160 / 121 / 49 / 83
1936	6 / 72 / 149 / 44 / 115 / 82 / 42 / 100

== See also ==
- Cabinet of France
- Constitution of France
- French Parliament
- History of France
- National Assembly (French Fourth Republic)
- National Assembly (France) (Fifth Republic)
- Politics of France
