= André Marie Jean Jacques Dupin =

French politician, magistrate and lawyer (1783–1865)

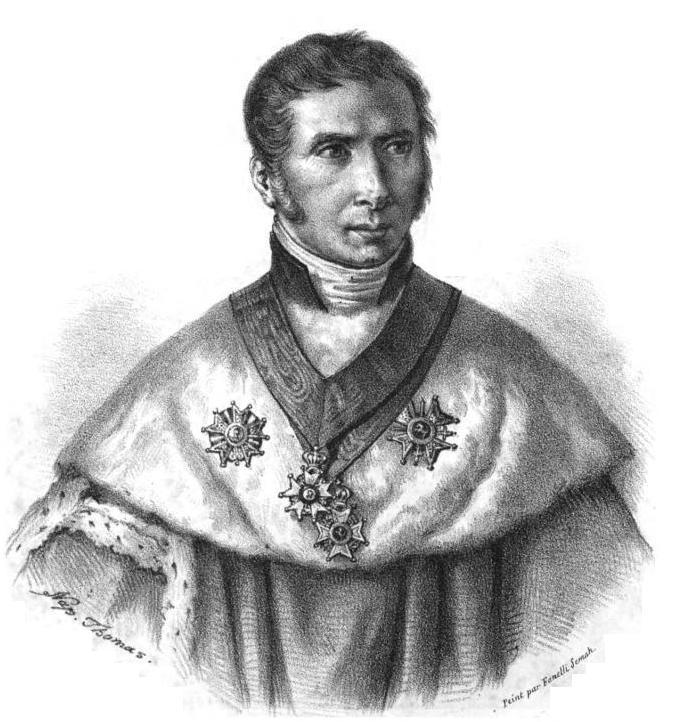

President of the Chamber of Deputies
- In office 29 April 1832 – 2 February 1839
- Preceded by: Amédée Girod de l'Ain
- Succeeded by: Hippolyte Passy

Personal details
- Born: 1 February 1783; Varzy, France
- Died: 8 November 1865 (aged 82); Paris, France

André Marie Jean Jacques Dupin (1 February 1783 – 8 November 1865), commonly called Dupin the Elder, was a French advocate, president of the chamber of deputies and of the Legislative Assembly.

Dupin was born at Varzy, in the Nièvre département, in France. He was educated by his father, who was a lawyer of eminence, and at an early age he became principal clerk of an attorney at Paris. On the establishment of the Académie de Legislation he entered it as pupil from Nièvre. In 1800 he was made advocate, and in 1802, when the schools of law were opened, he received successively the degrees of licentiate and doctor from the new faculty. He was in 1810 an unsuccessful candidate for the chair of law at Paris, and in 1811 he also failed to obtain the office of advocate-general at the Court of Cassation. About this time he was added to the commission charged with the classification of the laws of the empire, and, after the interruption caused by the events of 1814 and 1815, was charged with the sole care of that great work. In May 1815 he entered the Chamber of Representatives and at once took an active part in the debates as a member of the Liberal Opposition, and strenuously opposed the election of the son of Napoleon as emperor after his father's abdication.

At the election after the second restoration Dupin was not reelected. He defended with great intrepidity the principal political victims of the reaction, among others, in conjunction with Pierre-Nicolas Berryer, Marshal Ney; and in October 1815 boldly published a tractate entitled Libre Defense des accusés. In 1827, he was elected a member of the Chamber of Deputies and in 1830 he voted the address of the 221, and on 28 February he was in the streets exhorting the citizens to resistance. At the end of 1832, he became president of the chamber, which office he held successively for eight years. After the 1848 abdication of Louis Philippe, Dupin introduced the young Count of Paris into the chamber, and proposed him as king with his mother as regent.

This attempt failed, but Dupin submitted to circumstances, and, retaining the office of procureur général, his first act was to decide that justice should henceforth be rendered to the "name of the French people." In 1849, he was elected a member of the Assembly, and became president of the principal committee—that on legislation. After the 1851 coup d'état, he still retained his office of procureur général, and did not resign it until effect was given to the decrees confiscating the property of the house of Orléans. In 1857, he was offered his old office by emperor Napoleon III, and accepted it, explaining his acceptance in a discourse, a sentence of which may be employed to describe his whole political career. "I have always", he said, "belonged to France and never to parties."

Among Dupin's works, which are numerous, may be mentioned Principia Juris Civilis, 5 vols. (1806); Mémoires et plaidoyers de 1800 au 1ier janvier 1830, in 20 vols.; and Mémoires ou souvenirs du barreau, in 4 vols. (1855–1857).

His brother, Pierre Charles François Dupin, was a mathematician.
