= 1827 French legislative election =

- 17 November 1827 (first round); 24 November 1827 (second round)

All 430 seats in the Chamber of Deputies 216 seats needed for a majority
| | First party | Second party | Third party |
|---|---|---|---|
| Party | Left-wing opposition | Ministerials | Right-wing opposition |
| Seats won | 199 | 195 | 31 |
Prime Minister before election
Joseph de Villèle
Elected Prime Minister
The Viscount of Martignac

Legislative elections were held in France on 17 and 24 November 1827. The Ultra-royalists loyal to Charles X of France lost the elections.

== Electoral system ==
Suffrage had been restricted to taxpayers since the Restoration. In addition, the monarchist Plessis government had passed a law in 1820 which gave a second vote to the richest 25% of the electorate, known to historians as the "loi du double vote". Finally, there was a 300 franc fee to stand for election. The monarchists believed this system would ensure them a strong majority.

== Results ==
| Party | Seats |
|---|---|
| Left-wing opposition | 199 |
| Supporters of de Villèle ("Ministerials") | 195 |
| Right-wing opposition | 31 |
| Independents | 5 |
| Total | 430 |
Source: Kent

With suffrage confined to a small, wealthy electorate, Joseph de Villèle had expected the election to eke out a majority for his Ministerials before unpopular reforms. Instead, he was surprised by a left-wing coalition of liberals and republicans. Charles dismissed Villèle and appointed Jean Baptiste Gay, 1st Viscount of Martignac, who struggled to maintain a compromise government with the liberal wing while enduring radicalism from both sides. Some of the conservatives chosen by the wealthy electors were supporters of François-René de Chateaubriand or François-Régis de La Bourdonnaye and refused to cooperate in the formation of a coalition.

== Aftermath ==
As Martignac's governance remained unstable into 1829, Charles attempted to construct a new ministry using ultraroyalist Jules de Polignac as foreign affairs minister and La Bourdonnaye, an extreme ultraroyalist who had refused cooperation with Martignac, as domestic affairs minister. This new list, announced in August, had no president as La Bourdonnaye had blocked this as well as other appointments. In November 1829, Polignac gained sole control over the ministry as president. The liberal plurality informed the king they had no confidence in Polignac with the Address of the 221.

Finding no sympathy for his views in the elected Assembly, Charles dissolved it and called fresh elections.
