= 1837 French legislative election =

- 4 November 1837

All 459 seats in the National Assembly 230 seats needed for a majority
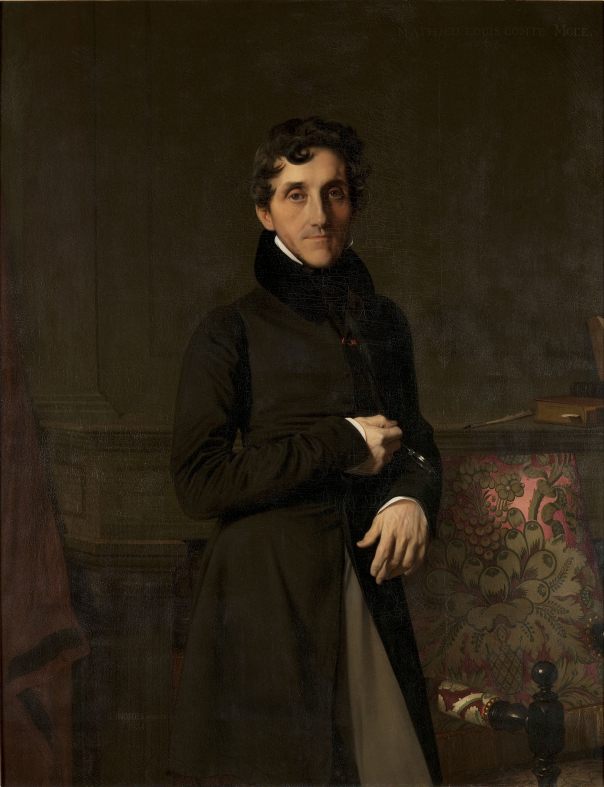

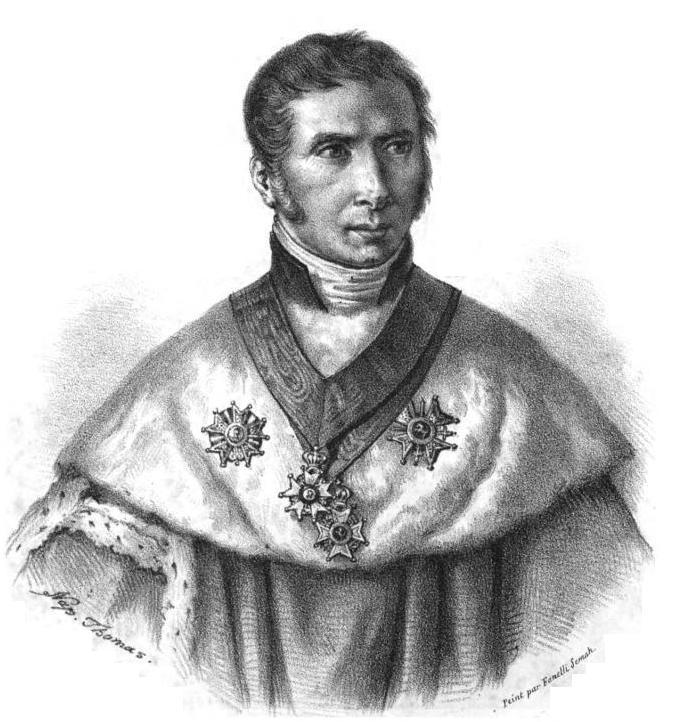

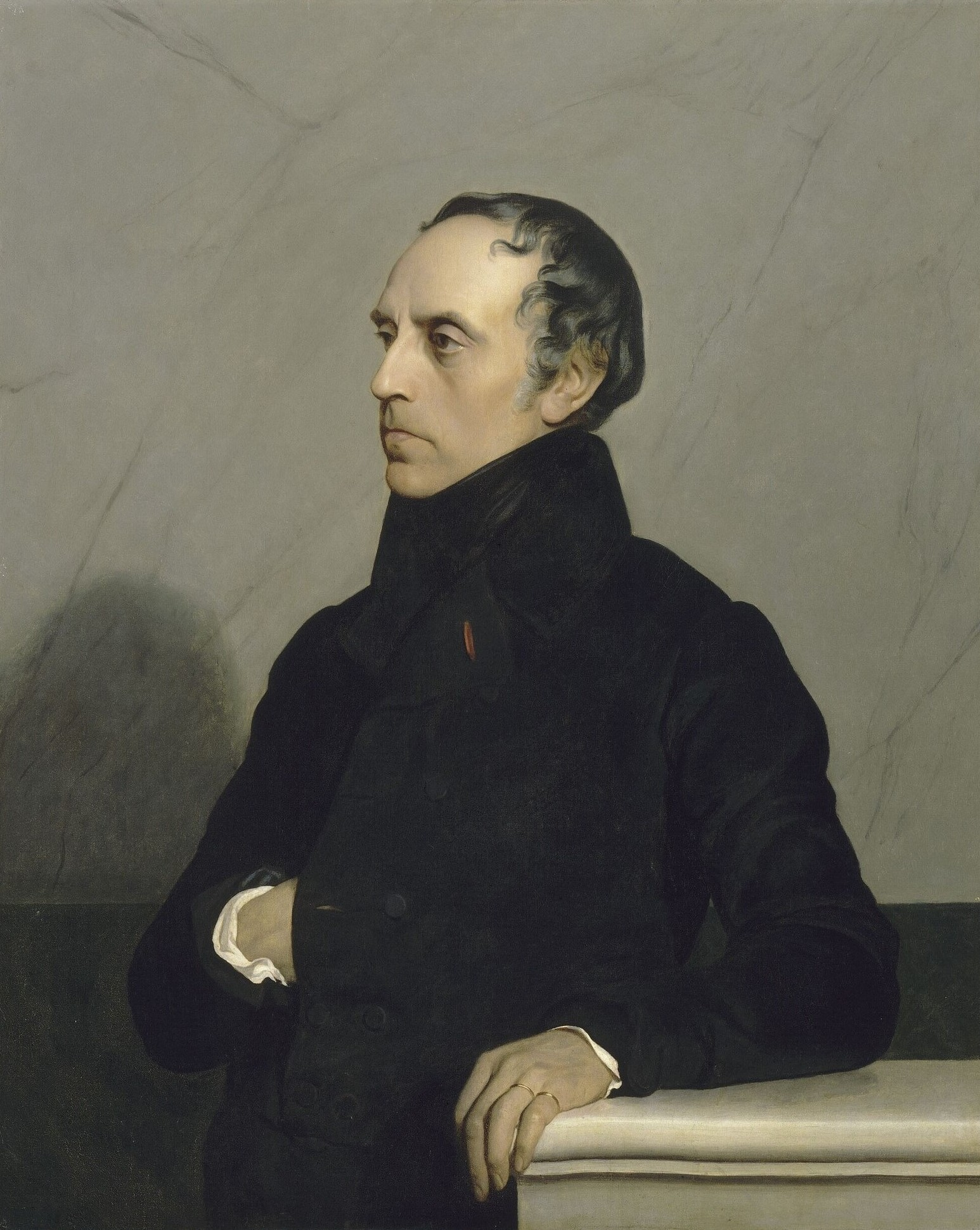

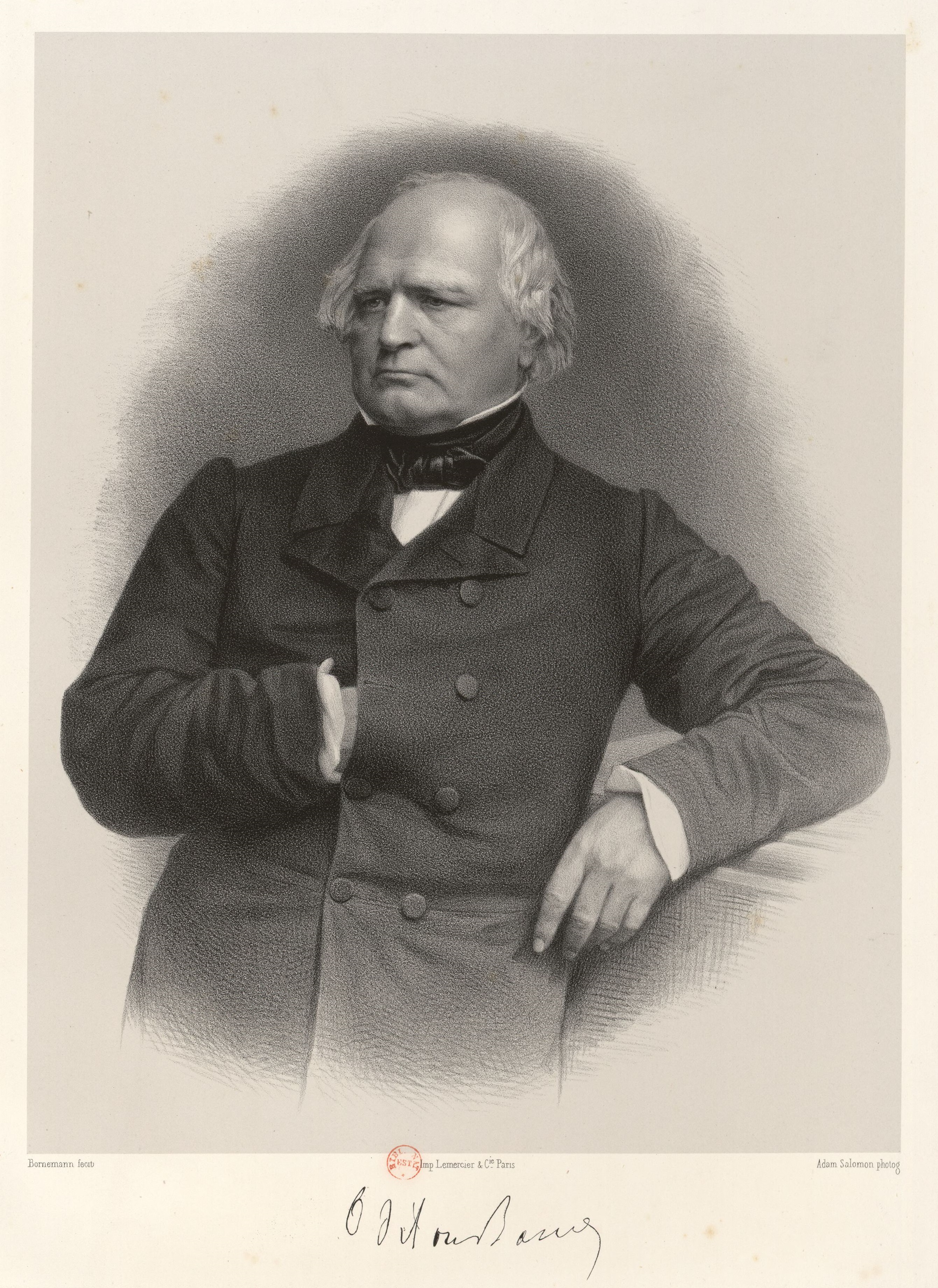

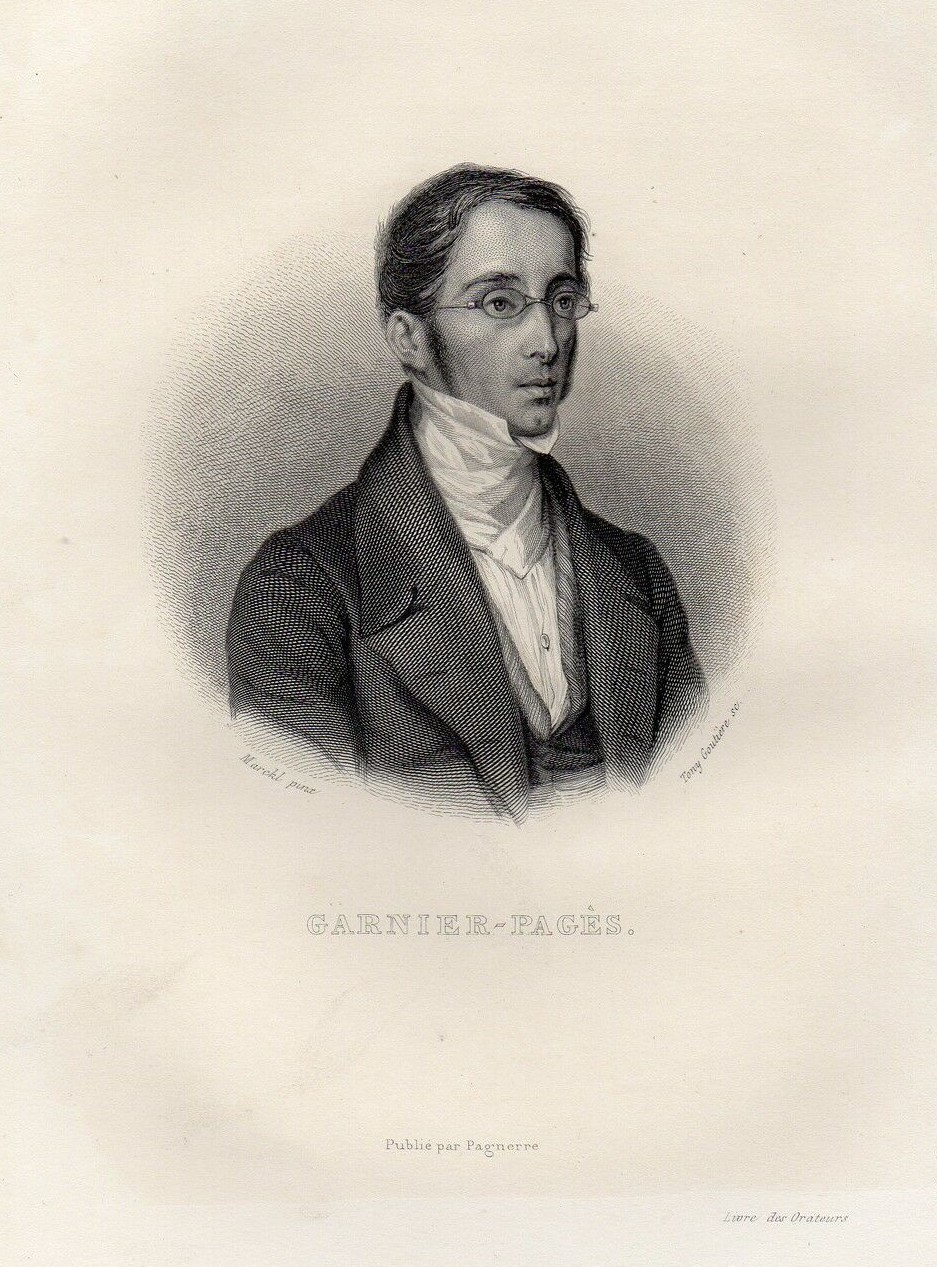

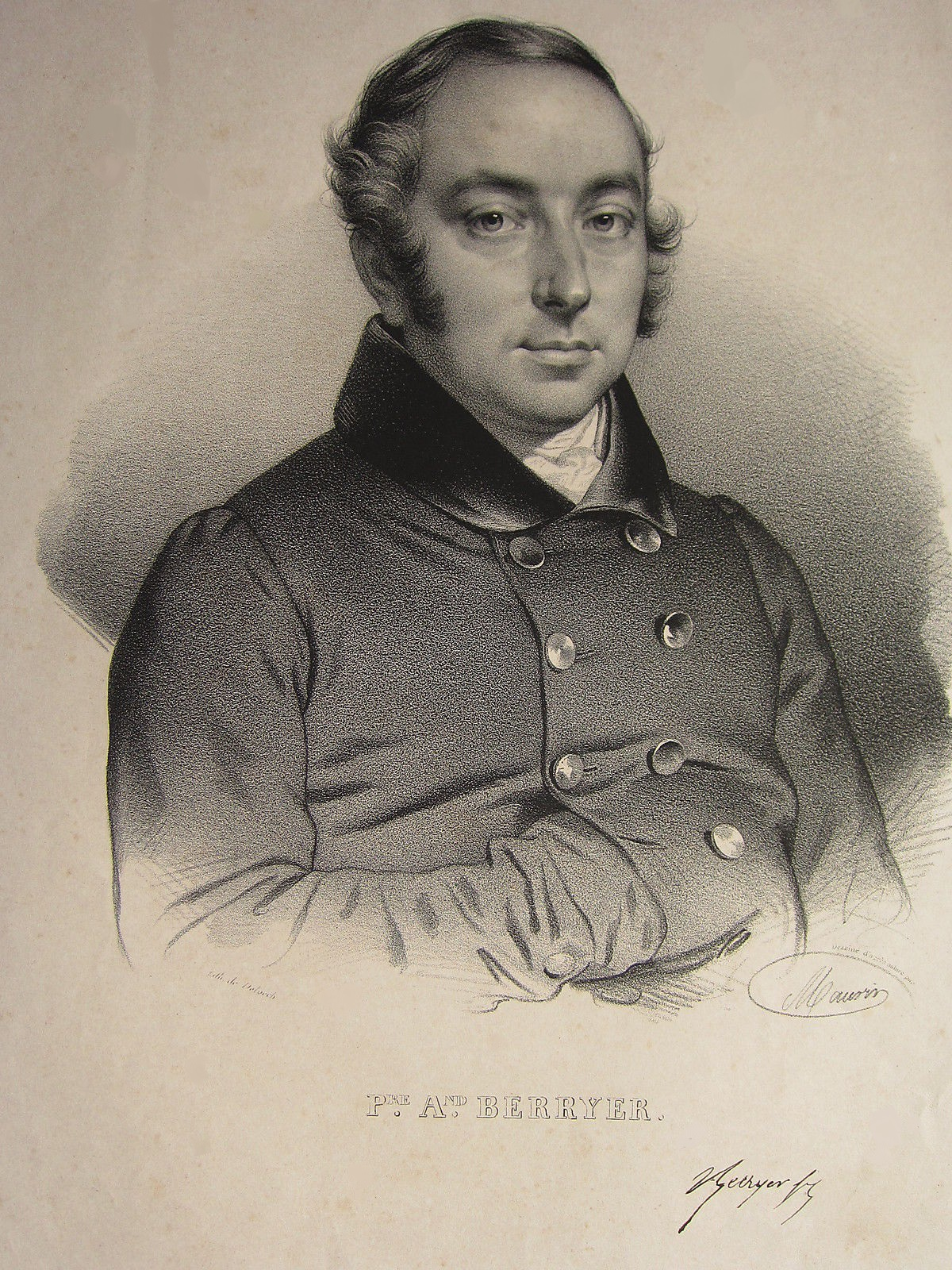
Leader	Louis-Mathieu Molé	André Dupin	François Guizot
Alliance	Pro-Molé Ministry	Center left	Center right
Seats won	163	142	64
Leader	Odilon Barrot	Étienne Garnier-Pagès	Pierre-Antoine Berryer
Alliance	Third Party	Republicans	Legitimists
Seats won	56	19	15
Prime Minister before election
Louis-Mathieu Molé
Elected Prime Minister
Louis-Mathieu Molé

Legislative elections were held in France on 4 November 1837.

Only citizens paying taxes were eligible to vote. 151,720 of the 198,836 registered voters voted.

== Results ==
Party	Votes	%	Seats
Pro-Molé Ministry			163
Center left			142
Center right			64
Third Party			56
Republicans			19
Legitimists			15
Total			459
Total votes	151,720	–	
Registered voters/turnout	198,836	76.30	

== Aftermath ==
Louis-Philippe of France dissolved the legislature in the absence of a majority on 2 February 1839.
