= August 1815 French legislative election =

- 18 and 28 August 1815

All 400 seats in the Chamber of Deputies 201 seats needed for a majority
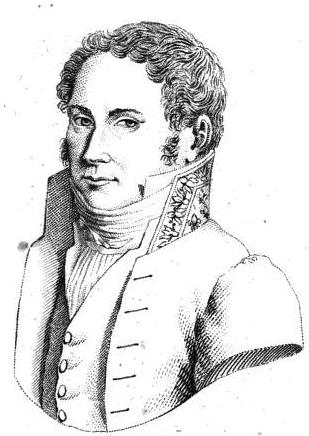

	First party	Second party
Leader	François-Régis de La Bourdonnaye
Party	Ultra-royalist	Opposition
Seats won	350	50
Prime Minister before election
Joseph Fouché
Elected Prime Minister
Charles Maurice de Talleyrand

Legislative elections were held in France on 18 and 28 August 1815 to elect members of the first Chamber of Deputies of the Bourbon Restoration.

== Electoral system ==
Electoral colleges elected a number of candidates equal to the number of deputies. Electoral colleges of the departments chose half of the deputies from these candidates and the other half were chosen freely. These electoral colleges were organised under strict property requirements, with the former half being selected by men above the age of forty paying a direct tax of over 1,000 francs, or those fifty most taxed, depending on the number of eligible voters under the first criterion, and the latter half selected by men above the age of thirty paying a direct tax of over 300 francs. There were up to six hundred eligible voters in each departmental college, with a ratio such that there could only be one elector per thousand inhabitants.

== Results ==
The Ultra-royalists won 350 seats.

Party	Votes	%	Seats
Ultra-royalist			350
Opposition			50
Total			400
Total votes	40,000	–	
Source: Election-Politique, Roi et President

== Aftermath ==
The sweeping victory of the ultra-royalists led to the formation of the chambre introuvable, which prided itself on being more royalist than the king, or plus royaliste que le roi, led on by a fierce counter-revolutionary spirit with a new generation of polemicists and hardliners, such as François-René de Chateaubriand. Due to the reactionary radicalism of this new chamber, Louis XVIII dissolved it in September 1816 in order to reduce tensions, calling the 1816 French legislative election under more equal terms of suffrage.
