= 1830 French legislative election =

- 5 and 13 July 1830 (first round); 19 July 1830 (second round)
- All 417 seats in the Chamber of Deputies; 209 seats needed for a majority
Party	Seats
Liberal opposition	274
Supporters of the Polignac government	143
This lists parties that won seats. See the complete results below.

Legislative elections were held in France on 5 and 13 July 1830, with a second round on 19 July.

== Electoral system ==
The Chamber of Deputies, the lower house of the French Parliament, was constituted by the Charter of 1814. Deputies were elected for five years, with one-fifth being re-elected each year.

The electoral system, which was used for the last time, was the Loi du double vote ("double voting") as defined in June 1820, combining single-member districts for three-fifths of the deputies, elected by 94,000 registered voters, with at-large voting in each of the departments of France for the remaining seats. This meant that many men could vote twice.

== Results ==
Party	Seats
Liberal opposition	274
Supporters of the Polignac government	143
Total	417
Source: Alexander

== Aftermath ==
On 25 July, by the July Ordinances published the next day, King Charles attempted to dissolve the Chamber of Deputies. However, this led to the July Revolution, and as a result of the king's abdication on 2 August, the Chamber was able to proclaim his cousin Louis-Philippe of Orleans as king and continued its term.

The mixed "double voting" system was abolished by the Charter of 1830, adopted on 14 August 1830, which greatly broadened the electorate and established single-member districts only.

119 seats were made subject to by-elections in October 1830, leading to the defeat of many Ultra-royalists.
