= 1831 French legislative election =

- 5 July 1831
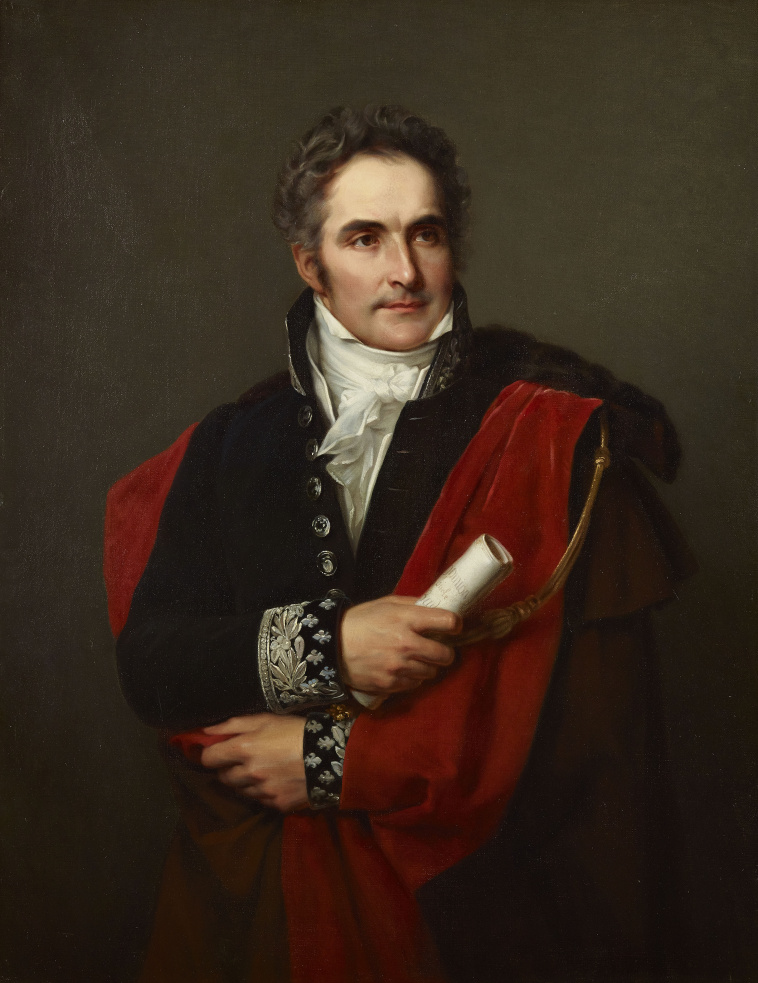

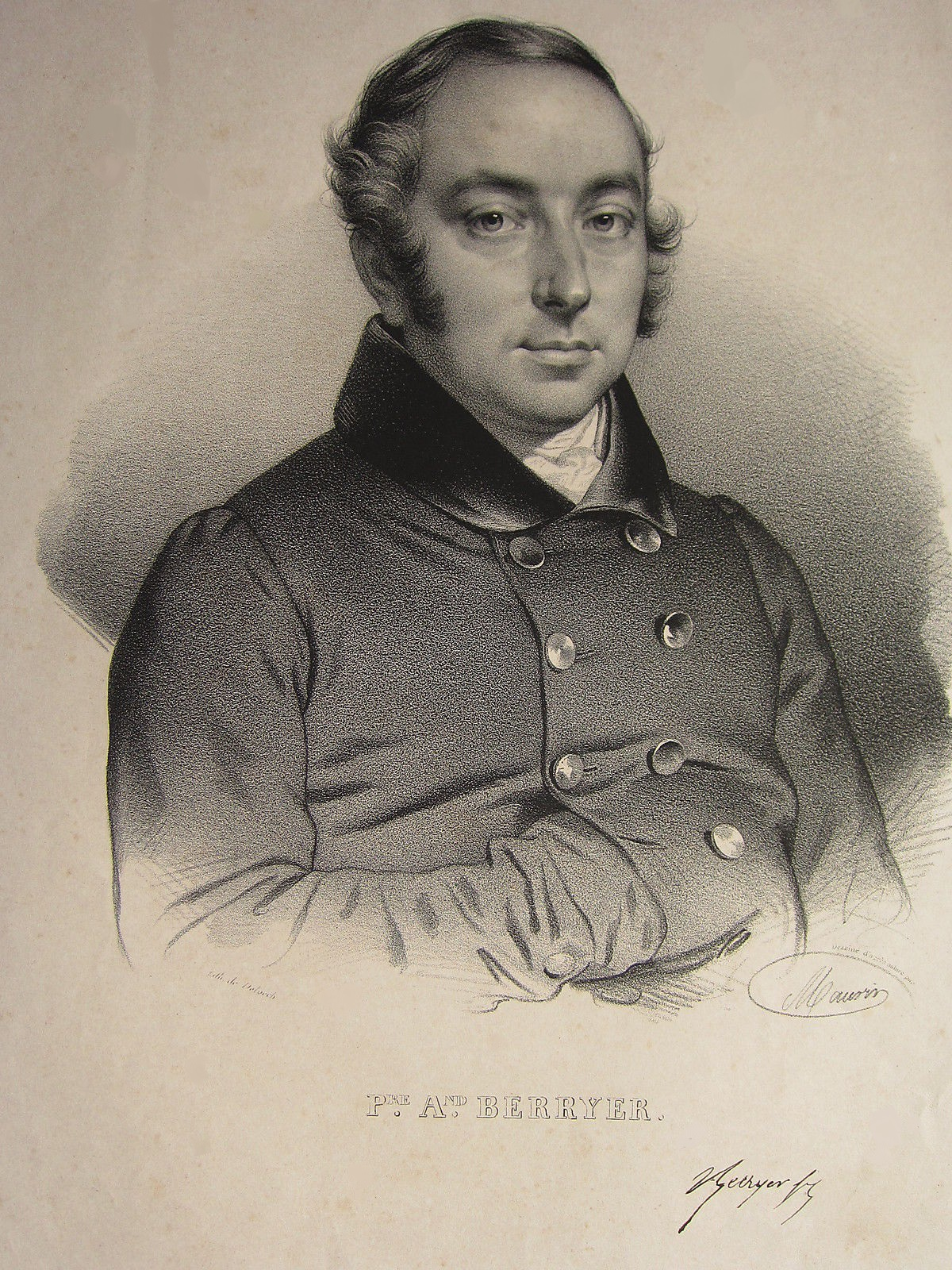

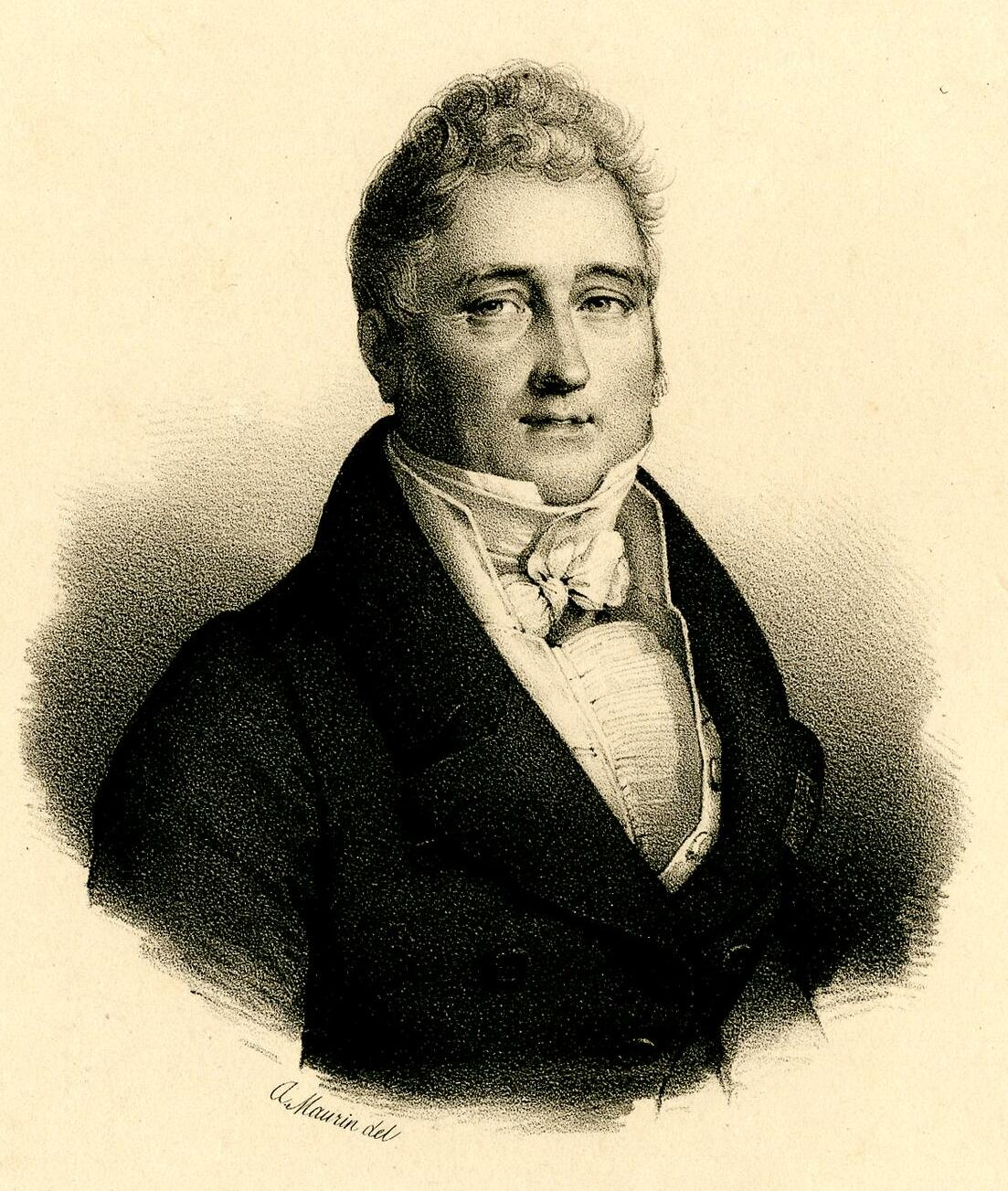
	First party	Second party	Third party
Leader	Casimir Périer	Pierre-Antoine Berryer	Jacques Laffitte
Party	Liberals	Legitimists	Republicans and leftists
Seats won	282	104	73
Prime Minister before election
Casimir Périer
Elected Prime Minister
Casimir Périer

Legislative elections were held in France on 5 July 1831.

== Electoral system ==
Following the July Revolution which brought King Louis-Philippe to power, new election laws were passed on 19 April 1831. Members were elected by first-past-the-post voting in 459 single-member constituencies.

Although suffrage remained limited, the electorate was nearly doubled. Voters now needed to be at least twenty-five years old and to pay 200 francs in income taxes, down from 300 francs before the revolution. Professionals and public servants could vote if they paid at least 100 francs in taxes. The "double voting" system that allowed the wealthiest voters to vote twice was abolished. Candidates had to be at least thirty years old and pay at least 500 francs in taxes.

== Results ==
Party	Votes	%	Seats
Liberals			282
Legitimists			104
Republicans and dynastic left			73
Total			459
Total votes	125,090	–	
Registered voters/turnout	166,583	75.09	
Source: Frémy

Note that these groupings are not formal party affiliations. Instead, they reflect groupings made by later historians based on the political opinions of the deputies. Historians do not always agree on how to draw these lines: Thomas Beck gives a similar number for the pro-government representatives (273), but assigns far more of the opposition to the left (170), leaving only seven legitimists.
