= 1839 French legislative election =

- 2 and 6 March 1839
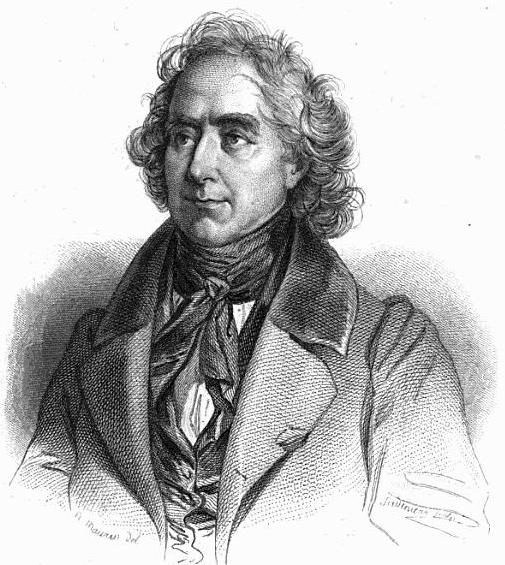

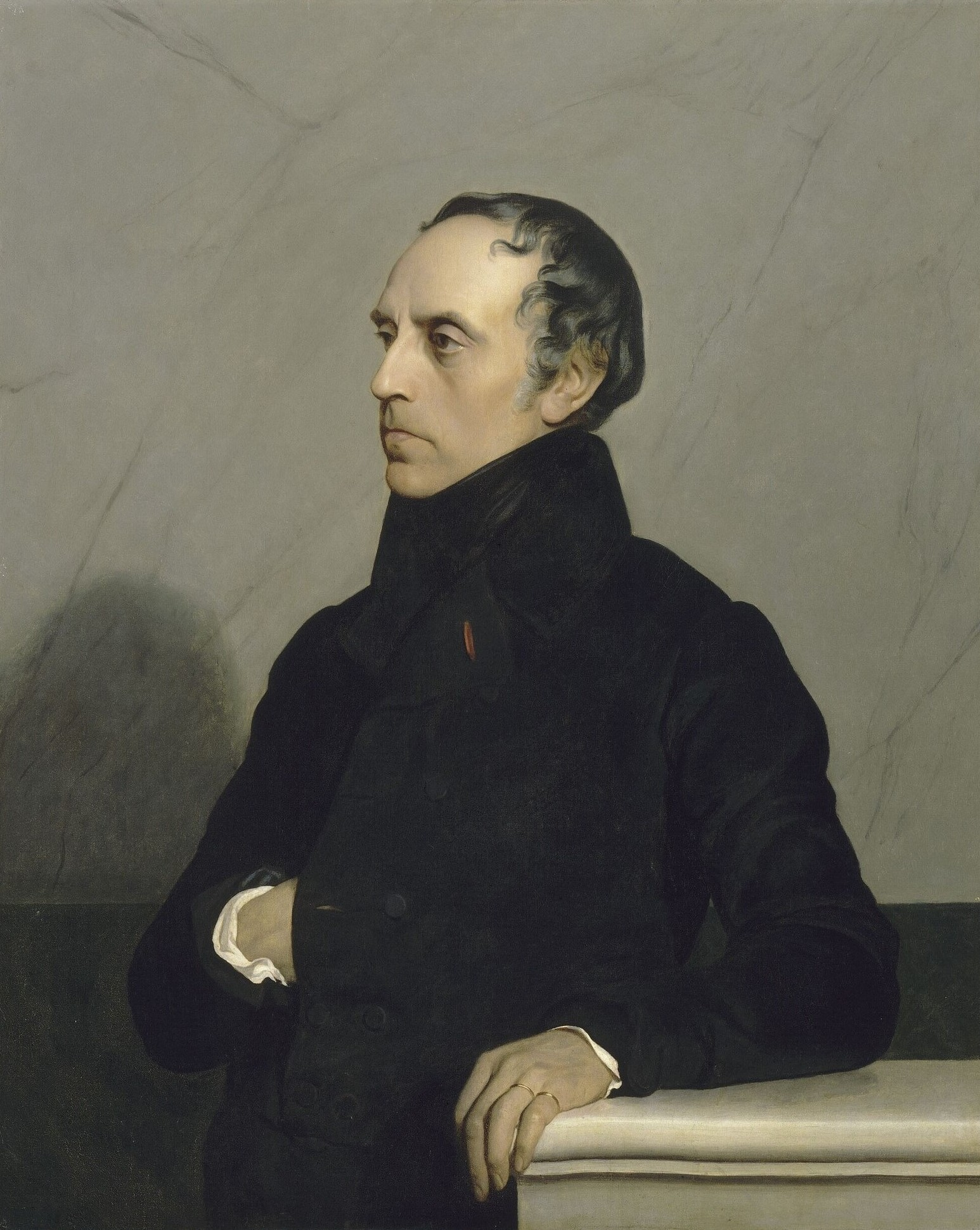

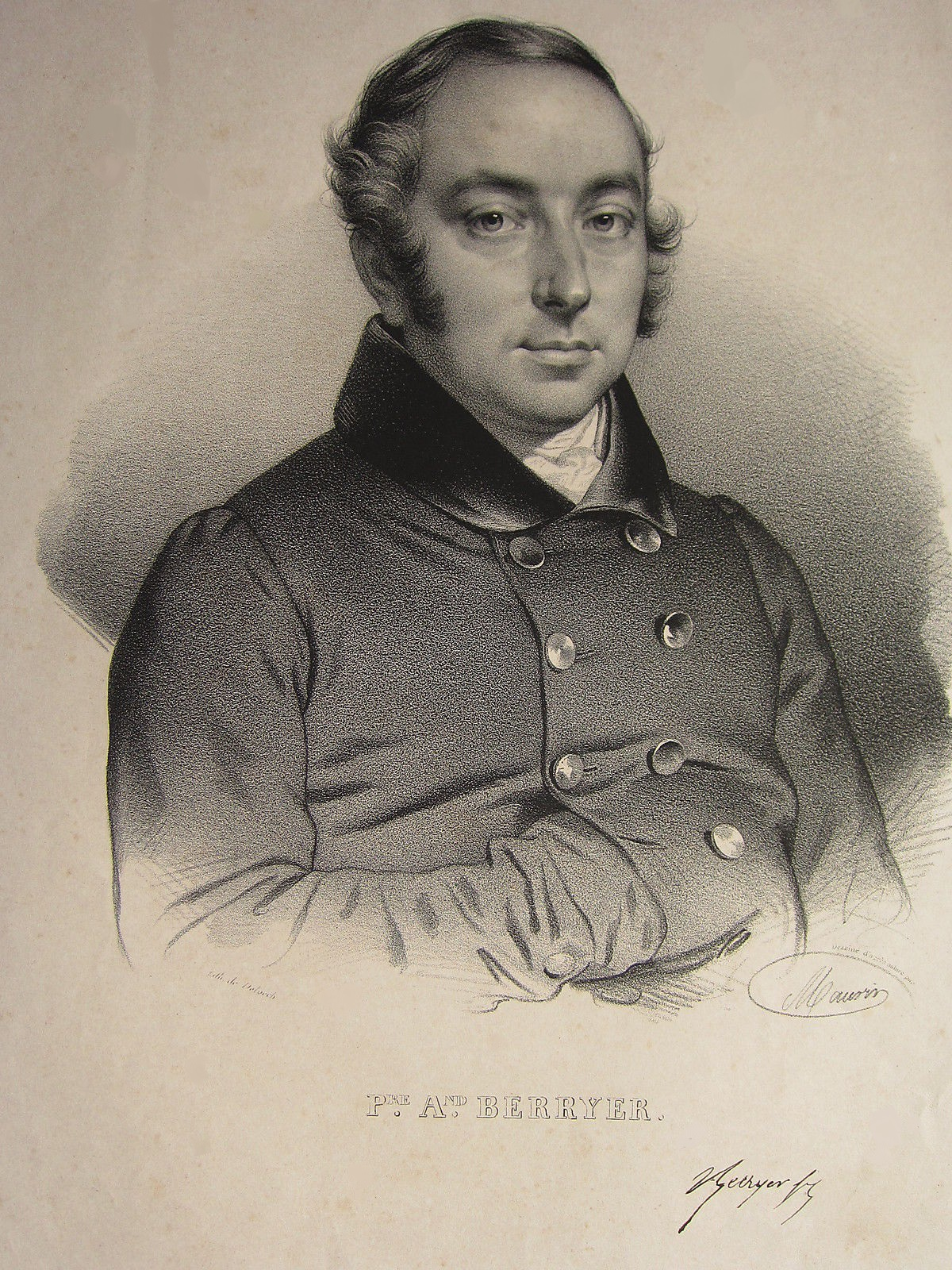
	First party	Second party	Third party
Leader	François Arago	François Guizot	Pierre-Antoine Berryer
Party	Opposition	Ministerial	Legitimists
Seats won	240	199	20
Prime Minister before election
Louis-Mathieu Molé
Ministerial
Elected Prime Minister
Jean-de-Dieu Soult

Legislative elections were held in France on 2 and 6 March 1839. Only citizens paying taxes were eligible to vote.

== Results ==
Party	Votes	%	Seats
Opposition			240
Ministerials			199
Legitimists			20
Total			459
Total votes	164,862	–	
Registered voters/turnout	201,271	81.91	
Source: Frémy and Caramani

== Aftermath ==
Louis-Philippe of France did not have a majority and dissolved the legislature on 16 June 1842.
