= Charter of 1830 =

Document of France's July Monarchy

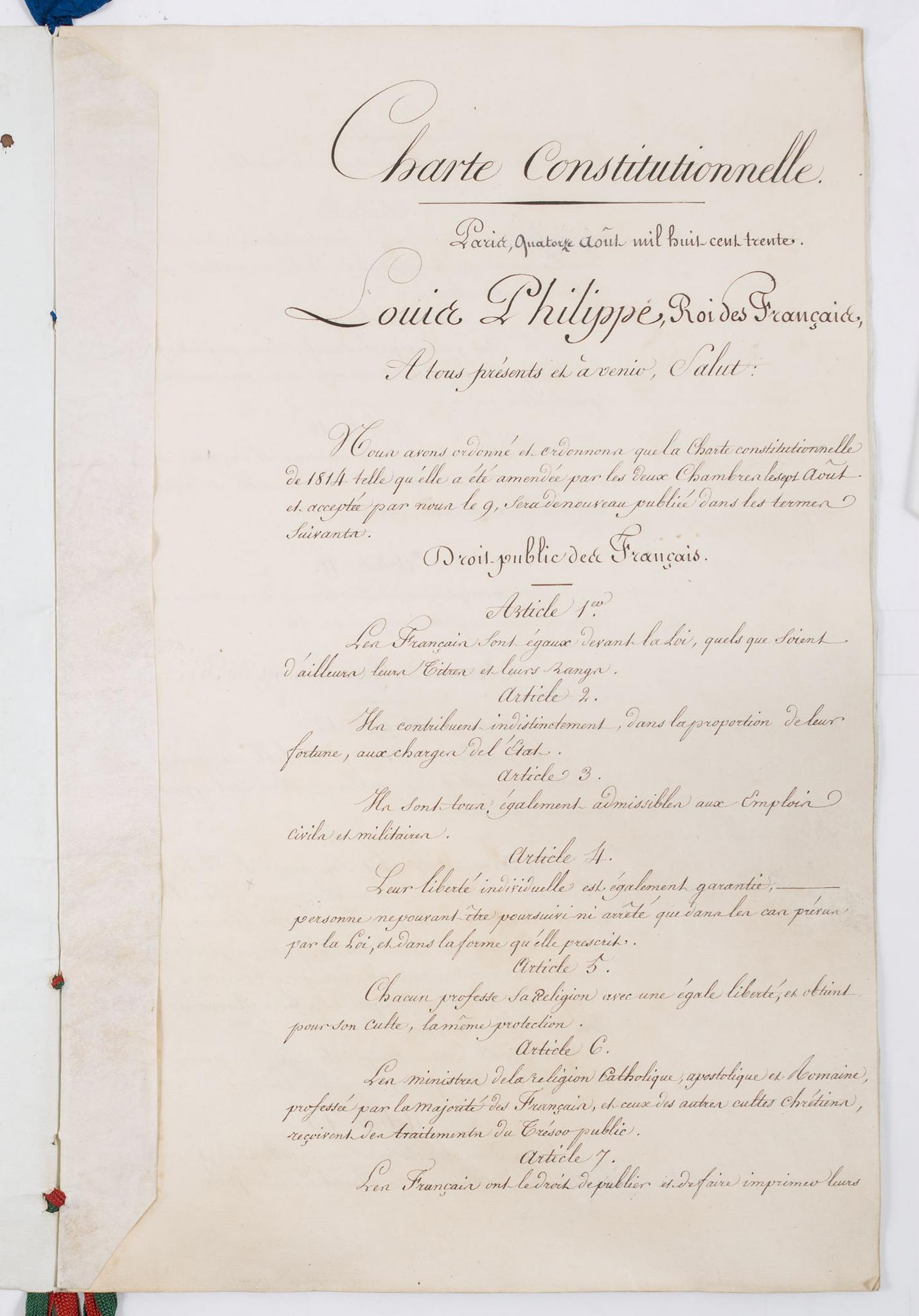

Overview
- Original title: Charte constitutionnelle du 14 août 1830
- Jurisdiction: France
- Created: 7 August 1830
- Date effective: 14 August 1830
- System: Unitary parliamentary constitutional monarchy
- Head of state: Monarch
- Chambers: Bicameral (Chamber of Peers and Chamber of Deputies)
- Repealed: 24 February 1848
- Author: Chamber of Deputies
- Supersedes: Charter of 1814
- Superseded by: French Constitution of 1848

Full text
- French Constitutional Charter of 1830 at Wikisource
- Charte constitutionnelle du 14 août 1830 at French Wikisource

The Charter of 1830 depicted in the Coat of Arms of the Kingdom of the French from 1831–1848.

The Charter of 1830 (French: Charte de 1830) instigated the July Monarchy in France. It was considered a compromise between constitutional monarchists and republicans.

== History ==
After three days of protests in July 1830 – the July Revolution, also called the "Three Glorious Days" (les trois glorieuses) – by the merchant bourgeoisie, who were outraged to be ousted from the limited voters list by the July Ordinances, Charles X was forced to abdicate. Charles X's chosen successor was his young grandson, Henri, comte de Chambord, but Henri never ascended to the throne. The line of natural hereditary succession was abolished and a member of the cadet Orléans line of the Bourbon family was chosen: Louis Philippe I.

On August 7, the Charter of 1814 was revised, and its preamble evoking the Ancien Régime was eliminated. When voted on in the Chamber, it was passed by 219 votes to 33. The new charter was imposed on the king by the nation and not promulgated by the king. On 9 August 1830, Louis-Philippe d'Orléans swore to uphold the Charter and was crowned "King of the French" (roi des Français) rather than "King of France" (roi de France). The July Monarchy lasted until 24 February 1848 when the Second Republic was established.

== Constitutional provisions ==
The Charter of 1830 removed from the king the power to make ordinances for the security of the state; royal ordinances were henceforth to concern only the application of laws. Hereditary peerage was eliminated, but not the institution of peerage. The initiation of the laws was no longer exclusive of the king, and members of both chambers could propose bills. The census suffrage system was modified and the poll tax (cens) was reduced to 200 francs permitting individuals 25 years old or older to vote, and to 500 francs for individuals 30 years old or older to be elected to the Chamber of Deputies. The law of the Double vote was abolished, and the number of electors was thus doubled, without nevertheless significantly increasing the size or characteristics of the electoral body: 1 out of 170 Frenchmen participated in the elections with the electorate at 170,000 which increased to 240,000 by 1846.

Catholicism was no longer the state religion, but only the "religion professed by the majority of the French", censorship of the press was abolished, and the French tricolor flag was reinstated.

== See also ==
- Constitution of France
- Politics of France
- History of France
