= Chambre introuvable =

French Chamber of Deputies elected in 1815

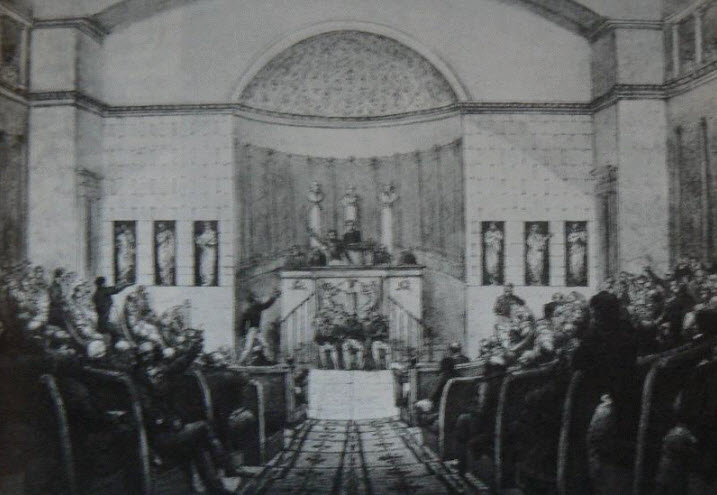
The deputies of the Chambre introuvable.

The Chambre introuvable (French for "Unobtainable Chamber") was the first Chamber of Deputies elected after the Second Bourbon Restoration in 1815. It was dominated by Ultra-royalists who completely refused to accept the results of the French Revolution. The name was coined by King Louis XVIII, referring to the impossibility of cooperating with the chamber.

== History ==
The elections held on 14 August 1815, under census suffrage and the impact of the "White Terror", produced a heavy Ultra-royalist majority: 350 of the 402 members were Ultra-royalists.

The "Unobtainable Chamber", which was first assembled on 7 October 1815, was characterized by its zeal in favour of the aristocracy and the clergy and aimed at reestablishing the Ancien Régime. The Chambre introuvable banned the display of tricolor flags, voted for the establishment of military provost-marshal courts, and banished all of the Conventionnels who had voted for Louis XVI's execution. The chamber pursued its militant policy even in defiance of the king himself, proclaiming Vive le roi, quand même ("Long live the king, no matter what").

Louis XVIII, confronted with rising discontent in French society, followed the counsels of a group of figures including the liberal leader Élie, Duke of Decazes; the Duke of Richelieu, prime minister since September 1815; the Duke of Wellington, the British commander of the occupation troops; and the Russian ambassador Pozzo di Borgo, and dissolved the Chamber on 5 September 1816.

The subsequent elections resulted in the Ultras being temporarily replaced by the moderate royalist Ministériels and the more liberal Doctrinaires, who attempted to reconcile the Revolution's legacy with the monarchy.

When the Ultra-royalists regained their parliamentary majority at the elections of February–March 1824, the resulting chamber was dubbed the Chambre retrouvée, the "Recovered Chamber", in reference to the Chambre introuvable.

== See also ==
- France in the nineteenth century
- Bourbon Restoration
- Cavalier Parliament
