= 1819 French legislative election =

← 1818	11 September 1819	1820 →

49 seats in the Chamber of Deputies
	First party	Second party
Party	Liberal Party	Ministerials
Seats won	37	5
	Third party	Fourth party
Party	Ultra-royalist	Doctrinaires
Seats won	3	1

Partial legislative elections were held in France on 11 September 1819, during the Second Restoration, to choose delegates to the French Chamber of Deputies. It was the third of three elections (the others coming in 1817 and 1818) under a new law that called for legislative elections to be held annually in one-fifth of the nation's departments.

For the third straight election, the Liberals made a strong showing, winning 37 seats. The election of Henri Grégoire caused a scandal, as he was a famous member of the convention, which forced the government of Decazes to cancel this election. Nevertheless, the liberal group represented nearly one-third of the Lower House after this partial election, whereas the Ultras were reduced to 30 MPs.

== Results ==
Party	Seats
Liberal Party	37
Ministerials	5
Ultra-royalists	5
Doctrinaires	1
Affiliation unclear	1
Total	49
Source: Journal des débats
