= 1816 election =

1816 election may refer to:

- 1816 French legislative election
- 1816 United States presidential election
- United States House of Representatives elections, 1816 and 1817
