= 1820 election =

1820 election can refer to:

- 1820 French legislative election
- 1820 United States presidential election
- 1820 United States House of Representatives elections
