= 1824 election =

1824 election may refer to:

- 1824 French legislative election
- 1824 United States presidential election
- 1824 United States House of Representatives elections
