= 1817 French legislative election =

- 20 September 1817

Partial legislative elections were held in France on 20 September 1817, during the Second Restoration, to choose delegates to the Chamber of Deputies. It was the first of three elections (the others coming in 1818 and 1819) under a new law that called for legislative elections to be held annually in one-fifth of the nation's departments.

The election was a clear defeat for the Ultras, who lost all their seats. Until then confined to a few individuals, the liberals, led by the banker Jacques Laffitte, constituted a second opposition group at the left of the Government.
