= Liberal Party (Bourbon Restoration) =

Former political party of France

Liberals Libéraux
- Leader: Gilbert du Motier Marquis of La Fayette
- Founder: Gilbert du Motier Marquis of La Fayette
- Founded: 1817; 209 years ago
- Dissolved: 1824; 202 years ago
- Merged into: Doctrinaires
- Ideology: Majority: • Constitutional monarchy; • Liberalism; • Industrialism; Factions: • Economic liberalism; • Republicanism
- Political position: Centre-left
- Colours: Yellow
- Chamber of Representatives (1815): 510 / 630

The Liberals (French: Libéraux) was a short lived French liberal political party during the Restoration era, and was active in several elections before being absorbed into the Doctrinaires, a fellow constitutional monarchy party. Several members of the Liberals eventually went on to serve in the Movement Party and even later in the Orléanist parties. The precedent set by the party would help form modern French classical liberalism, something used in the modern centre-right Republicans party.

== First Liberals ==
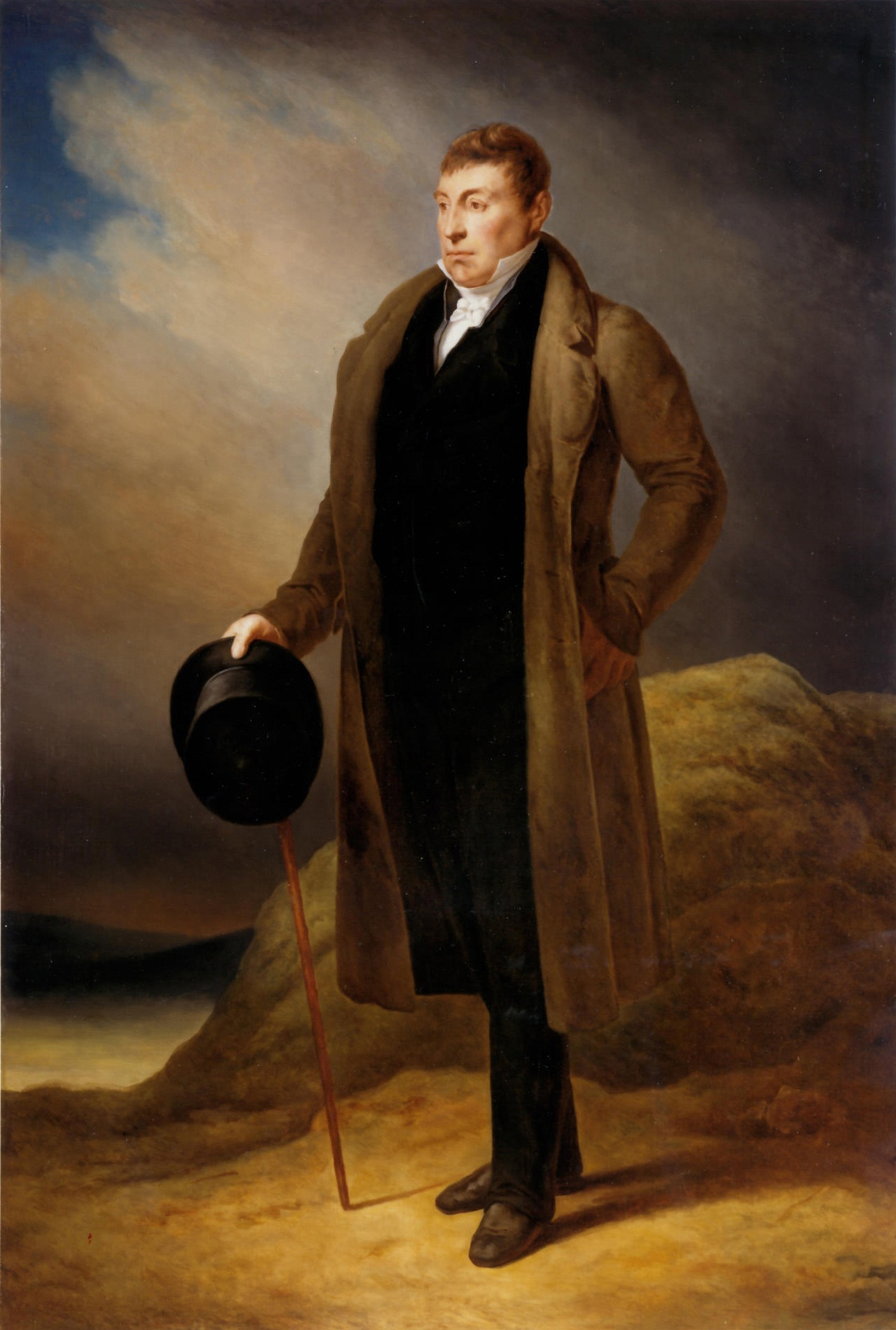
Portrait of the Marquis de La Fayette. The Marquis led the Liberals during the May 1815 elections, but after Napoleon's abdication retired from political life until the 1831 elections. The Marquis was seen as one of the great leaders of the party, and even during the Revolution favoured a limited monarchy with strong popular representation.

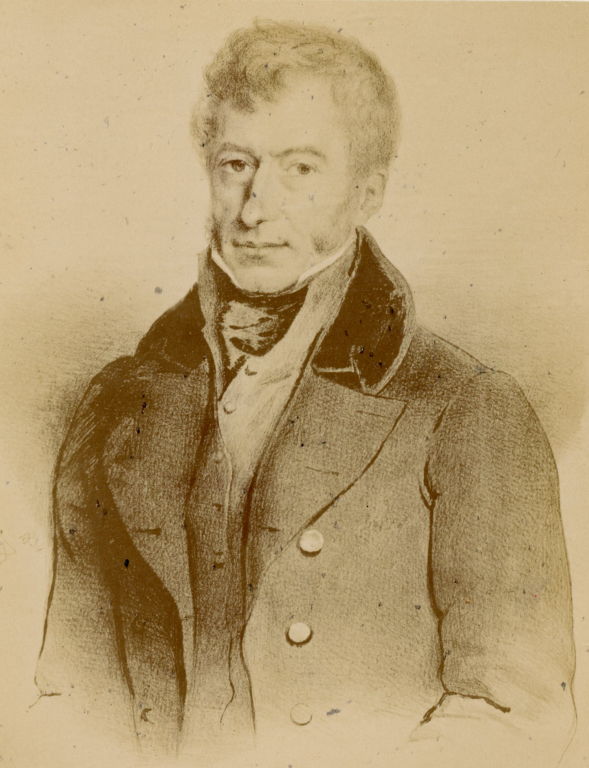
Portrait of the Marquis d'Argenson. The Marquis was the successor to the Marquis de La Fayette, and was seen as more liberal, though more shy than the former leader. He led the party during the 1817 and 1819 by-elections, but was replaced by the more liberal and outspoken Benjamin Constant during the 1820 elections.

Following the Charter of 1814, the new constitutional Kingdom of France was set up after the First Abdication of Napoleon. The new charter called for the creation of a two-house legislature, with the King retaining some of his power and titles. The new Kingdom was deemed a "constitutional, but not parliamentary, monarchy", leaving the King and his ministers with considerable power. One of the parts of this new charter was forced by the "Liberals", which would eventually bond together to form the Liberals party. This part, becoming known as the 'Liberal Article' called for selective suffrage to be adopted. This is granted to men of at least 40 years of age, who are charged 1,000 French francs of direct tax. Given these conditions, the politically active citizens amount to 100,000 voters and 15,000 eligibles.

Following Napoleon's return, the Charter of 1814 became nulled, and a new charter, the Charter of 1815 was signed on 22 April 1815. The new charter was written by a future leader of the party, Benjamin Constant. During the subsequent elections held between 8 and 22 May 1815, the Liberals, now a fully formed party win in a landslide, capturing 510 seats in the 630 seat chamber. The party's win over the Bonapartists (80 seats) and Jacobin Republicans (40 seats), was seen by Napoleon as a direct answer to his return, and consequently began working with the Liberals during the Hundred Days. During the May election, the party was led by the famed Gilbert du Motier, Marquis of La Fayette and stood on a centre-left constitutional platform, designed to support Napoleon while holding him accountable. The May 1815 election was the only time the Liberals held a super-majority (indeed a simply majority) and held government.

== Party formation ==
After Napoleon's Second Abdication, the three parties in the Chamber of Representatives (Liberals, Bonapartists, and Jacobin Republicans) were forcefully disbanded and their members shunned from political life. Some Liberals joined the newly formed Doctrinaires, which in all but name were the same as the former Liberals. Many Liberals however, decided to try and run for election unsuccessfully during the August 1815 legislative election, which ended in a super majority for the new Ultra-royalists.

The 1816 legislative election, held just one year later however had a different outcome, when (on the recommendation of Armand-Emmanuel de Vignerot du Plessis, Duke of Richelieu) 'non-governmental parties' were allowed to run. The Duke defended his proposal to the King by stating that, if he were to allow the 'opposition parties' to run, the people would have a better view of the King and see him as a constitutionalist supporting all sides. The new Liberals now supported the constitutional monarchy, but wanted to see elections become more fair and expand through limited suffrage. In the elections, the Doctrinaires obtained 136 seats, or roughly 52.7% of the vote and the 'New Liberals' obtained 10 seats or 3.9% of the vote.

The Liberals as a 'party' however, weren't officially formed until the elections partial elections in 1817. In accordance with the 1814 Charter, and indeed an election system which mirrored that of the Constitution of the Year III (1795), a third of the assembly was to be elected yearly. In the 1817 partial legislative election, the Ultras lost all their seats up for grabs, the Doctrinaires gained 39 seats, and the Liberals gained 12. The 1819 partial legislative election saw even more seats lost by the ultras, gaining just 5, while the Doctrinaires gained 13 seats and the Liberals gained 35 seats. Following the results of the election, the Liberals controlled roughly 1/3 of the assembly.

The 1820 legislative election further expanded the Liberal's influence winning 23 more seats for a total of 80. During the election, 16,920 votes were cast for the Liberals, or roughly 18.4%. The election marked a turning point for the party, and would be its last election.

== Decline ==
In February 1820, before that year's legislative election, Charles Ferdinand d'Artois, Duke of Berry, the nephew of the king, was assassinated by a fanatic who claimed to be a member of the "Liberals". The Prime Minister, Elie Louis, Duke of Decazes and Glücksbierg was held indirectly for the crime by the ultra-royalists and forced to resign from the government. This forceful resignation leaves a stain on both the Liberals and Doctrinaires, leading to the downfall of the former. In the 1824 legislative election, the Liberals lost all their seats and the Doctrinaires didn't fare much better, only winning 17 seats of out 430 up for grabs. This marked the end of the Liberals, though many of their former members joined the Doctrinaires.

In the 1827 legislative election, the Marquis de La Fayette re-joined the Doctrinaires and subsequently many liberals joined the party following their old leader. Because of the massive influx of liberals, the Doctrinaires' political stance shifted from maintaining the Charter of 1814 to becoming more critical of King Charles X, and in part would help spark the 1830 French revolution. These new Doctrinaires became known, from 1824; once again as they had back in 1815; as the "Liberal Doctrinaires".

== Ideology ==
The "Left-Centre", later the Liberals, was made up of men who supported moderate Liberalism. Like the "Right-Centre", or Doctrinaires, this group believed in the honest execution of the 1814 Charter, but it also believed that the Charter should be extended towards greater democracy. The "Extreme-Left", usually referred to simply as "The Left", or the "Republicans", carried the Liberals' views further, and in its ranks were some avowed enemies of the dynasty. This "Republicans" consisted of what is referred to today as Bonapartists (whose political party was disbanded following the Second Restoration), Orléanists (a term not used until 1830), and some few Jacobins (referred to as the Republicans, ironically). Most of the ablest men of the Chamber of Deputies had their seats on the Left, sometimes in the Left-Centre, and sometimes with the Left, the division not always being very clearly marked. The leaders of the Liberals included: Benjamin Constant, Jacques-Antoine Manuel, Jacques Laffitte, Casimir Pierre Périer, Marc-René de Voyer de Paulmy, Marquis d'Argenson, and Gilbert du Motier, Marquis de La Fayette.

== Societies ==
In 1818, a number of radical deputies and peers, including the Marquis de La Fayette, Jacques-Charles Dupont de l'Eure, the Marquis d'Argenson, and Jacques-Antoine Manuel, formed connections with several secret societies: L'Union (The Union), Les Amis de la Presse (The Friends of the Press), and Les Amis de la Vérité (The Friends of the Truth). These secret societies, about which little is known, included some Freemasons, and a large number of former French Imperial Army officers on half-pay. Their programme was vague. Some were Bonapartists, and a lesser number were Republicans. All agreed in their hatred of the present régime and in their devotion to the Tricolor. Several of these secret societies united to start a military uprising in Alsace in 1821, but it failed completely.

In 1821, there was founded at Saumur in the Pays de la Loire, a new secret society, the Chevaliers de la Liberté (Knights of Liberty). This was soon united with the other secret societies into a large organisation on the model of the Italian Carbonari. At the centre of this "French Carbornari" society was "La Haute Vente" or "The High Twenty", under which were the "Ventes Centrals" or "Central Twenty", and finally the "Ventes Particulières" or "Twenty Individuals". All France was soon covered by the network of these societies. The recruits were largely soldiers, though many were also lawyers, doctors, and journalists. No effort was made to affiliate the working classes. The prosperity which prevailed at the time, the general bourgeoisie fear of revolution, and the indifference of the peasants, kept the movement from gaining any great national following. Among the members were the Marquis de La Fayette and a group of deputies, Victor Cousin the philosopher, Augustin Thierry the historian, and Jean-Antoine Dubois and Dubois, who in 1824 founded The Globe. Every member swore to absolute secrecy and obedience to orders, and all agreed to keep ready a gun and fifty cartridges. The symbolism, which was elaborate and included secret passwords and handshakes, was all imitated from the Freemasonic lodges.

== Electoral results ==
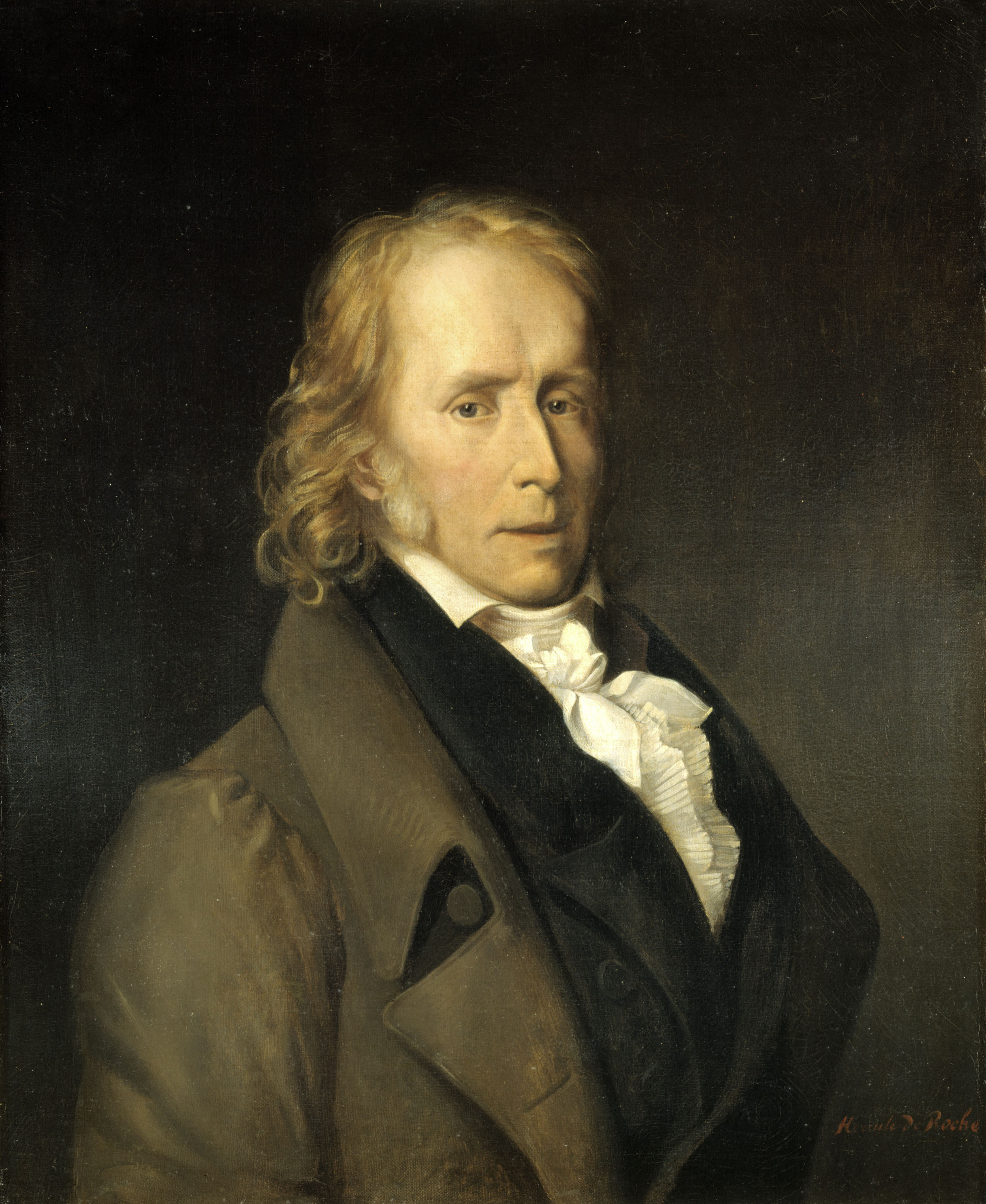
c. 1820 portrait of Benjamin Constant made just before the 1820 legislative elections where he led the party during their tenure as a major opposition group in the Chamber. Constant was described as an outspoken member of the Chamber, and the Ultras constantly tried to silence him.

Election year	No. of overall votes	% of overall vote	No. of overall seats won	+/–	Position	Leader
Chamber of Representatives
May 1815	26,356 (1st)	80.95%	510 / 630	New	1st (majority)	Gilbert du Motier, Marquis of La Fayette
Chamber of Deputies
1816	3,760 (4th)	3.9%	10 / 258	▼500	3rd (minority)	Marc-René de Voyer, Marquis d'Argenson
1817 (partial)			22 / 258	▲12	3rd (minority)	Marc-René de Voyer, Marquis d'Argenson
1819 (partial)			57 / 258	▲35	3rd (minority)	Marc-René de Voyer, Marquis d'Argenson
1820	16,920 (3rd)	18.43%	80 / 434	▲23	3rd (minority)	Benjamin Constant

== In the French political spectrum ==
The French assembly was indeed the first of the European legislatures to have their members grouped by party and sit on the "wings". The Ultras sat on the "Right wing", indicating their closeness to the monarch (Right wing), the Doctrinaires just to their left (Centre-Right), then the Liberals in the "Centre-Left", and the Republicans on the left (Left-wing). Because of their location, Liberals became known as members of the Centre-left political spectrum.
