= 1818 French legislative election =

- 17 June – 19 July 1818
	First party	Second party
Party	Liberals	Ministerials
Seats won	22	17
	Third party	Fourth party
Party	Liberal-adjacents	Ultra-royalist
Seats won	10	4

Partial legislative elections were held in France in 1818, during the Bourbon Restoration. The election resulted in little change in the party-makeup parliament. However, deputies from the Napoleonic era saw a continued resurgence in the Parliament, while those from the Kingdom of France saw a continued decline.

== Results ==
Party	Seats
Liberals	22
Ministerials	17
Liberal-adjacents	10
Ultra-royalist	4
Total	53
Source: Varia
