= 1816 French legislative election =

- 25 September and 4 October 1816

258 of the 309 seats in the Chamber of Deputies 155 seats needed for a majority
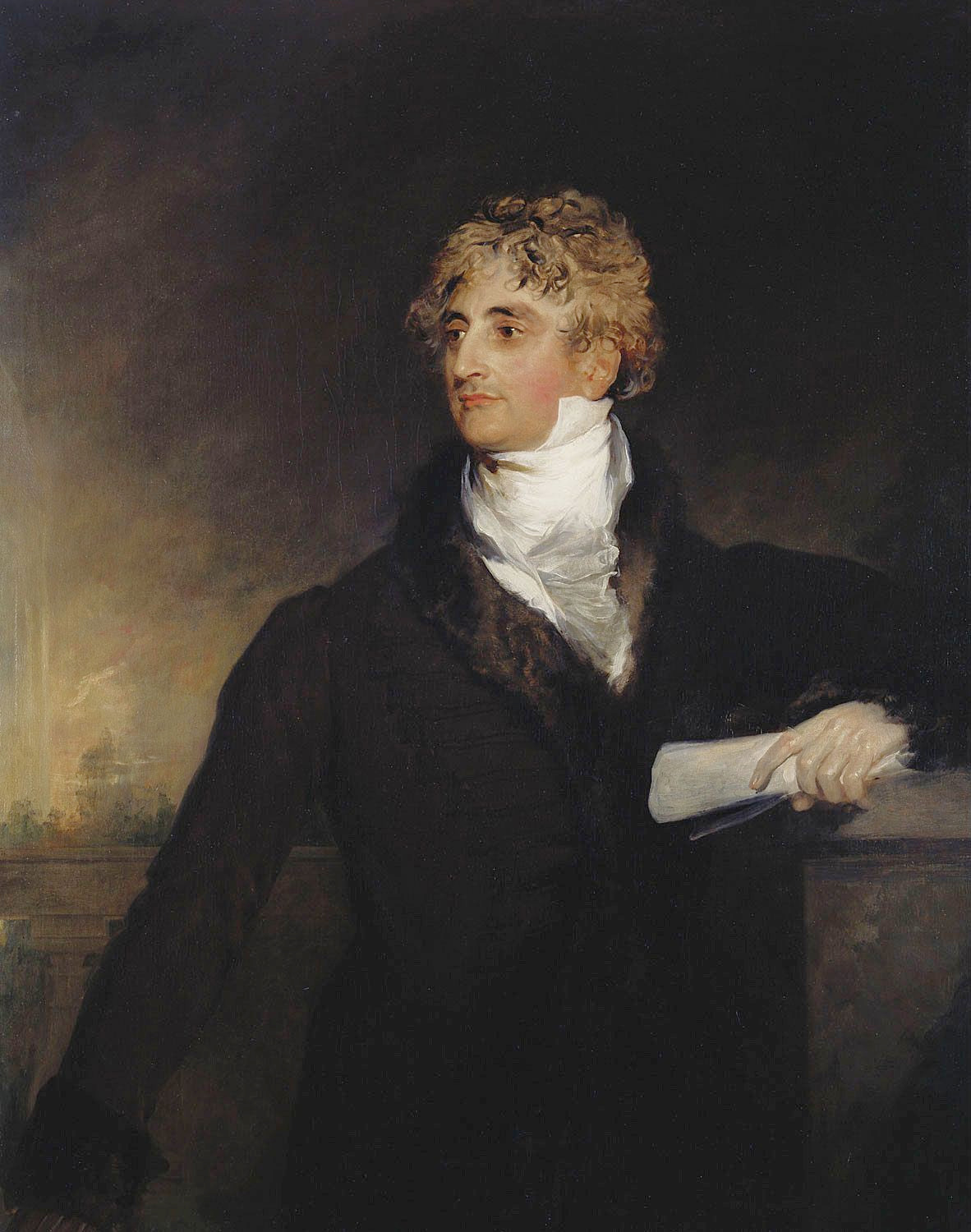

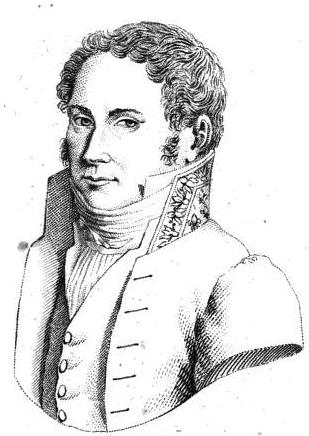

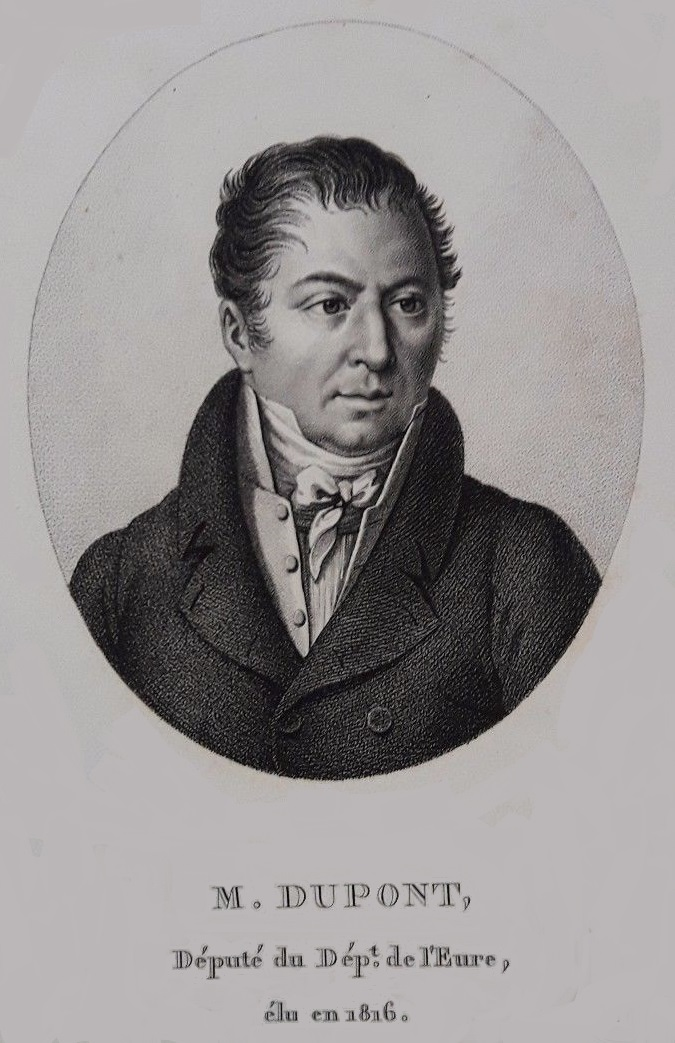

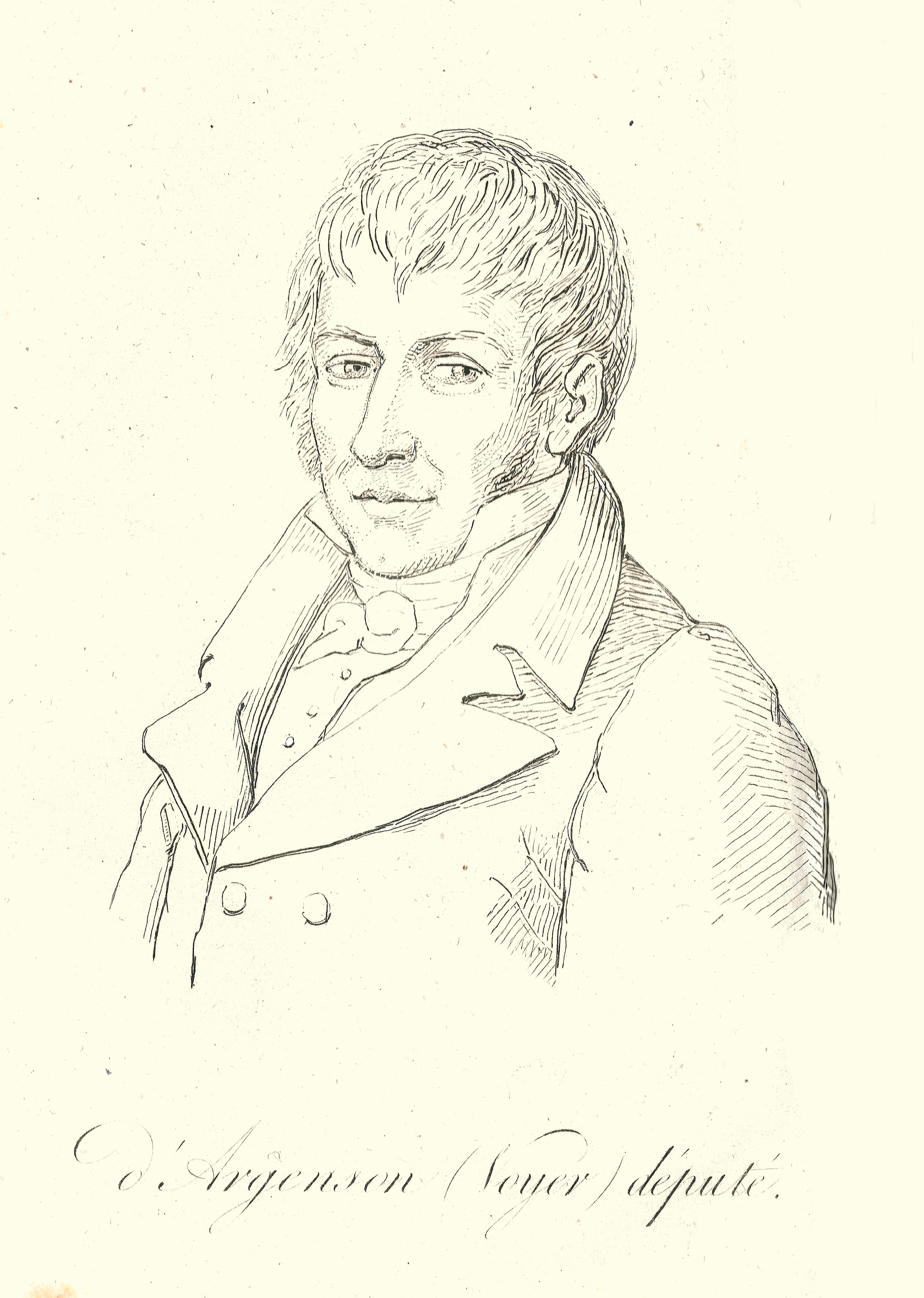
	First party	Second party
Leader	Armand Emmanuel de Vignerot du Plessis	François-Régis de La Bourdonnaye
Party	Doctrinaires	Ultra-royalist
Seats won	136	92
	Third party	Fourth party
Leader	Jacques-Charles Dupont de l'Eure	Marc-René de Voyer de Paulmy d'Argenson
Party	Republicans–Bonapartists	Liberals
Seats won	20	10
Prime Minister before election
The Duke of Richelieu
Independent
Elected Prime Minister
The Duke of Richelieu
Independent

Legislative elections were held in France on 25 September and 4 October 1816 to elect the first legislature of the Second Restoration. Voters elected three-fifths of all deputies in the first round. In the second round, the most heavily taxed voted again to elect the remaining two-fifths of deputies. Only citizens paying taxes were eligible to vote.

== Results ==
Party	Seats
Moderate Royalists	136
Ultra-royalists	92
Republicans and Bonapartists	20
Liberals	10
Total	258
Source: Election Politique
