= 1824 French legislative election =

- 25 February 1824 (first round); 6 March 1824 (second round)

All 428 seats in the Chamber of Deputies 215 seats needed for a majority

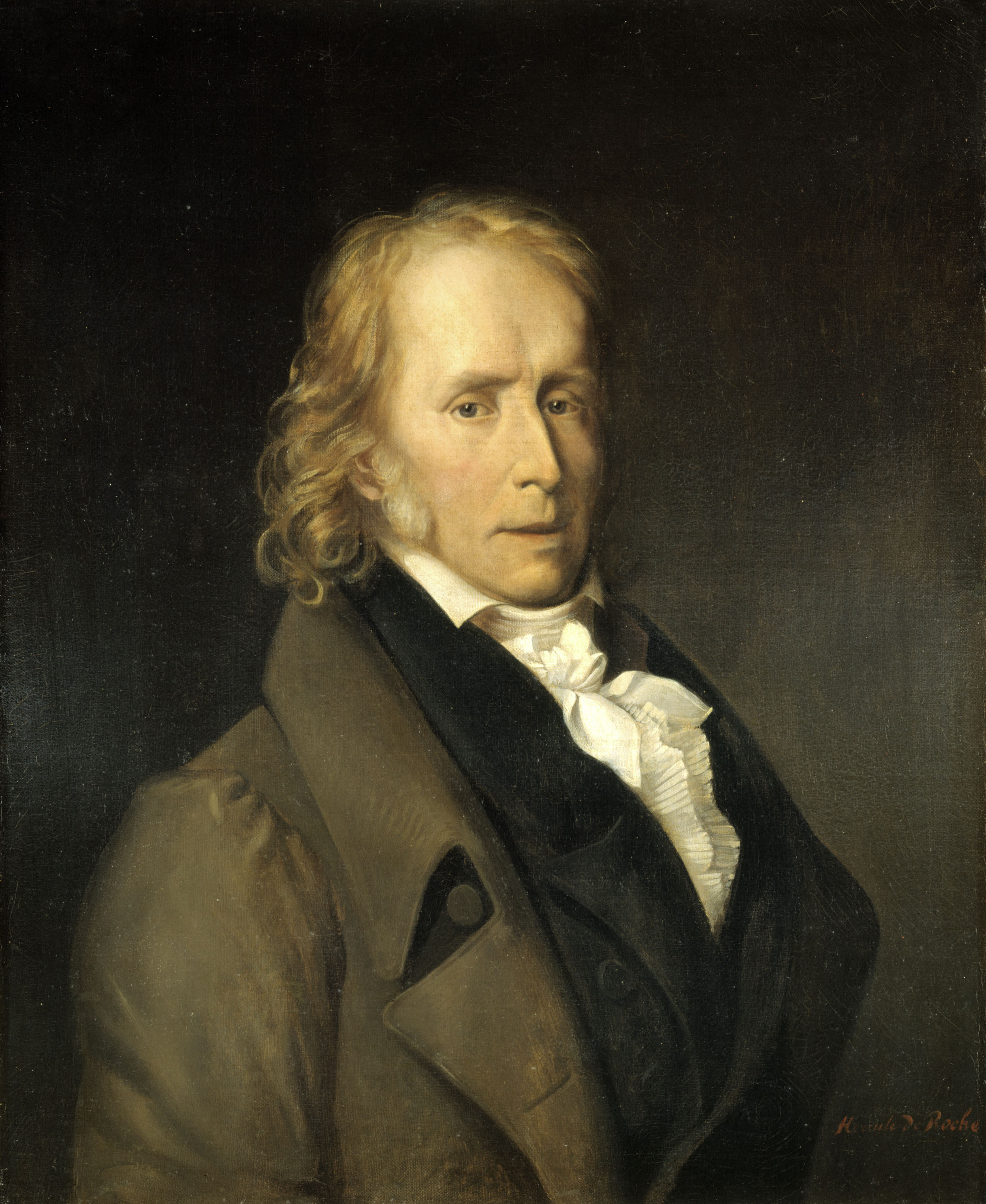
	First party	Second party
Leader		Benjamin Constant
Party	Rightists	Liberal
Seats won	411	17
Prime Minister before election
Joseph de Villèle
Ultra-royalist
Elected Prime Minister
Joseph de Villèle
Ultra-royalist

Legislative elections were held in France on 25 February and 6 March 1824. The election was an overwhelming victory for Villèle and rightists, as only 17 MPs of the opposition were re-elected (including Royer-Collard, Cécile Stanilas de Girardin, Benjamin Constant and Maximilien Sébastien Foy).

== Electoral system ==
Only male citizens paying taxes were eligible to vote.

== Results ==
Party	Seats
Rightists	411
Liberal Party	17
Total	428
Source: Election Politique
