= 1820 French legislative election =

- 4 November 1820 (first round); 13 November 1820 (second round)

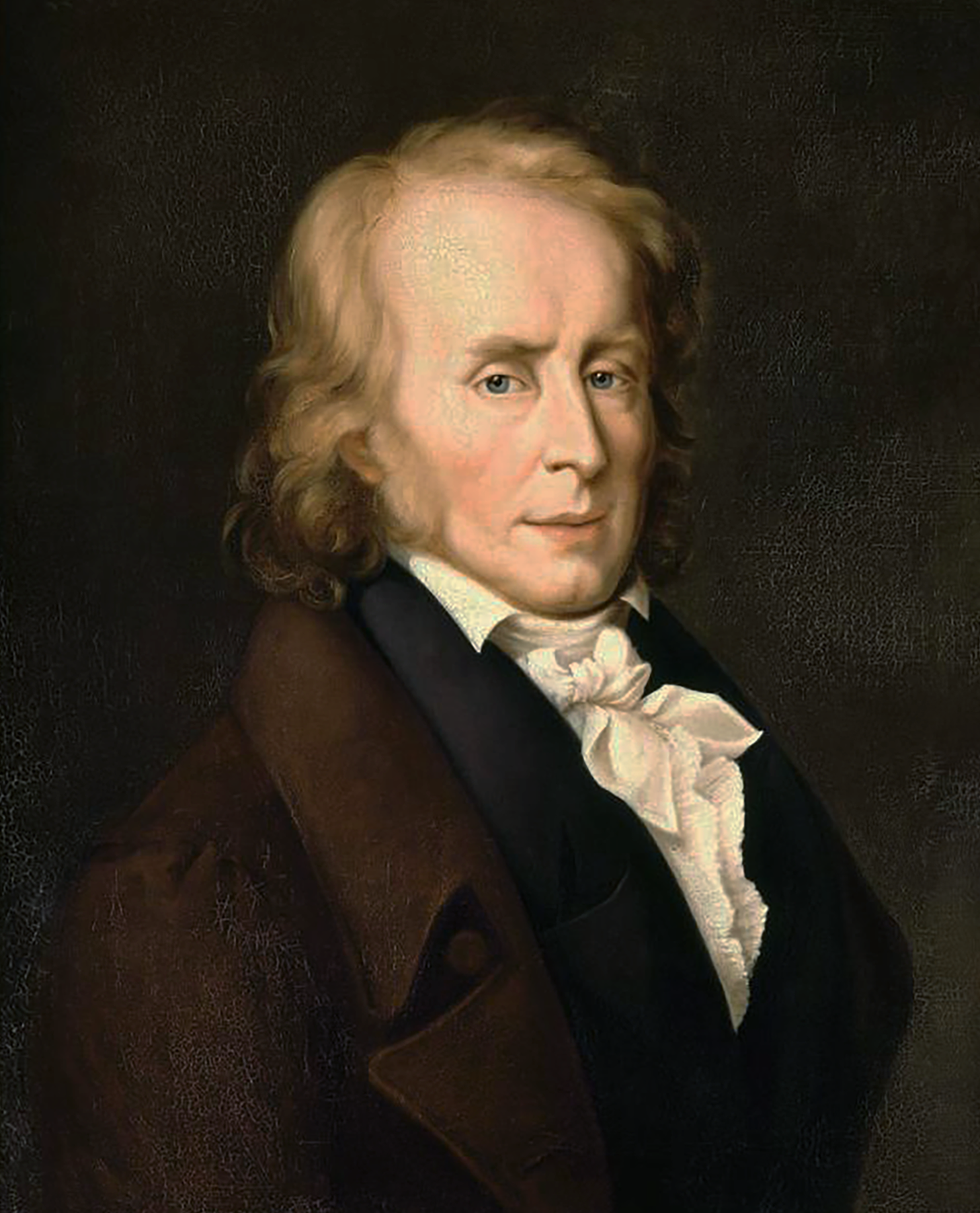
	First party	Second party
Leader		Benjamin Constant
Party	Rightists	Liberal
Seats won	187	33
Prime Minister before election
Armand Emmanuel de Vignerot du Plessis
Doctrinaire
Elected Prime Minister
Armand Emmanuel de Vignerot du Plessis
Doctrinaire

Partial legislative elections were held in France on 4 and 13 November 1820.

== Process ==
Only citizens paying taxes were eligible to vote. All electors elected three-fifths of all deputies in the first round. In the second round, the most heavily taxed voted again to elect the remaining two-fifths of deputies. Only around 94,000 people were eligible to vote.

== Results ==
Party	Seats
Rightists	187
Liberals	33
Total	220
Source: Election Politique
