= Paris Municipal Commission Ministry of 1830 =

French government ministry of 1830

- France; Cabinet of France
- Date formed: 31 July 1830
- Date dissolved: 1 August 1830

History
- Predecessor: Ministry of Casimir de Rochechouart de Mortemart
- Successor: French Provisional Ministry of 1830

The Paris Municipal Commission Ministry of 1830 was proclaimed by the Paris Municipal Commission on 31 July 1830, after the revolution in which the Bourbon Restoration monarchy was deposed. One day later, it was replaced by a provisional government named by Louis Philippe I of Orléans.

== Formation ==
The Ordinances of 25 July 1830 suspended the constitution. Paris was calm the next day, although there were stirrings of protest against the blows the ordinances had dealt against the powers of the legislators and the press. Most of the deputies in Paris met at Casimir Pierre Périer's house on 27 July, but although they made speeches and were urged to act by Audry de Puyraveau, François Mauguin and Labbey de Pompières, they were unwilling to launch a protest. The deputies from the Left met at Audry's house on 28 July. On 29 July 1830, the deputies met at Jacques Laffitte's house and named an interim Municipal Commission composed of Jacques Laffitte, Casimir Pierre Périer, Georges Mouton, Auguste de Schonen, Pierre-François Audry de Puyraveau and François Mauguin. General Lafayette was appointed commander of the National Guard.

== Ministers ==
The Municipal Commission announced the ministers on 31 July 1830. They were:

Portfolio	Holder	Party
Paris Municipal Commission	Casimir Perier	Constitutional (Legitimist)
Paris Municipal Commission	Marshal Georges Mouton	Constitutional (Orléanist)
Paris Municipal Commission	François Mauguin	Constitutional (Republican)
Paris Municipal Commission	Pierre-François Audry	Constitutional (Republican)
Paris Municipal Commission	Auguste de Schonen	Constitutional (Orléanist)
Ministers
Minister of the Interior	The Duke of Broglie	Constitutional (Orléanist)
Minister of Public Works	The Duke of Broglie	Constitutional (Orléanist)
Minister of Justice	Jacques-Charles Dupont	Constitutional (Republican)
Minister of Foreign Affairs	The Baron Bignon	Constitutional (Orléanist)
Minister of War	Marshal Count Gérard	Constitutional (Orléanist)
Minister of the Navy	Admiral Count of Rigny	None
Minister of Finance	The Baron Louis	Constitutional (Orléanist)
Minister of Public Education	François Guizot	Constitutional (Orléanist)

== Replacement ==
Louis Philippe entered Paris on 31 July 1830 and, according to Louis Blanc, "the revolution was betrayed". The municipal commission and Lafayette created a movable National Guard, in which soldiers would be paid 30 sous per day. This was not put into effect, but served to help the people disperse and disarm. Louis Philippe was declared Lieutenant-General of France on 31 July 1830. On 2 August 1830, Charles X of France formally abdicated, and on 9 August 1830, Louis Philippe took the oath of office as King.
