= Ministry of Casimir de Rochechouart de Mortemart =

French government ministry of 1830

- Cabinet of France

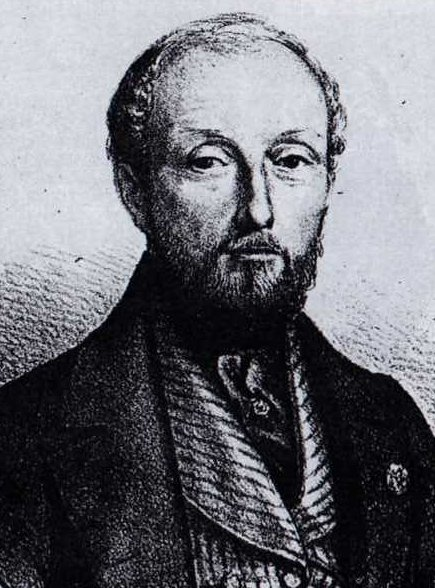
- Casimir de Rochechouart de Mortemart
- Date formed: 29 July 1830
- Date dissolved: 29 July 1830

People and organisations
- Head of state: Charles X of France
- Head of government: Casimir de Rochechouart de Mortemart

History
- Predecessor: Ministry of Jules de Polignac
- Successor: Paris Municipal Commission Ministry

The Ministry of Casimir de Rochechouart de Mortemart was announced on 29 July 1830 by King Charles X of France during the last day of the Bourbon Restoration. Later that day the ministry was replaced by the Paris Municipal Commission.

== Ministers ==
The ministers were:

Portfolio	Holder	Party
President of the Council of Ministers	The Duke of Mortemart	Conservative
Ministers
Minister of Foreign Affairs	The Duke of Mortemart	Conservative
Minister of Finance	Casimir Perier	Constitutional
Minister of War	General The Count Gérard	None

Later that day the deputies who remained present in Paris met at Lafitte's house and named an interim Municipal Commission composed of Jacques Laffitte, Casimir Pierre Périer, Georges Mouton, Auguste de Schonen, Pierre-François Audry de Puyraveau and François Mauguin. General Lafayette was appointed commander of the National Guard. On 31 July 1830 the Municipal Commission named the ministers, called provisional commissioners, of the Paris Municipal Commission Ministry.
