= Guillaume-Xavier Labbey de Pompières =

French politician

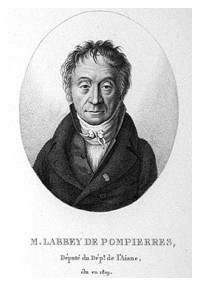
- Born: 3 May 1751; Besançon, Doubs, France
- Died: 14 May 1831 (aged 80); Paris, France
- Occupation: Politician

Guillaume-Xavier Labbey de Pompières (3 May 1751 – 14 May 1831) was a French politician. He was a deputy in the Legislative Assembly from 1813 to 1815, a representative in the Chamber during the Hundred Days and a deputy from 1819 to 1831.

== Early years ==
Guillaume-Xavier Labbey de Pompières was born into a noble family in Besançon, Doubs, on 3 May 1751. He was the son of Jacques-François-Joseph Labbey, an advocate, and Étiennette-Marie Roux. He joined the army, and before the French Revolution gained the rank of captain in the artillery. He retired in 1789 after 27 years of service.

At first Labbey de Pompières supported the revolutionary ideas, but became frightened of what was happening, became a suspect, and in 1793 was imprisoned. He was released after eighteen months of detention, and became a member and president of the district of Saint-Quentin. Under the First French Empire he was appointed a counselor to the prefecture of the Aisne department. He was made interim prefect in 1812. On 6 January 1813 he was appointed by the Senate as deputy for Aisne in the legislative body. He was an opponent of imperial despotism, and voted for printing the report by Joseph Lainé on the political situation in France after the French defeat in the Battle of Leipzig (16–19 October 1813).

Labbey de Pompières supported the first Bourbon Restoration, and helped the dynasty return after the fall of Napoleon in 1814. He was made a knight of the Legion of Honour on 13 December 1814. In the 1814 session he belonged to the opposition to the Bourbon prime minister. He was against the proposed laws to control the press. Speaking on the subject of restoring the goods of émigrés that had not been sold, he proposed to place all the property in the hands of King Louis XVIII to distribute as he saw fit.

During the Hundred Days (20 March to 8 July 1815) when Napoleon returned from exile, Labbey de Pompierres was elected on 8 May 1815 to represent the department of Aisne in the Chamber. He was appointed one of the five inspecteurs de la salle. He did not speak during the short term of this Legislature.

== Bourbon Restoration ==
As a constitutional monarchist, Labbey de Pompières remained in retirement for a few years after the second Bourbon Restoration. He was elected to represent the Aisne on 11 September 1819. He sat on the left with the liberal opposition, and despite his age played a very active part in the debates. It was said that he was almost twice the age of eligibility for a deputy, and made as much noise as four or five. He voted against the emergency laws, the new electoral system and violations of the Charter of 1814. On 6 March 1820 he proposed a reform of the electoral system to reduce the opportunities for fraud, but this was rejected. He spoke against the censorship law and proposed many amendments to the budget to reduce expenditures. In the 1822 session he again attacked the press laws. He opposed the war in Spain.

On 6 March 1824 Labbey de Pompières failed to be reelected for the college district of Aisne, but on 2 August 1824 was elected for the Saint-Quentin electoral district of Aisne. He continued to speak out against abuses. He was reelected on 17 November 1827. His position was that the previous ministers had isolated the king from the people. He was hostile to the Martignac ministry, and helped secure its downfall. He led the first session of the Chamber in 1830 as the oldest member. He was one of the 221 deputies who voted in March 1830 for an address hostile to the Ministry of Jules de Polignac, which led to the dissolution of the chamber.

== July Revolution ==
Labbey de Pompières was reelected on 23 June 1830. The Ordinances of 25 July 1830 suspended the constitution. Paris was calm the next day, although there were stirrings of protest against the blows the ordinances had dealt against the powers of the legislators and the press. On 27 July 1831 the deputies present in Paris met at the house of Labbey de Pompières as the oldest member. They moved on to Casimir Pierre Périer's, but although they made speeches and were urged to act by Pierre-François Audry de Puyraveau, François Mauguin and Labbey de Pompières, they were unwilling to launch a protest. Labbey de Pompierres continued to agitate in different places in Paris during the July Revolution, and worked with all his power for the accession of Louis-Philippe.

Labbey de Pompières thought that the abuses that he had fought would be swept away, and France would enter a new era. He was mistaken, as was his friend Benjamin Constant. The new government's policies did not live up to Labbey de Pompières's liberal ideals. He left the majority, refused the post of Quaestor that was offered to him, and ceased to appear in meetings of the Chamber. Labbey de Pompières died in Paris on 14 May 1831. He is buried in Père Lachaise Cemetery, Paris. He left one daughter. His granddaughter married Odilon Barrot.
