= Pierre-François Audry de Puyraveau =

French politician (1773–1852)

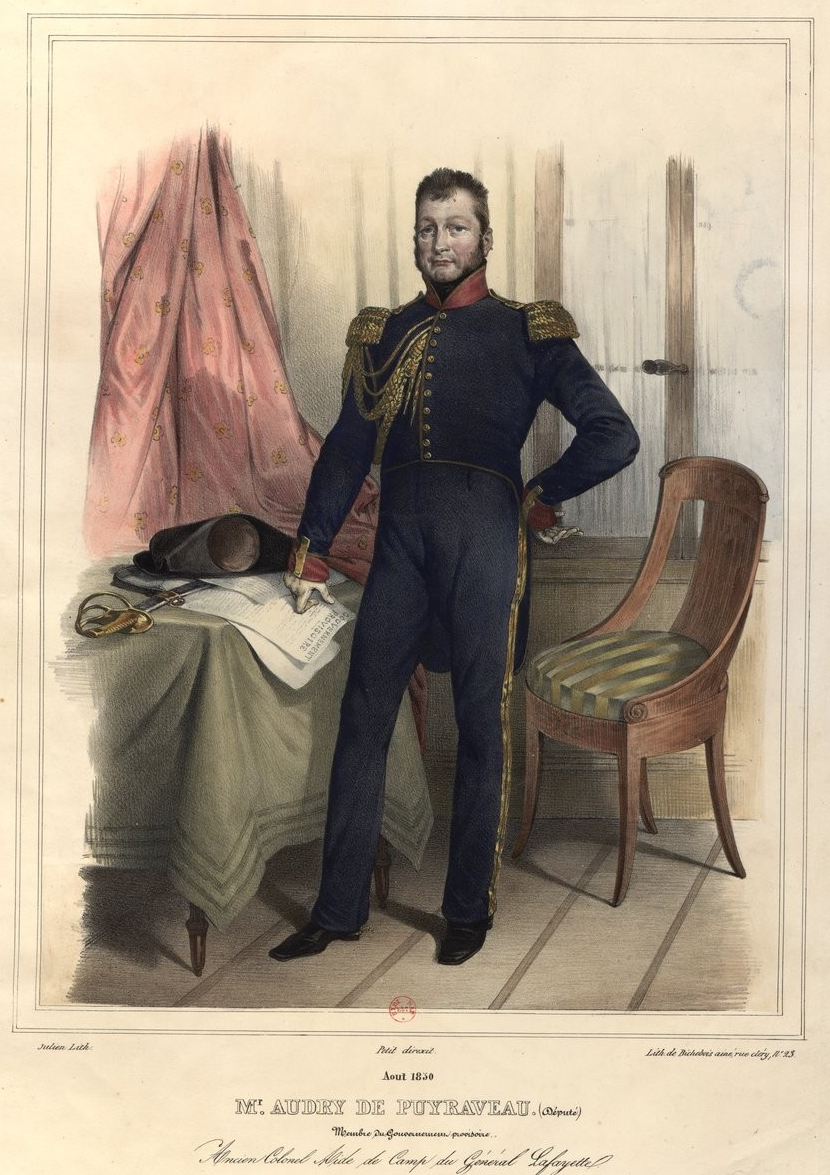
- Born: 27 September 1773; Puyravault, Charente-Maritime, France
- Died: 6 December 1852 (aged 79); Maisons-Laffitte, Seine-et-Oise, France
- Occupation: Politician
- Known for: Leader of the July Revolution

Pierre-François Audry, called Audry de Puyraveau (27 September 1773 - 6 December 1852) was a French politician. He was a deputy during the Bourbon Restoration. He played a key role in the July Revolution, and was a deputy during the July Monarchy. In his old age he was a Representative in the Constituent Assembly after the Revolution of 1848.

== Early years ==
Pierre-François Audry was born in Puyravault, Charente-Maritime, on 27 September 1773. (Note: Another source gives Audry's birthdate as 3 September 1783. The date of 27 September 1773 seems more plausible given his status as oldest member of the Assembly in 1848.) He was the son of Pierre Audry, merchant, and his wife Françoise Rondeau. Audry became a member of the French Carbonari, an underground movement hostile to the Bourbon Restoration.

Audry, described as a propriétaire of Rochefort, was elected deputy on 28 January 1822 for the 2nd electoral district of Charente-Inférieure (Rochefort). In 1822 he founded a large rolling factory in Paris. He was reelected for Rochefort on 17 November 1827. He was an opponent of the Restoration government, and on 16 March 1830 was one of the 221 deputies who voted for an address that was hostile to the Ministry of Jules de Polignac, which led to the dissolution of the house. Audry was reelected on 23 June 1830.

== July Revolution ==
The Ordinances of 25 July 1830 suspended the constitution. Paris was calm on 26 July, although there were stirrings of protest against the blows the ordinances had dealt against the powers of the legislators and the press. Most of the deputies in Paris met at Casimir Pierre Périer's house on 27 July, but although they made speeches and were urged to act by Audry de Puyraveau, François Mauguin and Labbey de Pompières, they were unwilling to launch a protest. In a meeting held in the home of Jacques Laffitte on 27 July, while others procrastinated for fear or respect for the rule of law, Audry was among the five or six deputies who decided to fight.

Audry, at that time a rich and powerful man, invited the deputies from the Left to meet in his house beside his rolling factory on 28 July. When they arrived they found the courtyard filled with students and workers whom he had called to stir up his guests. The meeting was in a ground floor room, with the windows open, in full view of the crowd in the courtyard. Mauguin demanded the formation of a provisional government, but the deputies could not agree on a protest that François Guizot had written, which said only that the advisers of the king had deceived his intentions.

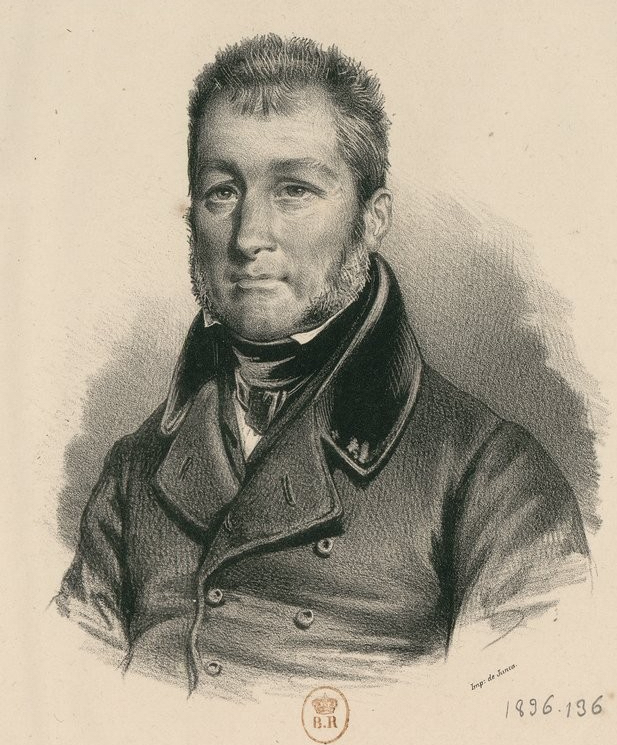
Audry de Puyraveau in 1836

Seeing the indecisiveness of the deputies, Audry had a notice printed and displayed during the night that named General Lafayette as commander of the National Guard, and himself as the General's aide-de-camp. The next day, 29 July, he went to inform the general of his nomination. When the general hesitated, he managed to persuade him to come with him to the Laffite's house, where the deputies were meeting. Carbonnel and Audry then went with the old general to the Hôtel de Ville, where he was welcomed and installed in command.

Meantime the deputies at Lafitte's house named an interim Municipal Commission composed of Laffitte, Périer, Georges Mouton, Auguste de Schonen, Audry de Puyraveau and Mauguin. General Lafayette was confirmed as commander of the National Guard According to Audry, it was he who refused to negotiate with the envoys of King Charles X of France. He spent a considerable amount of his fortune during the revolution. He was deeply indignant at the establishment of Louis Philippe as Lieutenant General of France on 31 July 1830. On 2 August 1830 Charles X of France formally abdicated, and on 9 August 1830 Louis Philippe took the oath of office as King.

== July Monarchy ==
In the elections of 5 July 1831 Audry was reelected for Rochefort, Charente-Maritime. In September 1831 Audry de Puyraveau was among the deputies who declared themselves against a hereditary peerage. The Orleanist outcome of the July Revolution had only partly satisfied him, and in 1832 he was a member of the steering committee that founded the Society of the Rights of Man (Société des droits de l'homme) intended to maintain the revolutionary spirit. In the general election of 21 June 1834 Audry lost his seat to Vice Admiral Grivel, but the election was annulled. In a re-run on 20 September 1834 Audry defeated Grivel and was returned as deputy for Rochefort.

At the trial before the House of Peers of those accused of the April 1834 Canut Revolt in Lyon, Audry was one of their defenders. In May 1835 he signed an address to the accused that ended with the words "the infamy of the judge will be the glory of the accused. For this action the chamber of deputies authorized proceedings against Audry. He refused to appear before the House of Peers, and was not concerned since Michel de Bourges and Ulysse Trélat, co-signatories, had assumed full responsibility. He was condemned by the Peers to a month in prison and a fine of 200 francs, and was arrested at his house. After serving his term of imprisonment he returned to the Assembly, where he was applauded by his friends.

Audry failed to be reelected on 30 October 1837 after the dissolution obtained by the second cabinet of Louis Mathieu Molé. His political activities had severely damaged his finances, and he withdrew from public life.

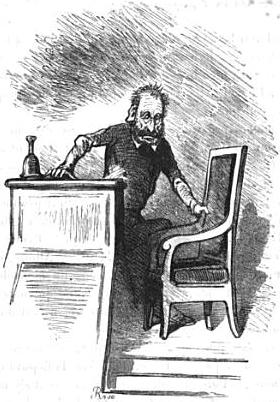
1850 Caricature of Audry de Puyraveau by Cham

== Last years ==
Audry de Puyravault appeared again on the political scene after the February Revolution of 1848. On 23 April 1848 he was elected as Representative for Charente-Inférieure in the Constituent Assembly. As the oldest member, he presided over the first meeting of the Assembly on 4 May 1848 until the election of Philippe Buchez. He died in Maisons-Laffitte, Seine-et-Oise, on 6 December 1852.

A passport dated 15 April 1831 describes Audry as 57 years old, height 5.45 feet (1.66 m), gray hair, high forehead, brown eyebrows, gray-blue eyes, large nose, average mouth, chestnut beard, dimpled chin, round face, dark complexion, resident in Paris at 8 rue de Valois. A contemporary said that if the hôtel Laffitte was the cradle of the revolution, Audry's establishment was where it broke free of its swaddling clothes and sprang to victory at the Hôtel-de-Ville and the throne of Charles X.

== Works ==
Various letters and speeches have been preserved. Audry is co-signatory of a report to the king on the events of 27–29 July 1830:

- Lobau, Audry de Puyraveau; de Schonen, Mauguin. (1830). Rapport de la commission municipale au roi, sur les 27, 28 et 29 juillet. Paris: Bureau du "Journal des ouvriers".

== Sources ==
- Alhoy, Philadelphe Maurice (1848). Biographie parlementaire des représentants du peuple à l'Assemblée nationale constituante de 1848.
- Blanc, Jean Joseph Louis (1844). The history of ten years, 1830-1840 (translated).
- Lesaulnier, C. M. (1848). Biographie des neuf cents deputés à l'Assemblee nationale: par ordre alphabetique de departements; tant de ceux qui ont été élus le 23 avril, aux elections generales, que de ceux qui ont été nommes le 4 juin aux elections complementaires... Bureaux de la rédaction.
- Muel, Léon (1891). Gouvernements, ministères et constitutions de la France depuis cent ans: Précis historique des révolutions, des crises ministérielles et gouvernementales, et des changements de constitutions de la France depuis 1789 jusqu'en 1890 ... Marchal et Billard.
- "Pierre-François Audry de Puyravault (1773-1852) - Auteur du texte". BNF.
- Robert, Adolphe; Couchy, Gaston (1891). "AUDRY DE PUYRAVAULT (Pierre-François)". Dictionnaire des Parlementaires Français comprenant tous les membres des Assemblées Françaises et tous les Ministres Français depuis le 1er mai 1789 jusqu'au 1er mai 1889 (PDF). Vol. 1. Bourloton.
- Spitzer, Alan Barrie (1971-01-01). Old Hatreds and Young Hopes: The French Carbonari Against the Bourbon Restoration. Harvard University Press. ISBN 978-0-674-63220-2.
- Sarrut, Germain; Bourg, Edme Théodore (1836). Biographie des hommes du jour: industriels, conseillers-d'état, artistes, chambellans, députés, prêtres, militaires, écrivains, rois, diplomates, ... H. Krabe.
- Wood, John Cunningham (1991). John Stuart Mill: Critical Assessments. Taylor & Francis. ISBN 978-0-415-06945-8.
