= Pierre Barthélemy =

Pierre Barthélemy, Pierre-Barthélemy, Pierre Barthélémy, or Pierre-Barthélémy may refer to the following people:

- Peter Bartholomew (known in French as Pierre Barthélemy; died 1099), French soldier and mystic
- Pierre-Barthélemy Gheusi (1865–1943), French theatre director, librettist, journalist, and writer
- Pierre-Barthélémy Portal d'Albarèdes (1765–1845), French politician
- Pierre Laurent Barthélemy François Charles de Saint-Cricq (more commonly known as Pierre de Saint-Cricq; 1772–1854), French politician
- Pierre Marie Barthélemy Ferino (1747–1816), French politician and general
