= François-Jean-Hyacinthe Feutrier =

French Catholic priest

- Bishop of Beauvais
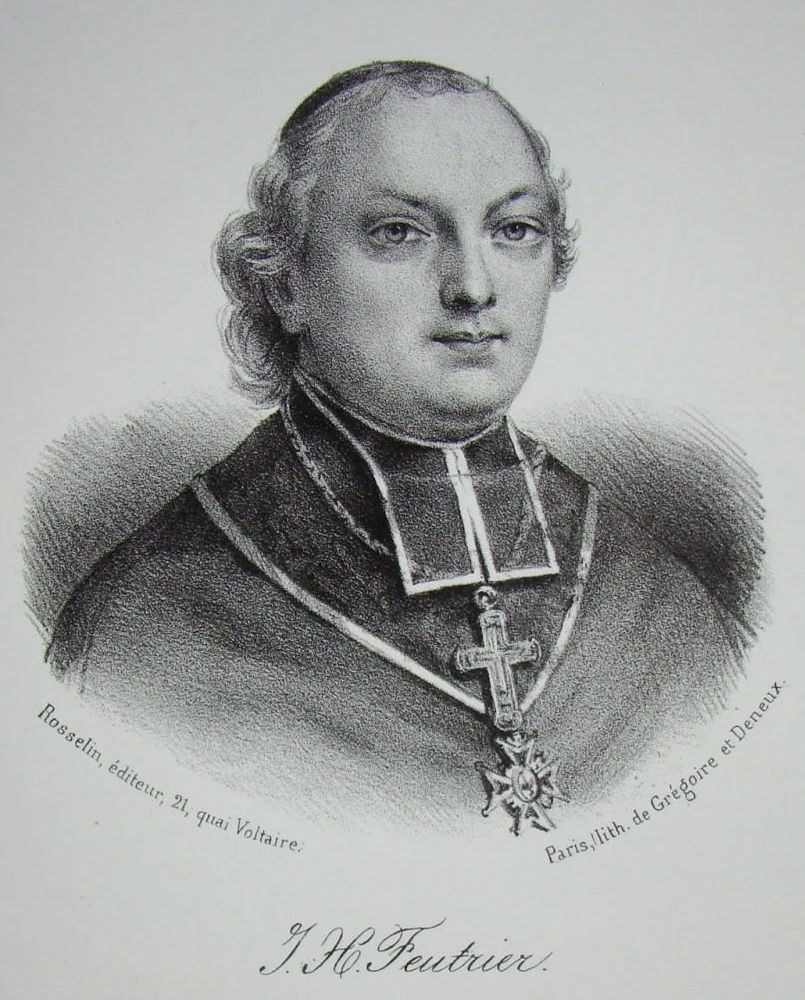
- Archdiocese: Reims
- Diocese: Roman Catholic Diocese of Beauvais
- Installed: 21 March 1825
- Term ended: 27 June 1830
- Predecessor: Claude-Louis de Lesquen
- Successor: Jean-Louis-Simon Lemercier

Orders
- Ordination: 27 May 1809
- Consecration: 24 April 1825 by Hyacinthe-Louis de Quélen, Archbishop of Paris

Personal details
- Born: 3 April 1785 Paris, France
- Died: 27 June 1830 (aged 45) Paris
- Buried: Beauvais Cathedral
- Denomination: Catholic

François-Jean-Hyacinthe Feutrier (3 April 1785 – 27 June 1830) was a French Catholic priest who became Bishop of Beauvais. He was Minister of Religious Affairs from 3 March to 8 August 1829. He caused a storm of protest from the other bishops in France when he signed an ordinance aimed at restricting the influence of the church in schools.

== Early years ==
François-Hyacinthe-Jean Feutrier was born in Paris on 3 April 1785. He studied at the seminary of Saint-Sulpice under Abbé Emery, and embraced a career in the church. He was ordained a priest on 27 May 1809. Feutrier was named secretary-general of the high chaplaincy by Cardinal Joseph Fesch. The cardinal also helped him to become a member of the council convoked in Paris by Napoleon to settle disputes between the French government and Pope Pius VII. He contributed to that council's resistance to the emperor's wishes.

After the first Bourbon Restoration, Archbishop Talleyrand-Périgord of Reims, high chaplain of France, sponsored Feutrier, whose position in the high chaplaincy was confirmed by King Louis XVIII. Feutrier left during the Hundred Days when Napoleon returned from exile, despite the assurances of Cardinal Fesch, then was re-installed after the return of the king. He was soon made honorary canon of the royal chapel of Saint-Denis, then curé of La Madeleine, Paris. In this position he demonstrated piety, charity and great energy. His sermons were remarkable. On 8 May 1821 he pronounced the panegyric on Joan of Arc in Orléans Cathedral.

In February 1823 Feutrier was named vicar-general of the diocese of Paris and a member of the diocese council of the Archbishop, Mgr. Hyacinthe-Louis de Quélen. He was selected Bishop of Beauvais on 26 January 1825, confirmed as bishop on 21 March 1825 and ordained on 24 April 1825 by Hyacinthe-Louis de Quélen, Archbishop of Paris.

== Minister ==
Mgr Denis-Luc Frayssinous, who had been Minister of Public Education and Religious Affairs in the Ministry of Jean-Baptiste de Martignac, was dismissed in 1828. A layman, Antoine Lefebvre de Vatimesnil, was given the Ministry of Public Education. Feutrier was appointed Minister of Ecclesiastical Affairs on 3 March 1828.

On 16 June 1828 two ordinances by King Charles X of France were issued, one countersigned by Joseph-Marie, comte Portalis and the other by Feutrier. The first, intended to reduce the influence of the church in education, limited the number of pupils in ecclesiastic schools to 20,000, and obliged the pupils to start wearing the clerical habit after two years since the schools were considered junior seminaries. The other ordinance required all teachers to sign a document in which they declared that they did not belong to any unauthorized religious congregation. This was mainly aimed at the Jesuits. The bishops reacted angrily and Feutrier was denounced as a traitor. The bishops, headed by Clermont-Tonerre, addressed a memorandum of protest to the king. Charles X had to ask Pope Leo XII to intervene to calm things down.

Feutrier left office on 8 August 1829 when the Martignac ministry was dismissed. He was given the title of Count and made a peer of France. He was a member of the Legion of Honor. His health gradually deteriorated, and he visited Paris to consult with doctors. Feutrier was found dead in his bed there on 27 June 1830, aged forty-five. An autopsy found the cause was an effusion on the brain.

== Works ==
- Panégyrique de Jeanne d'Arc (pronounced in the Orléans Cathedral on 8 May 1821, on the anniversary of the delivery of Orléans
- Oraison funèbre du duc de Berry (1820)
- Oraison funèbre de la duchesse d'Orléans (1821).

== Sources ==
- Cheney, David M. (21 August 2013). "Bishop François-Hyacinthe-Jean Feutrier". Catholic Hierarchy.
- Feller, François-Xavier; Pérennès, François Marie; Pérennès, Jean Baptiste (1834). Biographie universelle, ou Dictionnaire historique des hommes qui se sont fait un nom par leur génie, leurs talents, leurs vertus, leurs erreurs ou leurs crimes. Gauthier.
- Julg, Jean (2004). Les évêques dans l'histoire de la France: des origines à nos jours. P. Téqui. ISBN 978-2-7403-1135-6.
- Kerr, Donal (2010-06-01). Jean-Claude Colin Mariste. Un fondateur dans une ère de révolution et de restauration : les premières années 1790-1836. KARTHALA Editions. ISBN 978-2-8111-3289-7.
- Muel, Léon (1891). Gouvernements, ministères et constitutions de la France depuis cent ans: Précis historique des révolutions, des crises ministérielles et gouvernementales, et des changements de constitutions de la France depuis 1789 jusqu'en 1890 ... Marchal et Billard.
- Rohrbacher, René François; Fèvre, Justin Louis Pierre (1889). Histoire universelle de l'église catholique. L. Vivés.
