= Guillaume Capelle =

French administrator and politician

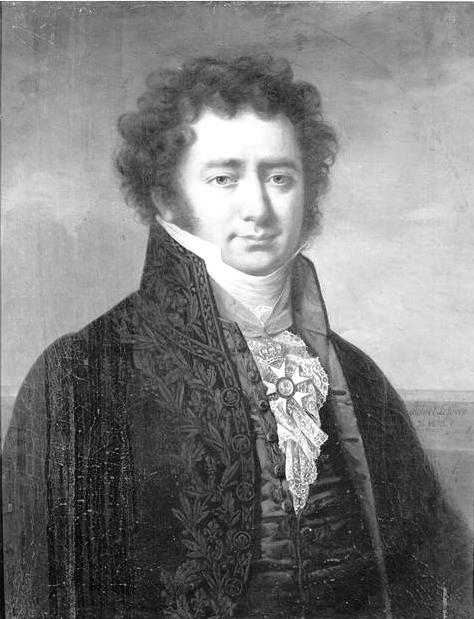
- Capelle in 1812 by Robert Lefèvre
- Born: 9 September 1775; Salles-Curan, Rouergue, (today Aveyron), France
- Died: 25 October 1843 (aged 68); Montpellier, Hérault, France
- Occupation: Politician

Guillaume-Antoine-Benoît, baron Capelle (9 September 1775 – 25 October 1843) was a French administrator and politician. He served under Napoleon and under the Bourbon Restoration. In 1830 he was briefly Minister of Public Works on the eve of the July Revolution.

== Early years ==
Guillaume-Antoine-Benoît Capelle was born on 9 September 1775 in Salles-Curan, then in Rouergue and today in Aveyron, to a family of judges. From his youth he was an enthusiastic supporter of the French Revolution. At the age of 15 he represented the district of Millau in the 14 July 1790 Fête de la Fédération. At the age of 18 he was appointed a lieutenant in the 2nd grenadier battalion of the Pyrénées-Orientales. He served in that grade until 1794, when he was dismissed as a federalist and returned to Millau.

Capelle was briefly an itinerant actor, before marrying and becoming the commander of the National Guard of Millau. After the coup of 18 Brumaire (9 November 1799) he was sent as a delegate to Paris by his fellow citizens to congratulate the consular government. With the sponsorship of Jean-Antoine Chaptal he entered the Ministry of Interior in 1800.

== First Empire ==
Capelle was appointed Secretary General of the department of Alpes-Maritimes at the end of 1800, then of the Department of Stura in 1805. On 25 February 1808 he was appointed prefect of the department of the Mediterranean with its capital in Livorno. This was a difficult position. The prefecture bordered the states of the Elisa Bonaparte, the Princess of Lucca and Piombino, who was extremely jealous of his authority. Capelle was able to obtain the favor of the princess, and the most perfect understanding existed between them.

This intimacy with his sister displeased the Emperor, who moved Capelle to the position of prefect of Geneva on 30 November 1810. Capelle did not find it easy to get the citizens to accept him. Allied troops arrived at the undefended city of Geneva at the end of 1813 and forced it to surrender. Napoleon had Capelle thrown in prison despite his being exonerated by a commission of inquiry.

== Bourbon Restoration ==
After the first Bourbon Restoration, on 10 June 1814 Capelle accepted the position of Prefect of Ain from King Louis XVIII. The Count of Artois gave him the Officer's Cross of the Legion of Honor. When Napoleon returned, Capelle went to Ghent during the Hundred Days. He returned to France with the second Restoration. He was made prefect of Doubs, and soon after was appointed councilor of state. In 1822 he was made Secretary General of the Ministry of the Interior. In 1828 he was appointed prefect of Seine-et-Oise.

On 19 May 1830 Capelle joined the Ministry of Jules de Polignac as head of the newly created Ministry of Public Works. His first task was to prepare for new elections after the 16 May 1830 dissolution of the Chamber of Deputies. On 25 July 1830 Capelle signed the reactionary July Ordinances. Three days later, when the July Revolution broke out, he fled with his colleagues and took refuge in England. He was tried in absentia before the Court of Peers and sentenced to life imprisonment, confiscation of property and the loss of all his titles.

In 1836 Capelle received a Royal pardon and returned to France where he lived in retirement. He died on 25 October 1843 in Montpellier, Hérault.
