= Guillaume-Isidore Baron de Montbel =

French politician

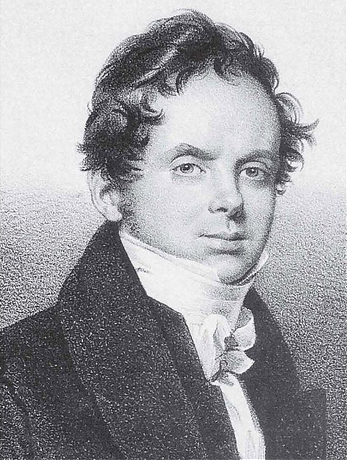
- Lithograph after a portrait by Daffinger
- Born: 4 July 1787; Toulouse, Haute-Garonne, France
- Died: 3 February 1861 (aged 73); Schloss Frohsdorf, Austria
- Known for: Minister of Finance

Guillaume-Isidore Baron de Montbel (4 July 1787 – 3 February 1861) was a French politician who was a mayor of Toulouse, a deputy and a minister in the French government during the last year of the Bourbon Restoration. He was an ardent royalist and opposed to the freedom of press. After the July Revolution of 1830 he was tried in absentia and sentenced to civil death. He was later pardoned and returned to France.

== Early years ==
Guillaume-Isidore de Montbel was born in Toulouse, Haute-Garonne, on 4 July 1787. His grandfather, Jean Baron de Montbel, had been Treasurer of France. His parents were Jean-Louis Baron de Montbel (1727–1793) and Catherine-Rosalie de Reynal (1766–1843). His father was a councilor at the parliament of Toulouse in 1753 and a king's advocate from 1777 to 1791. His father was executed in the French Revolution.

Montbel was a fervent royalist. He enlisted in the Royal Volunteers in 1815. During the Hundred Days of Napoleon's return to power he was placed under police supervision. He was a property owner in Toulouse, a councilor of that city, and was appointed mayor by the restored Bourbon regime, replacing his close friend Jean-Baptiste de Villèle. On 17 November 1827 Montbel was elected deputy for the second district of Haute-Garonne.

As a deputy Montbel was active and zealous, devoted to the monarchy and a fluent speaker. He defended the views of Villèle in matters of policy and finance, presented many proposals and amendments, and was a tireless opponent of the Liberals. He was appointed to the committee to examine the proposed law on periodicals, and showed himself hostile to the freedom of the press, for which he blamed the assassination by Louis Pierre Louvel of Charles Ferdinand, Duke of Berry. He was the candidate of the extreme right for vice-speaker of the chamber in 1829, but only received 62 votes. On 7 April 1829 he criticized as wasteful and romantic the French intervention on behalf of the Greeks, who were seeking independence.

== Minister ==
Montbel was Minister of Religious Affairs and Public Education from 8 August 1829 to 18 November 1829. In this position he continued the tolerant policy of Antoine Lefebvre de Vatimesnil and rejected the demands of the Ultras to suspend the courses of Victor Cousin and François Guizot. He was appointed Minister of the Interior on 18 November 1829 after the resignation of Labourdonnaye, at the personal desire of King Charles X. He placed Sirieys Mayrinhac in charge of the general police. He spoke several times in the Chamber, trying in vain to overcome the unpopularity of the ministerial cabinet. He played an active role in the discussion of 5 March 1830 over the Royal Address, fighting the attacks of the constitutional party. He was then Minister of Finance from 19 May 1830 until 29 July 1830 in the last days of the Bourbon Restoration. He signed the July Ordinances which inadvertently led to the July Revolution and the end of the Bourbon dynasty.

== Later career ==
Montbel accompanied the king to Rambouillet. After the Duke of Orleans had been appointed lieutenant-general of the kingdom, he returned to Paris and then went to Vienna, Austria. He was included in the trial of ministers of Charles X of France and on 28 September 1830 was sentenced in absentia to civil death and life imprisonment. A central charge was that he had taken 421,000 francs on 28 July to supply the royalist troops during the height of the struggle.

Montbel was granted an amnesty by the Molé ministry in 1837. He returned to France, but stayed away from public affairs for the rest of his life. He died in Schloss Frohsdorf, Austria, on 3 February 1861, while visiting Henri, Count of Chambord, the legitimist pretender.

== Bibliography ==
After leaving public life, Montbel published a number of works with monarchist themes:

- Protestation de M. de Montbel, ex-ministre du roi de France, contre la procédure instruite et suivie contre lui devant les pairs, convoqués en cour de justice, et Exposé de sa conduite pendant et avant les évènemens de juillet 1830. Paris: P., Dentu. 1831. p. 31.
- Lettre sur le choléra de Vienne. Revue des Deux Mondes. 1832.
- Le duc de Reichstadt, notice sur la vie et la mort de ce prince, rédigée à Vienne sur des documents authentiques. Paris: Le Normant. 1832.
- Dernière époque de l’histoire de Charles X, ses derniers voyages, sa maladie, sa mort, ses funérailles, son caractère et ses habitudes dans l’exil, s.d.
- Montbel, Guillaume-Isidore de (1844). Le comte de Marnes, fils aîné du roi de France Charles X. p. 156.

Republished in 1845 with the title:
Le duc d'Angoulême, dauphin, comte de Marnes, fils aîné du roi de France Charles X. Paris: Dentu. 1845.

His grandson published a posthumous collection of writings:

- Guy de Montbel, ed. (1913). 1787-1861, Souvenirs du comte de Montbel. Paris. p. 436.
