= Press freedom under the Restoration =

Press freedom in France during the Bourbon Restoration

Press freedom under the Restoration was set against the backdrop of the Second White Terror that surrounded the early days of the Bourbon Restoration. Freedom of the press, which had been censored by the previous regimes, fluctuated with the legal oscillations orchestrated by the various ministries that succeeded one another during the regime.

== Early royalist and imperial ministries (May 1814-December 1818) ==
=== Charter of 1814 ===
Louis XVIII's constitutional charter re-established freedom of the press in line with revolutionary demands. The article 8 of the charter, according to the will of the people, allowed the right to publish and print while respecting every opinion.

In the same year, however, Louis XVIII and the royalist government restricted the power of the press with a series of laws dated October 21, 1814, re-establishing a number of controls such as prior authorization, censorship (less restrictive than the censorship introduced under the Empire) and tight control of printing works and bookshops. They also declared correctional courts competent to judge press offenses. Another restriction was introduced a year later, at the instigation of the Minister of Police, who proposed that censorship be maintained until January 1, 1818. Voted on in February 1817, this extension, after fierce discussion between the parties, was only retained in the form of a separate law on freedom of the press. Another law, however, abandoned by the 2 Chambers, aimed to establish conditions for the publication of books and newspapers (concerning only the non-periodical press), and to define the jurisdiction competent to judge these offenses.

=== Softening of restrictions ===
Ideas germinated after the establishment of the 1814 Charter. In 1817, for example, Royer-Collard (leader of the Moderate party) supported the idea, from the rostrum of the Chamber of Deputies, that press offenses should no longer be judged by correctional courts, but by assize courts, and therefore by popular juries. The moderates of the early 19th century argued that the French press was a "necessary principle" for the smooth functioning of current politics, exerting a considerable influence on public opinion, but also indispensable to the maintenance of a government.

== Dessoles ministry (December 1818-February 1820) ==
=== Serre law ===
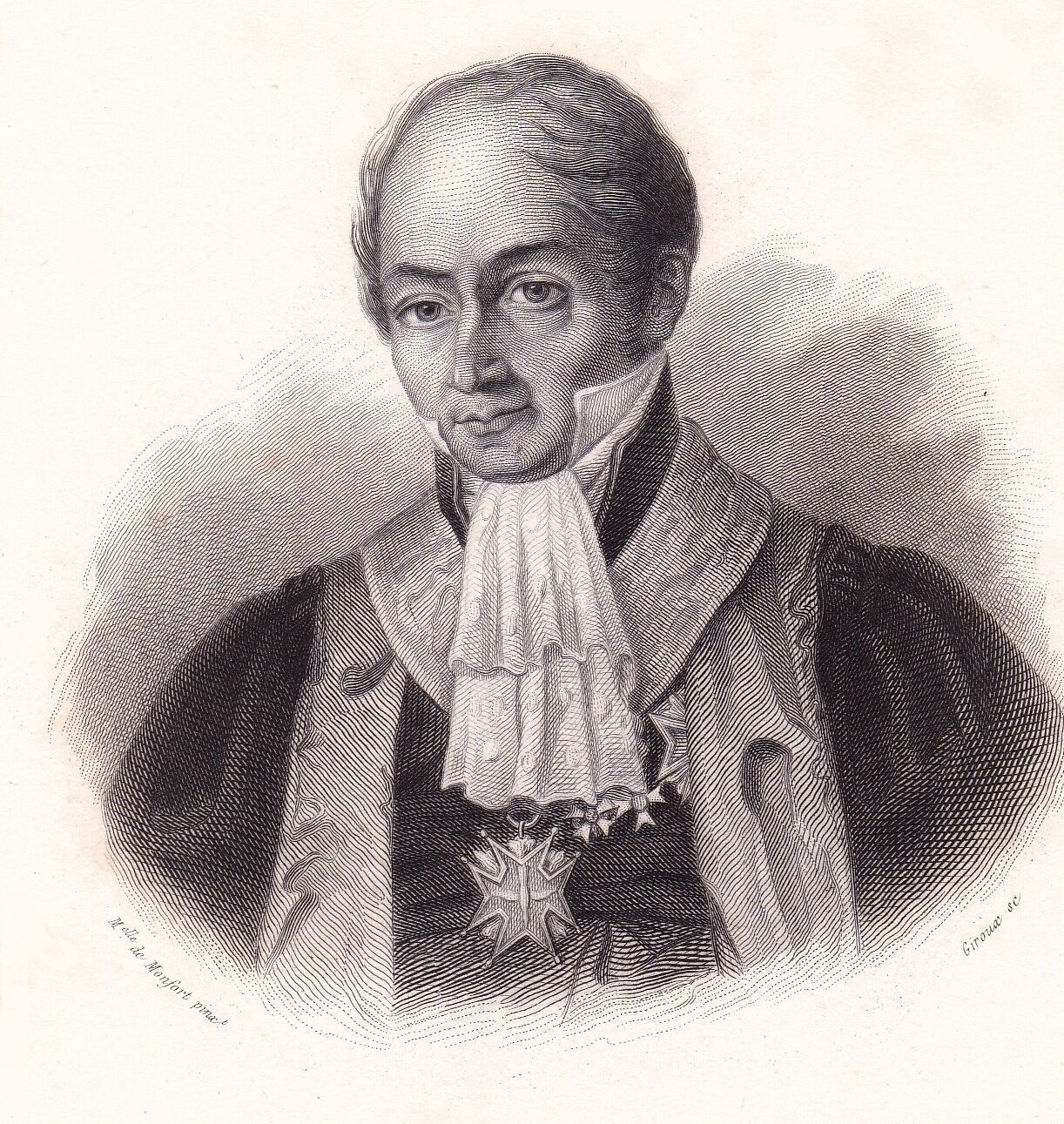
Hercule, count of Serre (1776 -1824)

Under the Dessoles ministry, and under the influence of the Garde des Sceaux, Hercule de Serre, a series of laws were passed to establish a liberal and controlled press freedom in line with the demands of 1789. The laws were proclaimed in April-May 1819, with a view to both liberalization and censorship.

The first innovation, and one of the most important, was a clear definition of the types of offence to which the press could be subject, grouped into 4 distinct categories:

- offence to the royal person; the king could not be directly attacked.
- public provocation of crimes and offenses
- outrage against public morality or morals.
- defamation and public insult.

The final innovation of the Serre laws concerns the judicial translation of a newspaper before the court. Serre decided to replace appearances before the criminal court with popular assent, and thus appearances before a jury. For de Serre: attacks on society are to be judged by society itself, thus pronouncing a form of legal power in the hands of the French people.

== Second Richelieu ministry (February 1820-December 1821) ==
=== Censorship supremacy ===
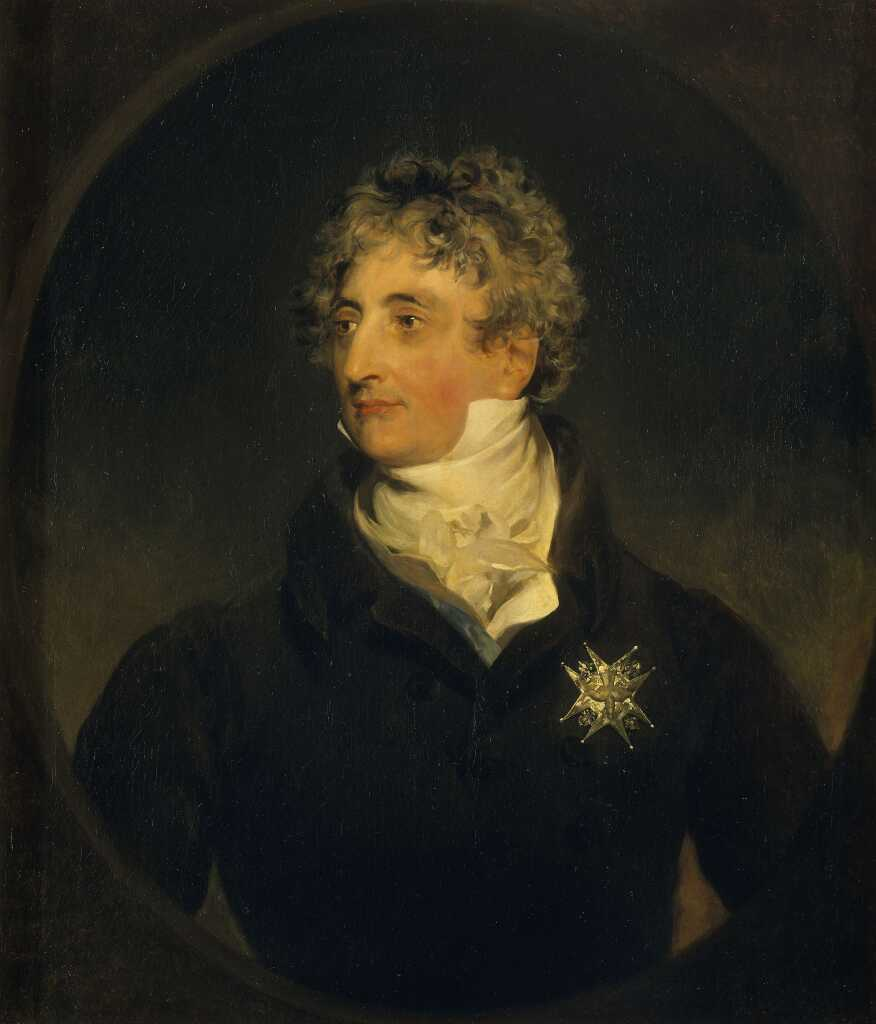
Armand-Emmanuel du Plessis de Richelieu (1766 -1822)

The assassination of the Duke of Berry by Louis Pierre Louvel on February 13, 1820 led to a gradual decline in press freedom. The Ultra-royalists, followed by the moderates, decided to join forces with the aim of muzzling the liberal doctrines deemed responsible for the Duke of Berry's death and thus destroying this fanaticism at its very roots, forcing Élie Decazes to resign on February 20, 1820 in favor of the moderate Richelieu. On February 28, 1820, the Ultras in power, with a majority thanks to the moderates, passed the laws of exception by 136 votes to 74, considerably reducing the power of the press through the use of censorship. The law was passed on March 30, 1820, by 136 votes to 109.

- This new law instituted new methods of press control with :
- insertion of royal authorization (art 2).
- prior examination of manuscripts (art 4), punishable by 1 to 6 months' imprisonment and a fine of 200 to 1,200 francs for non-compliance (art 5).
- the right to suspend the government of the deposed newspaper until judgment (art 6), as well as an extension, if necessary, of 6 months pending a new judgment.
- a suspension which may be definitive in the event of a repeat offence (art 7).

A royal decree of April 1, 1820 completed the March 30 law by establishing a Censorship Commission in Paris, comprising 12 members, each appointed by the King on presentation by the Minister of the Interior (art 4-5). The départements were also subject to this control by Censorship Commissions composed of 3 members sitting in their chief towns (art 8). The role of the Commission de Censure was to become a court of law, under the control of the Ministry, capable of modifying or deleting pamphlets, sentences or even words deemed illegal, as well as suspending a newspaper for a set period and imposing fines and prison sentences leading to the closure of newspapers.

=== Authoritarian application ===
On April 4, 1820, censorship was introduced for all French newspapers. The main aim of the Commissions, under royal and ministerial directives, was to repress liberal newspapers.

As soon as it came into force, leading doctrinaire periodicals such as La Bibliothèque historique, La Minerve (liberal) and Le Conservateur (royalist and religious) had to give up, rejected by the new censorship regime.

=== Censorship collapse ===
The collapse of censorship is simply a backlash. The Ultras, who jointly participated in the elaboration of this censorship, will see their own weapons turned against them. The government, faced with the distrust of the royalist party, who confronted it daily and abruptly, used the Commission de Censure to punish royalist newspapers, such as Le Régulateur, which eventually went bankrupt due to the many condemnations it had received.

On June 9, 1821, Interior Minister Siméon proposed to the Chamber a one-year extension of the censorship law, which was due to expire with the parliamentary session. The text was rejected by all the ministers, and the Commission categorically refused to adopt it.

After lengthy discussions within the parties on the future of press repression, the Ultras conceded to Josse-Beauvoir and Courtarvel's amendment, which limited the application of censorship to the third month following the opening of the 1821 session. The law was passed by 214 votes to 112.

On December 3, 1821, Richelieu undertook a further easing of restrictions on freedom of the press by abolishing misdemeanors, in line with the principles of the Serre laws, which were simply more restrictive. But it also established censorship for a period of 5 years. This horrified the Right, who protested violently against the proposal, leading to Richelieu's resignation on December 12, 1821. The Garde des Sceaux announced the withdrawal of Richelieu's restrictive plans for press freedom.

== Villèle ministry (December 1821-January 1828) ==
=== Overhaul of press freedoms ===
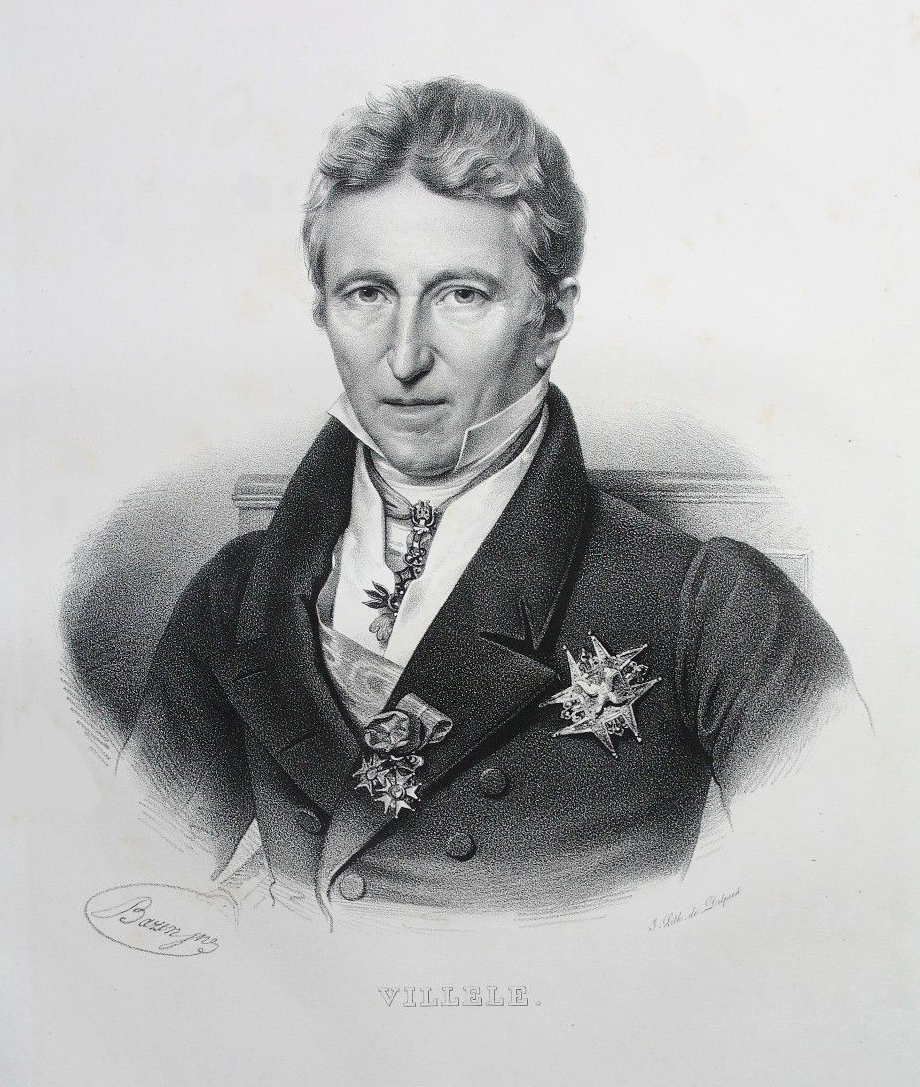
Joseph, count of Villèle (1773 -1854)

Villèle's government was once again subject to the Serre laws of 1819. His motivation was to control the French press indirectly, by legally censoring it. On January 2, 1822, he introduced a law to punish press offenses, supplemented by another law on newspaper policing. These laws created a new type of offence known as "délits de tendance" (offences of tendency), which made it possible to convict a newspaper whose spirit and tendency were such as to undermine public peace, the respect due to the State religion and other legally recognized religions, the authority of the king and the profitability of constitutional institutions. Misdemeanors would also no longer be referred to a jury, but would once again come under the jurisdiction of the Criminal Court, and on appeal to the Royal Courts. Censorship was also reintroduced, under certain conditions, by being countersigned by at least 3 ministers between parliamentary sessions. Prior authorization was retained, considerably weakening the liberal press, which would be unable to express itself freely and would be targeted by the government. These laws were passed in February 1822 by 234 votes to 93 for the deputies, and 219 to 137 for the peers.

=== Royal return to restricting press freedom ===
The negative articles published by the newspapers against the king naturally led to the introduction of a law restricting freedom of the press. It was announced by the King in the Speech from the Throne inaugurating the 1827 session. This law applied to "brochures, i.e. writings less than or equal to twenty printed sheets, must henceforth be deposited with the Direction de la Librairie 5 days before publication", considerably increasing the cost of stamp duty, which had become prohibitive. This law also applies to newspapers. It also imposes financial, legal and civil liability on printers and owners, whose names must appear at the head of each copy. The law becomes retroactive, i.e. it applies to a period prior to its establishment (one month to comply). Each fine under these new provisions will be exorbitant (the main aim is to ruin newspapers deemed to be opposed to royal and ministerial policy). In a letter to the Journal des Débats, Chateaubriand dubbed these legislative provisions "the vandal laws". This law, also known as the "law of justice and love", was passed on March 12, 1827 by 233 votes to 134 (this victory for the opposition was known as the "Pyrrhic victory").

== Martignac ministry (January 1828-August 1829) ==
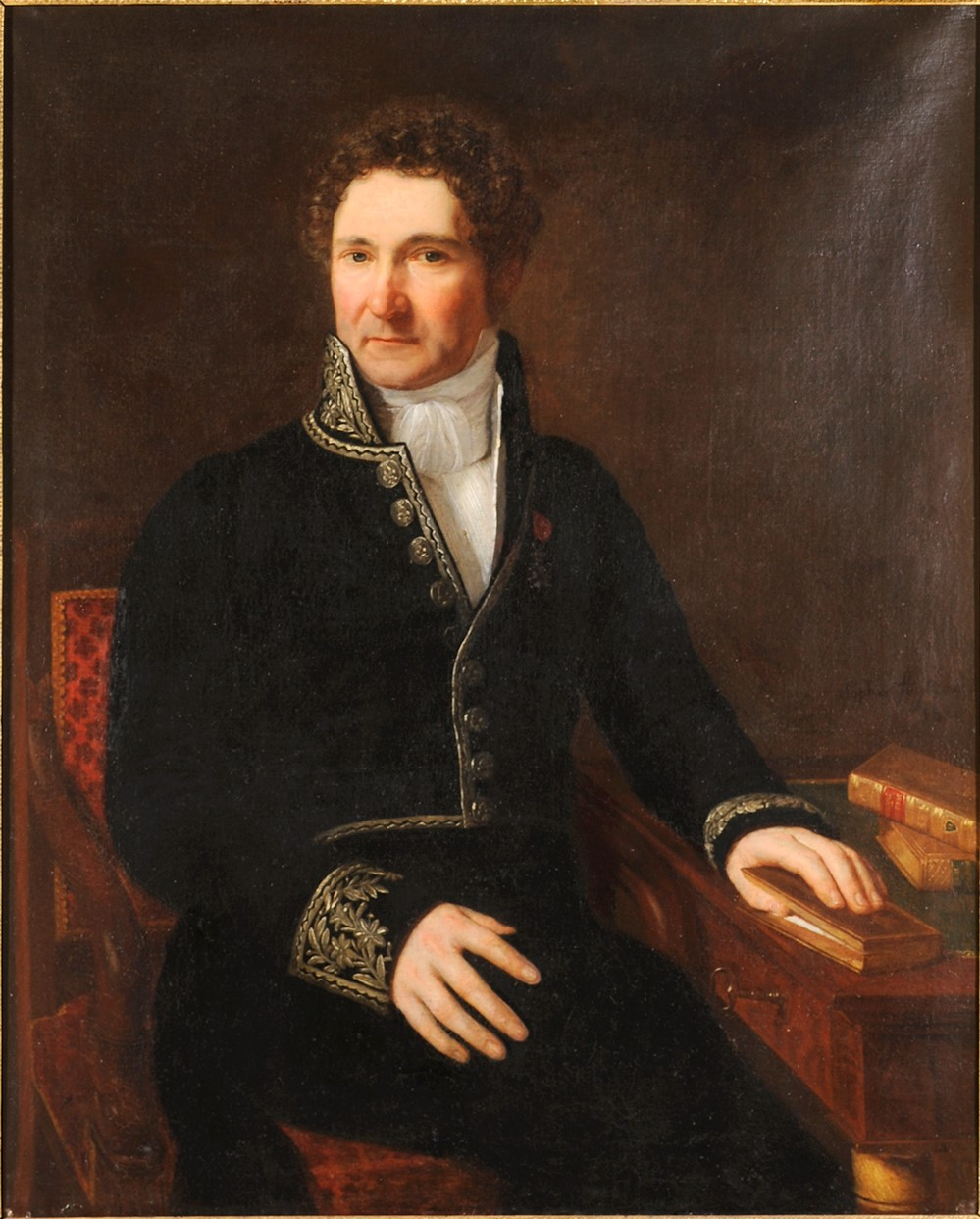
Jean-Baptiste Sylvère Gay, viscount of Martignac (1778 -1832)

=== Moderate government ===
Count Villèle was stripped of his status on January 4, 1828, in favor of his successor Martignac (a moderate). This new government wished to regain the graces of public opinion and, with the help of the jurist Portalis, legislated a series of laws designed to rehabilitate the founding principles of the press. Thus, on April 14, 1828, Portalis proposed a bill to abolish optional censorship, abolishing prior authorization in favor of a substantial bond making publishers financially and morally liable (henceforth set at two hundred thousand francs for political newspapers appearing more than twice a week). The jury could not be brought up to date, simply because of opposition from the Ultras, who refused to allow the French people to become judges in the place of competent men. The law was passed in early June 1828 and applied the same day.

== Polignac Ministry (August 1829-August 1830) ==
=== July Ordinances ===
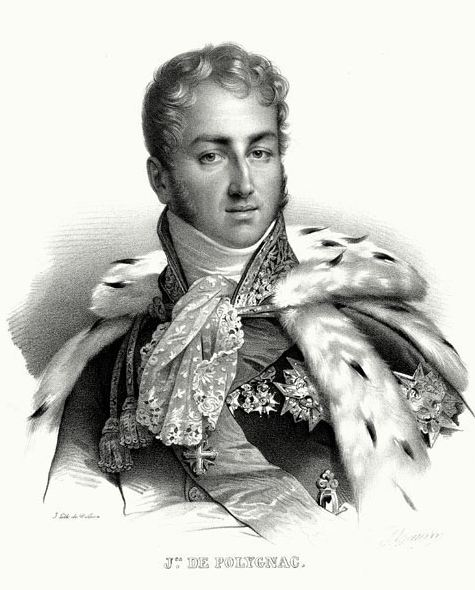
Jules, prince of Polignac (1780 -1847)

It was against this backdrop of conflict between political power and the opposition press that the July Ordinances were issued. On July 25, 1830, under article 14 of the Constitutional Charter, Charles X, with the support of his chief of council Polignac and his ministers, passed four ordinances, the first of which categorically suspended the freedom of the periodical press, re-establishing the requirement of prior authorization renewable every 3 months. This ordinance also restricted pamphlets (composed of more than 20 sheets not constituting a single work). Failure to comply with this order will result in the destruction or sealing of the works.

It has been argued that these ordinances are in keeping with the morals and principles of the Charter. Article 14 of the Charter stipulates that "The King is the supreme head of the State [...] that he makes the regulations and ordinances necessary for the execution of the laws and the security of the State". Others, on the contrary, claim that they run counter to Article 15, which stipulates that "Legislative power is exercised collectively by the King, the Chamber of Peers and the Chamber of Deputies of the Departments". The Charter thus lacks clarity in terms of the division of powers. Be that as it may, the King, for his part, assumed responsibility for his action under article 14, justifying it as a means of saving state security. His opponents, meanwhile, based their claims on article 15, accusing Charles X of abuse of power.

== See also ==
- Bourbon Restoration
- July Revolution
- Charter of 1814
- July Ordinances
- Freedom of the press

== Bibliography ==
- Barbier, Frédéric; Bertho Lavenir, Catherine (2009). Histoire des médias : de Diderot à Internet [History of media: From Diderot to the Internet]. U. Histoire (in French). Paris: A. Colin. ISBN 978-2-200-24433-0.
- Cayrol, Roland (1991). Les médias : presse écrite, radio, télévision [Medias: Written press, radio, television]. Thémis Science politique (in French). Paris: PUF. ISBN 2-13-043479-7.
- Ledré, Charles (1960). La presse à l'assaut de la monarchie [The press against the monarchy] (in French). Paris: A. Colin.
- Albertini, Pierre (2012). La France du XIXe siècle [France in the 19th century]. Les fondamentaux : histoire (in French). Paris: Éd. Hachette. ISBN 978-2-01-140009-3.
- Duclos, Solenn (2011). La liberté de la presse en France : héritage et actualité [Press freedom in France: heritage and contemporaneity]. Éducation aux médias (in French). Futuroscope. ISBN 978-2-240-03235-5.
- de Waresquiel, Emmanuel; Yvert, Benoît (2002). Histoire de la Restauration : naissance de la France moderne [History of the Restoration: the birth of modern France]. Tempus (in French). Paris: Perrin. ISBN 2-262-01901-0.
- Albert, Pierre (2010). Histoire de la presse [History of the press]. Que sais-je ? (in French). Paris: PUF. ISBN 978-2-13-058267-0.
- Crémieux, Albert (1912). La censure en 1820 et 1821 : Étude sur la presse politique et la résistance libérale, etc [Censorship in 1820 and 1821: Study on political press and Liberal resistance, etc.] (in French). Abbeville: Éd. Édouard Cornély et Compagnie.
