= Casimir de Rochechouart, 11th Duke of Mortemart =

French soldier, diplomat and politician

The Duke of Mortemart
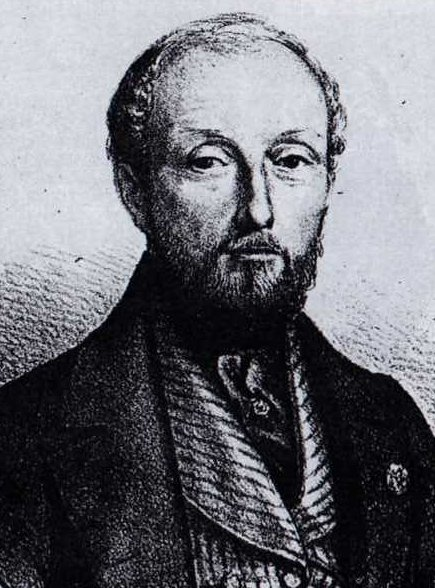

Prime Minister of France
- In office 29 July 1830
- Monarch: Charles X
- Preceded by: Jules de Polignac
- Succeeded by: Louis Philippe, Duke of Orléans

Personal details
- Born: 20 March 1787
- Died: 1 January 1875 (aged 87)
- Party: Ultra-royalist
- Parent(s): Victurnien de Rochechouart, 10th Duke of Mortemart; Adélaïde de Cossé

Casimir-Louis-Victurnien de Rochechouart, 11th Duke of Mortemart (20 March 1787, Paris – 1 January 1875, Neauphle-le-Vieux), prince of Tonnay-Charente, then Baron of Mortemart and of the Empire, 11th duke of Mortemart and peer of France (1814), was a French soldier, diplomat and politician. In 1830 Charles X of France made him president of the Conseil des ministres.

== Biography ==
He was the son of Victurnien de Rochechouart, 10th Duke of Mortemart (1752–1812), and his second wife, Adélaïde de Cossé (1765–1820), the only daughter of Louis-Hercule-Timoléon de Cossé, duc de Brissac (1734–92), and Adélaïde-Diane-Hortense-Délie Mancini (herself daughter of the duc de Nivernais). He and his family left France in 1791 and Casimir grew up in England, returning to France with his mother in 1801.

Despite belonging to one of the old noble families of France, he backed the First French Empire, joining the gendarmes d'ordonnance (commanded by the count of Ségur) in September 1803. He moved to the 1st Dragoon Regiment on 10 February 1806 and took part in the campaigns in Prussia (1806), Poland (1807), Austria (1809) and Russia (1812), fighting at Golymin (1806), Pułtusk (1806), Heilsberg and Friedland, where he proved his sang-froid and firmness under fire by beating off Russian attacks.

He was made a member of the Légion d'Honneur on 1 October 1807, a lieutenant in the 25th Dragoon Regiment and aide-de-camp to general Nansouty on 2 and 10 March 1809. He finally became a captain in the 25th Dragoon Regiment on the following 26 July.

He fought at Ratisbonne, Essling and Wagram and was made an officer of the ordinance on 12 February 1811 and put in charge of inspecting the coasts of Holland and Denmark. After his success there he rejoined Napoleon at Posen and took part in the 1812 campaign into Russia, during which he received the title of baron of the empire and a donation of 2,000 francs of revenue from Belgium.

Surviving the disasters of the retreat from Moscow, the baron of Mortemart returned to France with his health ruined – he was thus unable to take part in the last events of the following campaign. He fought at Leipzig and Hanau – his conduct at the latter gained him promotion to officer of the Légion d'honneur on 30 November 1813. He returned to France with the army.

In the 1814 campaign in France he was put in charge of presenting Marie Louise with the allied colours captured at Champ-Aubert, Nangis and Montereau. He was one of the first to fall out with Napoleon I. After the first Bourbon Restoration Louis XVIII made de Mortemart a peer of France on 4 June 1814 and captain-colonel of the Cent-Suisses de la Garde, a position also held by his maternal grandfather at the time of the French Revolution.

He was also made a knight of the Order of Saint Louis on 25 August 1814. On 20 March 1815, after Napoleon's return from Elba, de Mortemart escorted the princes as far as Béthune, where the king's military household was licensed. Shortly afterwards he rejoined Louis XVIII at Ghent and returned to France with the king in July.
He became Major-General of the National Guard of Paris in October 1815, Marshal-de-camp in November 1815, Grand Officer of the Legion of Honour in 1822, and Knight of the Holy Spirit in 1825. In April 1828, he was sent as ambassador to Saint Petersburg to replace le comte de La Ferronays, was promoted to lieutenant-general on the following 24 December and returned to France at the beginning of 1830.

When the July 1830 Revolution broke out, King Charles X thought he could stop it by making the concession to form a new government on 29 July led by de Mortemart, but his government was disposed the same day. Having taken the oath to the government of July, de Mortemart continued to sit in senate. He was again appointed ambassadeur extraordinaire to Saint Petersburg in 1833 and commander of the 19th military Division at Bourges between 1852 and 1855.
