= François Mauguin =

French lawyer and politician

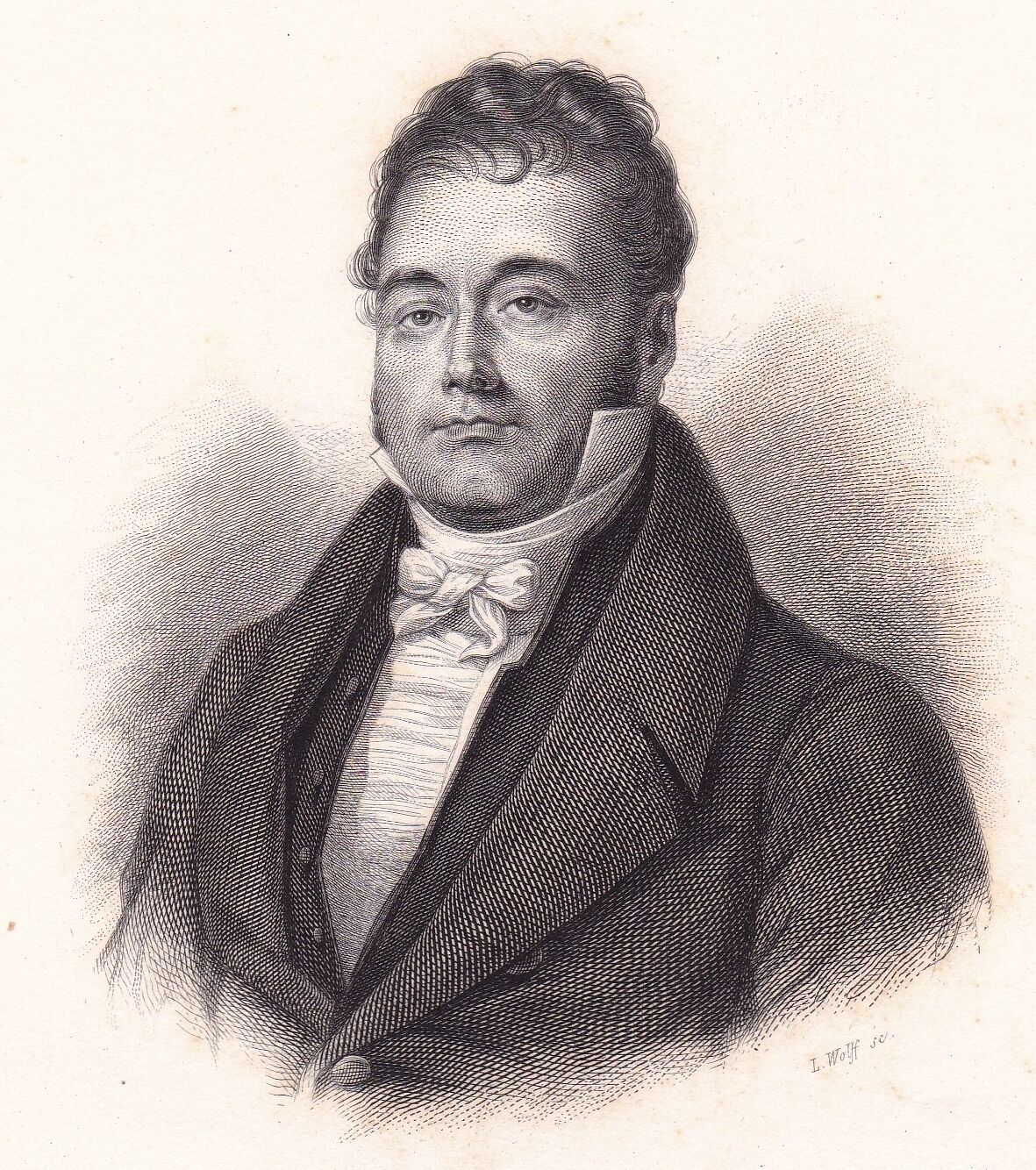
- Born: 24 February 1785; Dijon, Province of Burgundy, France
- Died: 4 June 1854 (aged 69); Saumur, Maine-et-Loire, France
- Occupations: Lawyer and politician
- Known for: Member of the 1830 Municipal Commission

François Mauguin (24 February 1785 - 4 June 1854) was a French lawyer and politician. He was a Deputy from 1827 to 1848 and a Representative in 1848 and 1849. He played a leading role in the July Revolution of 1830. At first a passionate liberal, he later became increasingly conservative.

== Early life ==
François Mauguin was born at Dijon, Côte-d'Or, on 24 February 1785. He was the son of a prosecutor (procureur au parlement) and studied for the bar. He completed his legal studies at the Academy of Law and then the Law School of Paris, graduating in 1804. He became an advocate during the First French Empire.

== Bourbon Restoration ==
In 1815 Mauguin pleaded before the appeals court for Charles de la Bédoyère, who had been sentenced to death by a court-martial. He did not win his case, but made his reputation as an orator. After this he spoke successfully in several political cases. Mauguin obtained the acquittal of the servant of Lavalette, accused of having helped the escape of his master. Mauguin pleaded for Pleignier in the case of the "patriots of 1816", and again won an acquittal for the Knights of the Black Table. His arguments in favor of the editors of the Bibliothèque historique (Historical Library) had a great impact and made law. In 1819 he earned further fame at the trial of Colonel Fabvier and Senneville, accused of defamation by General Canuel. After this he stayed out of court for some time due to a disease of the larynx. He returned to his position as one of the most prominent advocates in 1823.

Mauguin was an ardent Liberal, and ran for election on 17 November 1827 in two constituencies. He was elected for both the 2nd arrondissement of Côte-d'Or (Beaune) and the 2nd arrondissement of Deux-Sèvres (Niort). He chose to represent Beaune. Mauguin sat in the most advanced group of the constitutional opposition and fought the Ministry of Jules de Polignac. He was reelected in Beaune on 25 June 1830.

== July Revolution of 1830 ==
Mauguin was a strong opponent of the July Ordinances, advocating resistance. During the July Revolution he took part in several meetings in Paris. When most of the deputies in Paris met in the salon of Casimir Pierre Périer, Mauguin spoke up for a protest against the press censorship ordinances. During the meeting at the home of Pierre-François Audry de Puyraveau, with the windows open and the courtyard filled with a noisy and animated crowd, Mauguin said, "This is a revolution we have to lead. We have to choose between the royal guard and the people." When François Guizot read a draft protest, Mauguin was among those who objected to including the terms "loyalty to the king" and "advisers false to the intentions of the monarch" while blood was flowing in Paris.

On 29 July 1830 the deputies who had remained in Paris met at Lafitte's house and named an interim Municipal Commission composed of Jacques Laffitte, Casimir Pierre Périer, Georges Mouton, Auguste de Schonen, Pierre-François Audry de Puyraveau and François Mauguin. General Lafayette was appointed commander of the National Guard. Mauguin did not have great influence among his colleagues in the commission, and there was a marked difference of opinion between him and Odilon Barrot. Mauguin did name Bavoux Commissioner of Police and Chardel postmaster, proclaimed that the French monuments were under the protection of the people and issued various circulars to address urgent needs.

The Municipal Commission received the envoys of King Charles X but refused to treat with them. They also admitted a popular deputation that insisted, unsuccessfully, on the need to consult the nation and not to establish authority without first ensuring safeguards for civil liberty. The commission ordered a levy of twenty battalions of the Mobile Guard, proclaimed the deposition of Charles X, and organized the expedition that forced the king to flee from his residence at Rambouillet.

== July Monarchy ==
After the revolution, Mauguin participated in the chamber in the discussion of the new Charter, but he did not stay in accord with the July Monarchy for long. He became, in competition with his rival Odilon Barrot, one of the recognized leaders of the opposition to the dynasty. The chamber named Mauguin one of the commissioners, along with Thomas Bérenger and Joseph Madier de Montjau, who interrogated the former ministers of Charles X at the Château de Vincennes. The process attracted much public notice. During the trial Mauguin was thwarted by his colleagues. A contemporary said they resented his thinly concealed arrogance.

Mauguin was repeatedly reelected deputy for Beaune on 5 July 1831, 21 June 1834, 4 November 1837, 9 July 1842 and 1 August 1846. In the new chamber, Mauguin became the center of the military party, supported by General Lamarque, in favor of military intervention in the Mediterranean, in Europe and further afield. In a vigorous speech in the chamber on 13 November 1831 he said that France should not be chained by the treaties of 1814, and supported action in Belgium and Spain. After the death of General Lamarque his interest turned to the colonies, where he surprised the democrats by his support for the French settlers and opposition to abolition of slavery. His unpredictable opinions lost him friends, and he became isolated in the chamber. In the last years of the July Monarchy his views seem to have changed, and he became a supporter of the Franco-Russian alliance.

== Second Republic and Second Empire ==
With the February Revolution of 1848 Mauguin lost much of his influence. He was accused of having become involved in dubious speculations, of having made unexplained use of secret funds for the colonies, and of having privately bought the journal Commerce and then resold it to Prince Louis Bonaparte. He was reelected on 23 April 1848 as Representative in the Constituent Assembly for Côte-d'Or. He was a member of the Foreign Affairs Committee and was appointed rapporteur of the Committee on Taxation of beverages, which he favored abolishing. He generally voted with the right. He supported the expedition to Rome in which the short-lived Roman Republic was suppressed and Pope Pius IX was restored to his temporal powers. Mauguin was reelected to the Legislative Assembly for Côte-d'Or on 13 May 1849. He took an active role in the chamber, especially with regard to foreign affairs.

On 27 December 1850, when a creditor was prosecuting him, Mauguin was arrested and taken to the prison in the rue de Clichy, where he was held by a decision of the Civil Court of the Seine. The Assembly was outraged by this violation of the immunity of its members, and passed a resolution to have a line battalion force his release. After the coup of 2 December 1851 Mauguin returned to private life. He retired to live with his daughter, the Countess of Rochefort. He died at Saumur, Maine-et-Loire, on 4 June 1854. His nephew, Alexandre Mauguin, was deputy, then senator of Algeria between 1881 and 1894.

== Sources ==
- Mohamed-Gaillard, Sarah; Romo-Navarette, Maria (2005), Des français outre-mer: une approche prosopographique au service de l'histoire contemporaine, Presses Paris Sorbonne, ISBN 978-2-84050-368-2
- Muel, Léon (1891). Gouvernements, ministères et constitutions de la France depuis cent ans: Précis historique des révolutions, des crises ministérielles et gouvernementales, et des changements de constitutions de la France depuis 1789 jusqu'en 1890 ... Marchal et Billard.
- Robert, Adolphe; Couchy, Gaston (1891). "MAUGUIN (François)" (PDF). Dictionnaire des Parlementaires Français comprenant tous les membres des Assemblées Françaises et tous les Ministres Français depuis le 1er mai 1789 jusqu'au 1er mai 1889. Vol. 4. Bourloton.
- Robert, Adolphe; Cougny, Gaston (1889–1891b), "MAUGUIN (ALEXANDRE)", in Edgar Bourloton (ed.), Dictionnaire des Parlementaires français (1789–1889) (in French)
