= Pierre de Saint-Cricq =

French customs administrator and politician

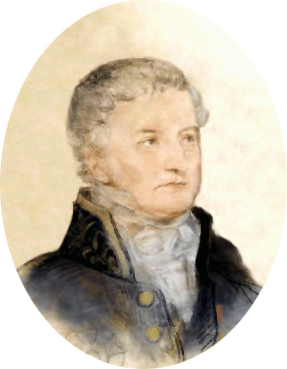
- Born: 24 August 1772; Orthez, Pyrénèes-Atlantiques, France
- Died: 25 February 1854 (aged 81); Pau, Pyrénées-Atlantiques, France
- Occupations: Customs administrator and politician
- Known for: Minister of Commerce and Industry

Pierre Laurent Barthélemy François Charles de Saint-Cricq (24 August 1772 – 25 February 1854) was a French customs administrator and politician. He was a deputy from 1815–20 and 1824–33, Minister of Commerce & Manufacturing (1828–29) and a peer of France.

== Early years ==
Pierre Laurent Barthélemy François Charles de Saint-Cricq was born in Orthez, Pyrénèes-Atlantiques, on 24 August 1772. He was the son of Jean-Paul-Louis de Saint-Cricq, knight of the military order of St. Louis, Governor for the King of the castles of Minerve and Puisserguier in Languedoc, and of dame Marie-Laurence-Josèphe-Raphaëlle-Pétronille de Mazanedo. His family had belonged to the French aristocracy for several centuries. His parents intended that he should become a priest, and sent him to school at the Barnabites monastery in Lescar, near Pau. However, when the French Revolution (1789–1799) broke out, he moved to Paris where he attended the university.

Saint-Cricq married Jeanne-Clémence Lenain de Tillemont (10 May 1770 – 30 June 1828). They had three sons and one daughter. Their first son was born in 1796. The youngest child, Caroline, was born on 9 November 1810. (Note: Saint-Cricq's daughter Caroline was educated privately before becoming a student of Franz Liszt, the composer, in 1828. They fell in love, but Saint-Cricq would not allow them to marry.) Saint-Cricq did not appear in public life until the advent of Napoleon. He joined the Customs administration in the First French Empire, and quickly rose to the rank of division chief.

== Bourbon Restoration ==
After the Bourbon Restoration Saint-Cricq was sponsored by Élie, duc Decazes. He was appointed Commander of the Legion of Honour and Count on 10 April 1814. Saint-Cricq was appointed Director General of Customs, taking office on 8 July 1815. On 27 August 1815 he was named Councillor of State in ordinary service. He was appointed to the Finance committee. His appointment to the Customs service was confirmed by royal ordinance of 12 October 1815.

On 22 August 1815 Saint-Cricq was elected deputy for Seine-et-Marne. He sat with the majority in the Chamber. In 1816 he was again named Councillor of State on the Finance committee. He was reelected on 4 October 1816 and 20 October 1818. He took a centrist position, and often spoke on the budget, the press, recruitment, Customs, smuggling and elections. Beside his fixed salary, between 1815 and 1817 Saint-Cricq received bonuses that amounted to 170,000 francs.

Saint-Cricq supported the emergency laws and the new electoral system. In 1820 he defended the Ministry of Élie Decazes and supported restoration of censorship. He was reelected on 13 November 1820 deputy for Basses-Pyrénées. However, the Chamber annulled this election on 22 December 1820. He was returned for Basses-Pyrénées on 6 March 1824 and on 17 November 1827. On 4 January 1828 Saint-Cricq was appointed by King Charles X of France to the Ministry of Jean-Baptiste de Martignac, with the portfolio of Agriculture and Commerce. He held this position until 9 August 1829 when the Martignac cabinet was replaced by the Ministry of Jules de Polignac. He was reelected on 19 July 1830.

== Later career ==
After the July Revolution Saint-Cricq adhered to the monarchy of Louis Philippe. He was reelected on 5 July 1831 deputy for Basses-Pyrénées (Orthez). On 27 June 1833 Saint-Cricq was promoted to Peer of France. After the February Revolution of 1848 he returned to private life. He died in Pau, Pyrénées-Atlantiques, on 25 February 1854 at the age of 81.

== Sources ==
- Duvergier, Jean Baptiste (1827). Collection complète des lois, décrets, ordonnances, réglemens et avis du Conseil d'état: publiée sur les éditions officielles du Louvre, de l'Imprimerie nationale par Baudouin et du Bulletin des lois, de 1788 à 1824 inclusivement. [Suivie d'une table analytique et raisonnée des matières.]. A. Guyot et Scribe.
- France (1833). Bulletin des lois de la République franc̜aise. Imprimerie nationale.
- gnieveld (10 June 2012). "Meet Caroline de Saint-Cricq and her family". SantCricq.com.
- Robert, Adolphe; Cougny, Gaston (1891). "Saint-Cricq (Pierre-Laurent-Barthélemy, Comte de)". Dictionnaire des parlementaires français de 1789 à 1889 (PDF). Vol. V de PLA à ZUY. Archived from the original (PDF) on 2014-04-22.
