= Second White Terror =

1815 persecution of French revolutionaries

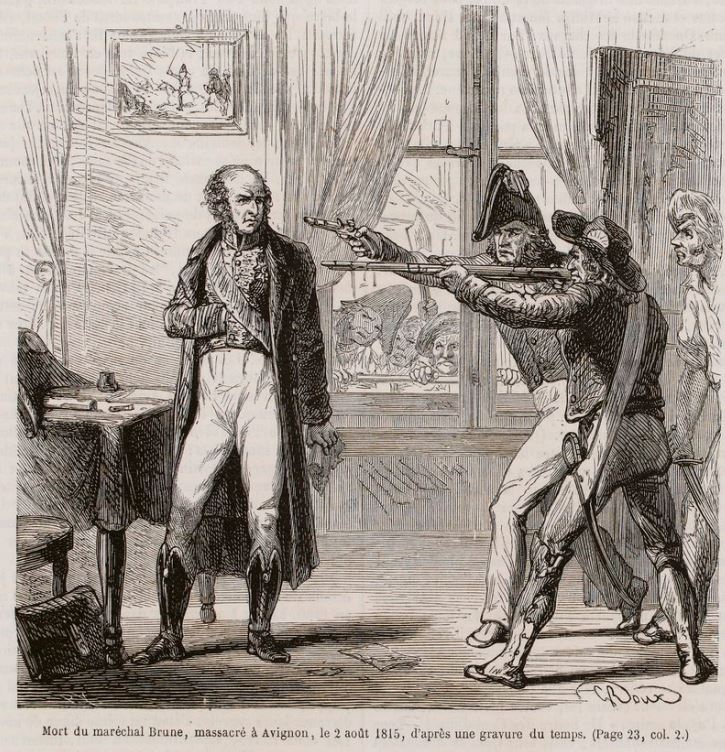
The murder of Guillaume Brune, Marshal of the Empire, by a royalist mob in Avignon on 2 August 1815, engraved c. 1865

The Second White Terror (French: Terreur blanche de 1815) occurred in France in 1815–1816, following the defeat of Napoleon at the Battle of Waterloo (18 June 1815) and the enthronement of Louis XVIII as King of France after the Hundred Days. Suspected sympathizers of the French Revolution (including former Jacobins), Republicans, Bonapartists and, to a minor degree, Protestants, suffered persecution. Several hundred were killed by angry mobs or executed after a quick trial at a drumhead court-martial.

Historian John B. Wolf argues that Ultra-royalists — many of whom had just returned from exile — were staging a counter-revolution against the French Revolution and also against Napoleon's revolution.

Throughout the Midi — in Provence, Avignon, Languedoc, and many other places — the White Terror raged with unrelenting ferocity. The royalists found in the willingness of the French to desert the king fresh proof of their theory that the nation was honeycombed with traitors, and used every means to seek out and destroy their enemies. The government was powerless or unwilling to intervene.

The period is named after the First White Terror that occurred during the Thermidorian Reaction in 1794–1795, when people identified as being associated with Robespierre's Reign of Terror (by means of distinction, also known as the "Red Terror") were harassed and killed.

== Bourbon reprisals ==
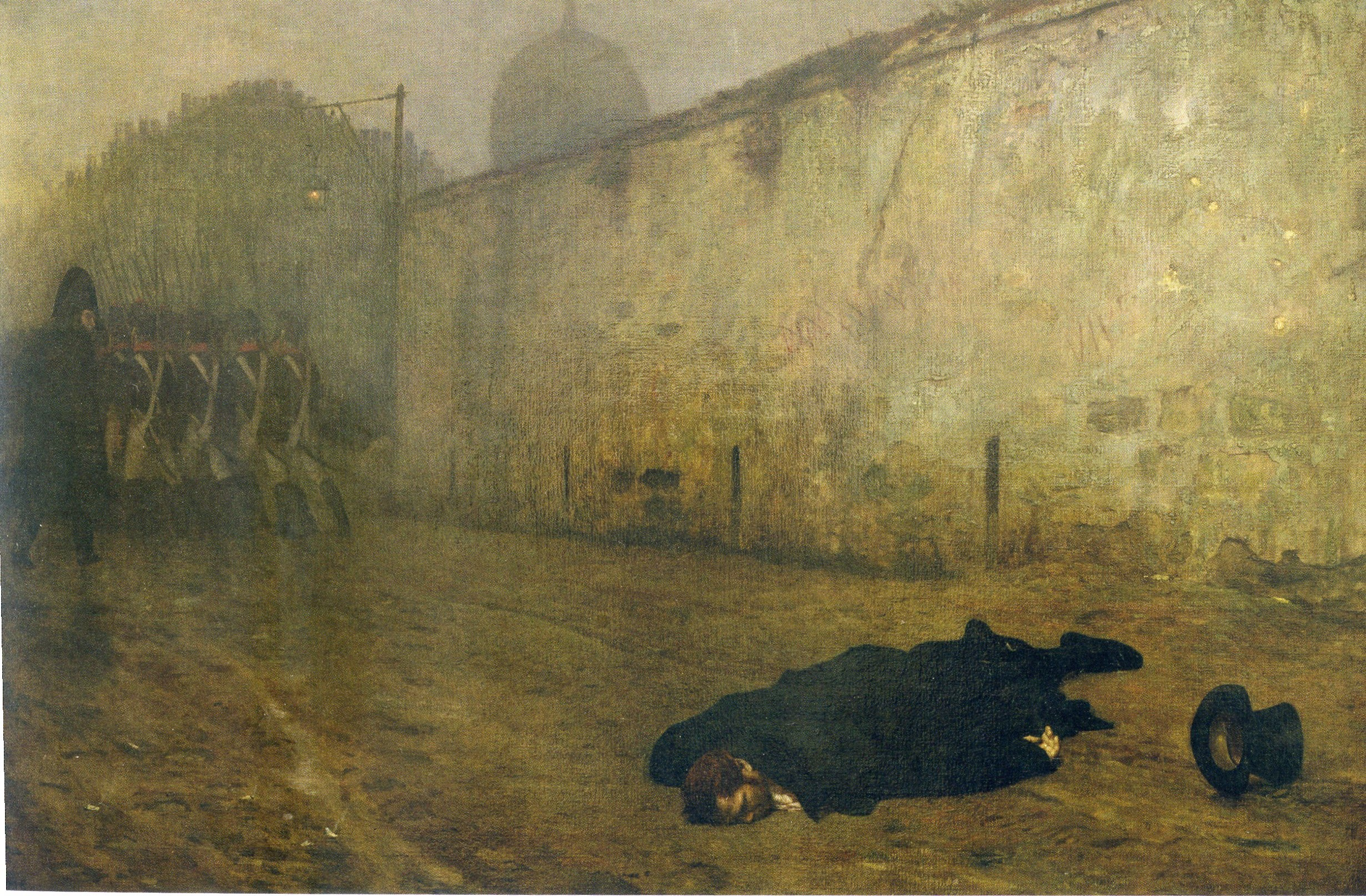
The Execution of Marshal Ney, 1868 painting by Jean-Léon Gérôme

After the Hundred Days, Napoleon's brief return to power in 1815, the second White Terror focused mainly on the purging of a civilian administration which had almost completely turned against the Bourbon monarchy. About 70,000 officials were dismissed from their positions. The remnants of the Napoleonic army were disbanded after the Battle of Waterloo and its senior officers cashiered. Marshal Michel Ney was executed for treason, Marshal Guillaume Brune was murdered by a royalist mob in Avignon, and General Jean-Pierre Ramel was assassinated in Toulouse. Approximately 6,000 individuals who had rallied to Napoleon were brought to trial. There were about 300 mob lynchings in the south of France, notably in Marseille, where a large number of his Mamelukes were massacred in their barracks.

== Chambre introuvable ==
These actions struck fear in the population, persuading liberal and moderate electors (48,000 of the 72,000 voters eligible under the franchise in force) to vote for the ultra-royalists in the August 1815 elections. According to Winkler Prins (2002), the royalist electoral victory 'provided the Terror legality'. Of 402 members, the first Chamber of Deputies of the Restoration was composed of 350 ultra-royalists; the king himself thus named it the Chambre introuvable ("the Unobtainable Chamber"), called as such because the Chamber was "more royalist than the king" (plus royalistes que le roi) in Louis XVIII's words. Meanwhile, the upper house, the Chamber of Peers, whose members were appointed by the King and served at his pleasure, sentenced Marshal Michel Ney and the Comte Charles de la Bédoyère to death for treason, while 250 people were given prison sentences and some others exiled, including Joseph Fouché, Lazare Carnot, and Cambacérès. The surviving "regicides" who had voted for the execution of Louis XVI in 1792 were exiled. The White Terror in the political sphere ended when Louis XVIII disbanded the Chambre introuvable in 1816, putting an end to the ultra-royalist excesses, as he feared it would provoke a new revolution.

== See also ==
- White Terror (disambiguation)
- Red Terror (disambiguation)
- Press freedom under the Restoration
