= Auguste de Schonen =

French lawyer and politician

- Born: 12 February 1782; Saint-Denis, Seine-St-Denis, France
- Died: 4 December 1849 (aged 67); Paris, France
- Occupations: Lawyer, politician

Baron Auguste Jean Marie de Schonen (12 February 1782 – 4 December 1849) was a French lawyer and politician. He was a deputy in the National Assembly, and played a leading role in the July Revolution of 1830. Later he became more conservative and was made a peer of France by King Louis Philippe.

== Early years ==
Auguste Jean Marie de Schonen was born at Saint-Denis, Seine-St-Denis, on 12 February 1782. His parents were Gaspard de Schonen, major of the 4th regiment of the army staff and a knight of Saint-Louis, and Marie Louise de Salis. He studied law.

In 1811 he was named Judge Auditor at the imperial court of Paris. During the Hundred Days, when Napoleon returned from exile, he served as Advocate General.

== Bourbon Restoration ==
After the second Bourbon Restoration de Schonen was demoted to assistant prosecutor. In 1819, despite having been a member of the Carbonari leadership, he was made a counselor at the royal court. In the exercise of his duties he showed liberal views and became popular with the constitutional party. On 19 May 1824 he married Claudine Thérèse Geneviève Tircuy de Corcelle (1800-1882). They had one child, Etienne de Schonen (1832–1916).

De Schonen was elected deputy for the 5th arrondissement of Paris on 17 November 1827. He joined the ranks of the opposition, opposed the Ministry of Jules de Polignac and voted for the address of the 221.

== July Revolution ==
De Schonen was reelected on 12 July 1830 and threw himself into the revolutionary cause. At the meeting of the protesters in the office of Le National he said it was no longer a question of debate but of action. He called for opposing violence with violence, repelling force by force. On 29 July 1830 the deputies who had remained in Paris met at Lafitte's house and named an interim Municipal Commission composed of Jacques Laffitte, Casimir Pierre Périer, Georges Mouton, Auguste de Schonen, Pierre-François Audry de Puyraveau and François Mauguin. General Lafayette was appointed commander of the National Guard. De Schonen and two other commissioners accompanied King Charles X of France to monitor his embarkation for England.

== July Monarchy ==
At this time de Schonen became a member of the municipal council of Paris and colonel of the 9th Legion of the National Guard. He was appointed liquidator of the former civil list, and was named by King Louis-Philippe to the position of Attorney General to the Court of Accounts. He was also made chairman of the supervisory board of the royal house at Charenton, a member of the Board of Directors of the Institution for the Young Blind and other posts. De Schonen was reelected on 5 July 1831 and 21 July 1834. He was appointed Grand Officer of the Legion of Honor on 2 June 1837.

De Schonen supported the conservative government policy both in the House of Representatives, where he was Vice President in 1832, 1833 and 1834, and in the Chamber of Peers, to which he was promoted on 3 October 1837, to the disgust of his former political friends. After the February Revolution of 1848 de Schonen returned to private life. He died in Paris on 4 December 1849.
