= Jean-Pierre Ramel =

French Army officer

Jean-Pierre Ramel (1768 – 15 August 1815) was a French Army officer who served during the French Revolutionary and Napoleonic Wars. Following the Hundred Days, he was assassinated by French royalists in Toulouse during the Second White Terror. His older brother, also named Jean-Pierre, served as a deputy of the French Parliament and had worked on the Constitution.

== Early life ==
Ramel entered a French infantry regiment as a volunteer at the age of fifteen. In 1791 he became adjutant-major in the Legion of Lot. In 1792 he was promoted to captain and the next year he became a battalion commander. After being imprisoned, he obtained his liberty due to the efforts of General Dugommier and in 1796 he was promoted to adjutant-general in the army of the Rhin-et-Moselle. Charged with the defense of Kehl he successfully repulsed the attack of the Archduke Charles.

=== Promotion to commander and capture ===
In the same year, Ramel was made commander of the Guard of the Legislature, in which capacity he denounced the royalist conspiracy of Brottier (30 January 1797). Being suspect of royalist sympathies himself, he was disarmed by Pierre Augereau during the Coup of 18 fructidor an V (4 September 1797). Following his arrest he was conveyed to the Temple where he was imprisoned. The next day he and Pichegru, Barthélémy, Laffon de Ladebat, Barbé-Marbois were condemned and deported to the penal colonies in Guiana. In June 1798, Ramel escaped from the penal colony to Paramaribo and then went to London.

After receiving permission to return to France, he was reinstated into the French Army and assigned to the Saint-Domingue expedition under General Donatien de Rochambeau. On 8 January 1803, Ramel was wounded in a firefight with Black rebels and was subsequently appointed by Rochambeau, now the commander-in-chief of all French forces in Saint-Domingue, as the commander of the island of Tortuga. He received an order written by Rochambeau on 5 April which read:

I am sending you, my dear commander, a detachment of one hundred and fifty men from the National Guard of Cap‑Français. They are accompanied by twenty-eight bulldog dogs. These reinforcements will enable you to fully complete your operations. I must inform you that no rations or expenses will be charged for the feeding of these dogs. You must feed them Negroes. Yours affectionately, Donatien Rochambeau.

Ramel was eventually evacuated back to France; after his return, he denounced French atrocities in Saint Dominigue:

Who were the men whom we drowned in Saint-Domingue? Blacks who had been captured as prisoners on the fields of battle? No; Conspirators? Even less so! Nobody was convicted of anything: because of a simple suspicion, a report, an equivocal word, 200, 400, 800, up to 1,500 blacks had been thrown into the sea. I saw this happen, and I complained about it.

He served in the 1805 campaign under Massena in Italy and was given the command responsible for defending the Mediterranean coast. In 1809 he was employed in the gendarmerie and in 1810–1811 he fought in the campaigns in Spain and Portugal, where he distinguished himself at the siege of Astorga.

=== Promotion to major general ===
After the Bourbon Restoration, Ramel was made Maréchal de camp (major general) and awarded the Order of Saint Louis. He was given command of the department of Haute-Garonne, where he attempted to moderate the influence of reactionary political elements. Suspected of being a loyalist of the now deposed Napoleon Bonaparte, the reactionaries had him assassinated in Toulouse on 15 August 1815.
