= Charles Lemercier de Longpré, baron d'Haussez =

French politician and minister

Charles Lemercier de Longpre, baron d'Haussez (20 October 1778, Neufchâtel-en-Bray (Normandy) – 10 November 1854, Saint-Saëns (Seine-Maritime)) was a French politician and minister.

== Biography ==
The Baron of Haussez came from a family of magistrates with deep links to the Old Regime. Soon after graduating, and still quite young, he took part in the royalist plots that occurred at the end of the revolutionary period. He served in the "royal army in Normandy, was reported to the police, prosecuted, and had to hide until 1804. He began to conspire and was compromised in the case of the attempted landing and Pichegru. Accused of conspiracy, he was prosecuted but acquitted for lack of evidence.

He seemed to rally enthusiastically to the Empire and was created Baron of the Empire (November 1805) and appointed mayor of his hometown of Neuchâtel (now Neufchâtel-en-Bray). But he soon regain his Legitimist inclination. Eager to welcome Louis XVIII at the head of a Neufchâtel delegation, he took command of the National Guard after Waterloo, was general councilor of the Lower Seine, and he was elected by the general department of the college on 22 August 1815. He had previously failed, on 10 May, as a candidate for the Chamber of the Hundred Days in the borough of Neufchâtel-en-Bray.

After the dissolution of the House, which he welcomed, he was not re-elected and was appointed prefect of the Landes (28 May 1817), prefect of the Gard (19 March 1819) and prefect of Isère (1820). It was under his administration that the troubles of Grenoble (1821) broke out, following the revolution in Piedmont. General Pamphile de Lacroix, who commanded the military region, ordered the state of siege, which Haussez appealed to the government, obtaining the withdrawal of the measure. He nevertheless took a personal and most active part in the bloody repression that ensued.

He was prefect of the Gironde (7 April 1824), State Councilor and Officer of the Legion of Honor, he returned to the Chamber of Deputies on 17 November 1827, elected by the 2nd District electoral Landes (Dax). He served in the majority, but when Charles X was separated from the Viscount Martignac to call the Prince de Polignac to form a new ministry, on 23 August 1829, he was assigned the portfolio of the Navy, replacing Vice - Admiral Rigny.

He started his government assignment with the preparation and conduct of the expedition to Algiers. With his colleagues Bourmont, Courvoisier and Guernon Ranville, he contributed to revoke the treaty first signed with the envoys of the Pasha of Egypt, Muhammad Ali, whereby the latter was responsible for waging war against the pirates in Africa and avenging the blow given by the Dey of Algiers to the consul of France. Once it had been decided that France itself would retaliate, England asked in vain for explanations, complained and even resorted to threats. The French informed the English authorities that the king would not lay down arms until France had reached the double goal the king had set, the immediate cause of hostilities and, secondly, the triumph of Interest common to all Christendom. That attitude deeply angered England. In Paris, the British Ambassador, Sir Charles Stuart tried to intimidate the Baron in a semi-diplomatic manner. The Minister of the Navy rejected the threats.

He eagerly continued preparations for the war effort. In all ports of the kingdom, he doubled the burden on workers and their wages and chartered in under three months one hundred warships and four hundred transports. He rescinded the appointment of Admiral Roussin in command of the fleet, and gave the command to Admiral Duperré, the maritime prefect in Brest.

He signed the orders of St. Cloud's on 25 July 1830. When the victory was gained for the insurgency, he went to St. Cloud with Charles X, then to Dieppe, and thence to England.

Involved in the trial of ministers, he was sentenced in absentia, on 11 April 1831, to life imprisonment. He spent his time in exile to visit Italy, Switzerland and Germany and returned to France, after the amnesty of 1839 and took up his residence in the department of Seine-Lower. He gave up politics and died in 1854 at the castle of Saint-Saëns.

Political offices
Preceded by Henri de Rigny	Minister of the Marine; 23 August 1829 - 31 July 1830	Succeeded by Henri de Rigny
