= Ministry of Jean-Baptiste de Martignac =

French government ministry from 1828–1929

- Cabinet of France

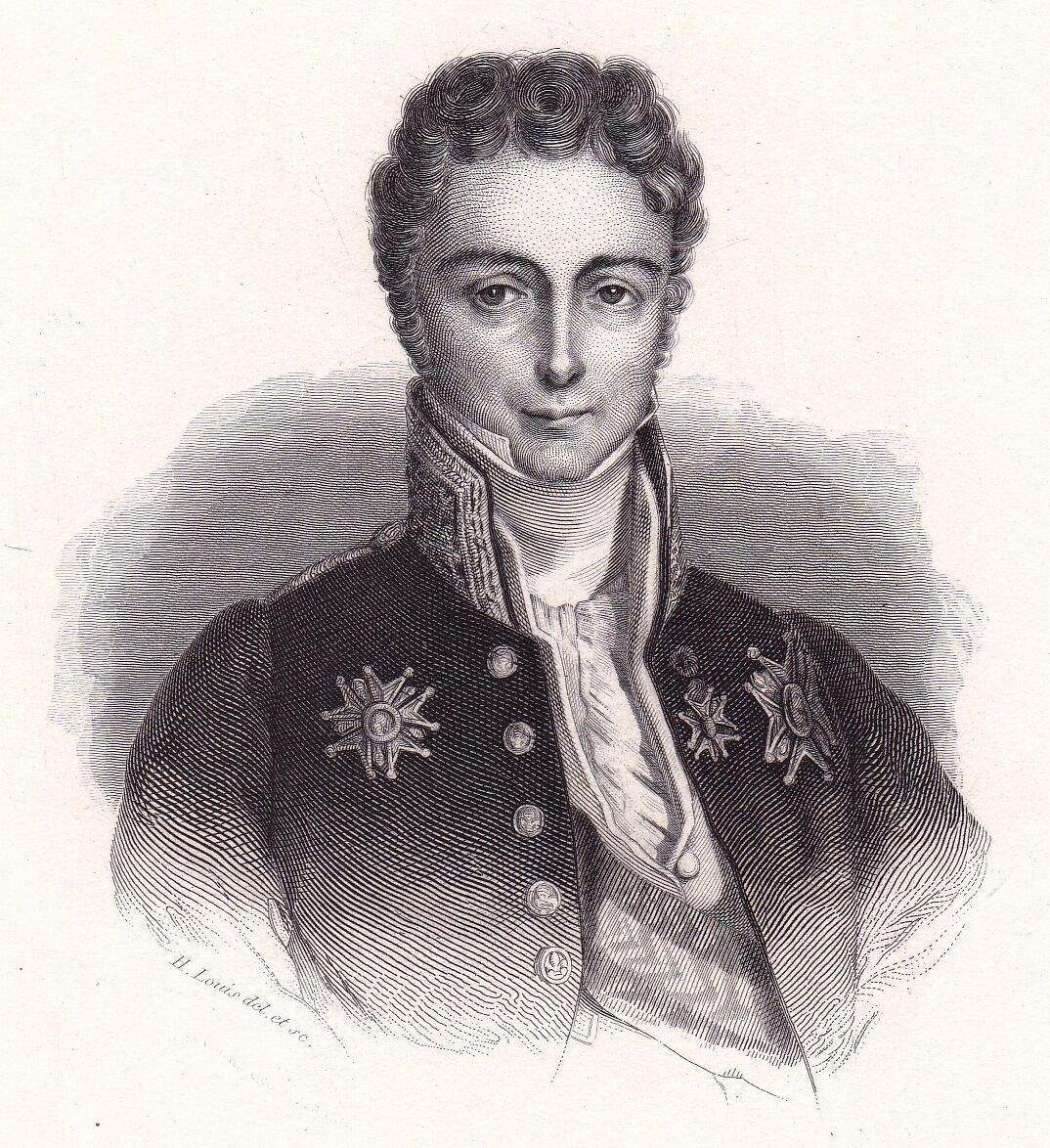
- Jean Baptiste Gay de Martignac
- Date formed: 4 January 1828
- Date dissolved: 8 August 1829

People and organisations
- Head of state: Charles X of France
- Head of government: Jean Baptiste Gay de Martignac

History
- Predecessor: Ministry of Joseph de Villèle
- Successor: Ministry of Jules de Polignac

The Ministry of Jean-Baptiste de Martignac was formed on 4 January 1828 after the dismissal of the Ministry of Joseph de Villèle by King Charles X of France. The ministry was replaced on 8 August 1829 by the Ministry of Jules de Polignac.

== Ministers ==
The ministers were:

Portfolio	Holder	Party
President of the Council of Ministers	The Viscount of Martignac (Informal, head of the ministry)	Conservative
Ministers
Minister of the Interior	The Viscount of Martignac	Conservative
Minister of Foreign Affairs	Marshal Count of La Ferronays	None
Minister of Finance	Antoine Roy	Constitutional
Minister of Justice	The Count Portalis	Conservative
Minister of War	Lt. General Viscount of Blacquetot	Constitutional
Minister of the Navy and Colonies	The Count of Chambrol	Conservative
Minister of Public Education	Antoine Lefebvre de Vatimesnil	Ultras
Minister of Worship	Bishop Count of Frayssinous	Ultras
Minister of Commerce and Industry	Pierre de Saint-Cricq	Constitutional

== Changes ==
On 3 March 1828:

Portfolio	Holder	Party
Minister of the Navy and Colonies	The Baron Hyde de Neuville	Constitutional
Minister of Worship	Bishop François-Jean-Hyacinthe Feutrier	Ultras

On 14 May 1829:

Portfolio	Holder	Party
Minister of Justice	Pierre-Alpinien Bourdeau	Ultras

== Sources ==
- Muel, Léon (1891). Gouvernements, ministères et constitutions de la France depuis cent ans: Précis historique des révolutions, des crises ministérielles et gouvernementales, et des changements de constitutions de la France depuis 1789 jusqu'en 1890 ... Marchal et Billard.
