= Henri de Rigny =

French aristocrat and naval commander (1782–1835)

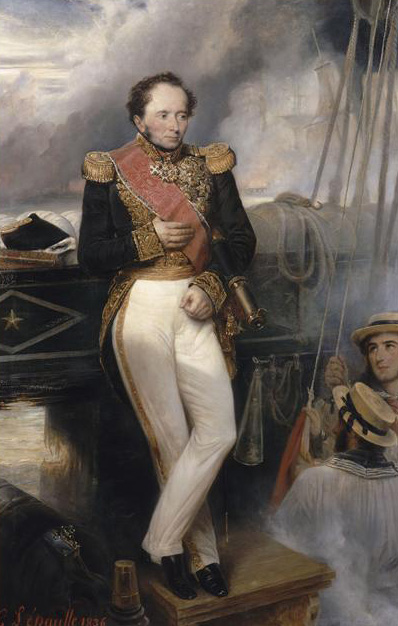
Admiral de Rigny; portrait by François-Gabriel Lépaulle (1836)

Marie Henri Daniel Gauthier, comte de Rigny (French pronunciation: [ɑ̃ʁi də ʁiɲi]; 2 February 1782 – 6 November 1835) was the commander of the French squadron at the Battle of Navarino in the Greek War of Independence.

== Biography ==
=== Family ===
He was a nephew of Baron Joseph Dominique, baron Louis, and son of a former captain in the Penthièvre Dragoon regiment, and who died leaving five small boys, including his brother, the future General Rigny. The French Revolution led him out of the Pont-à-Mousson school, where he had been sent. He was ten years old then, had lost his father and his mother was listed as the list of emigrants. An aunt collected the family, consisting of a young girl of sixteen years and five boys, including Henry, the eldest.

=== Entry in the Naval Forces ===
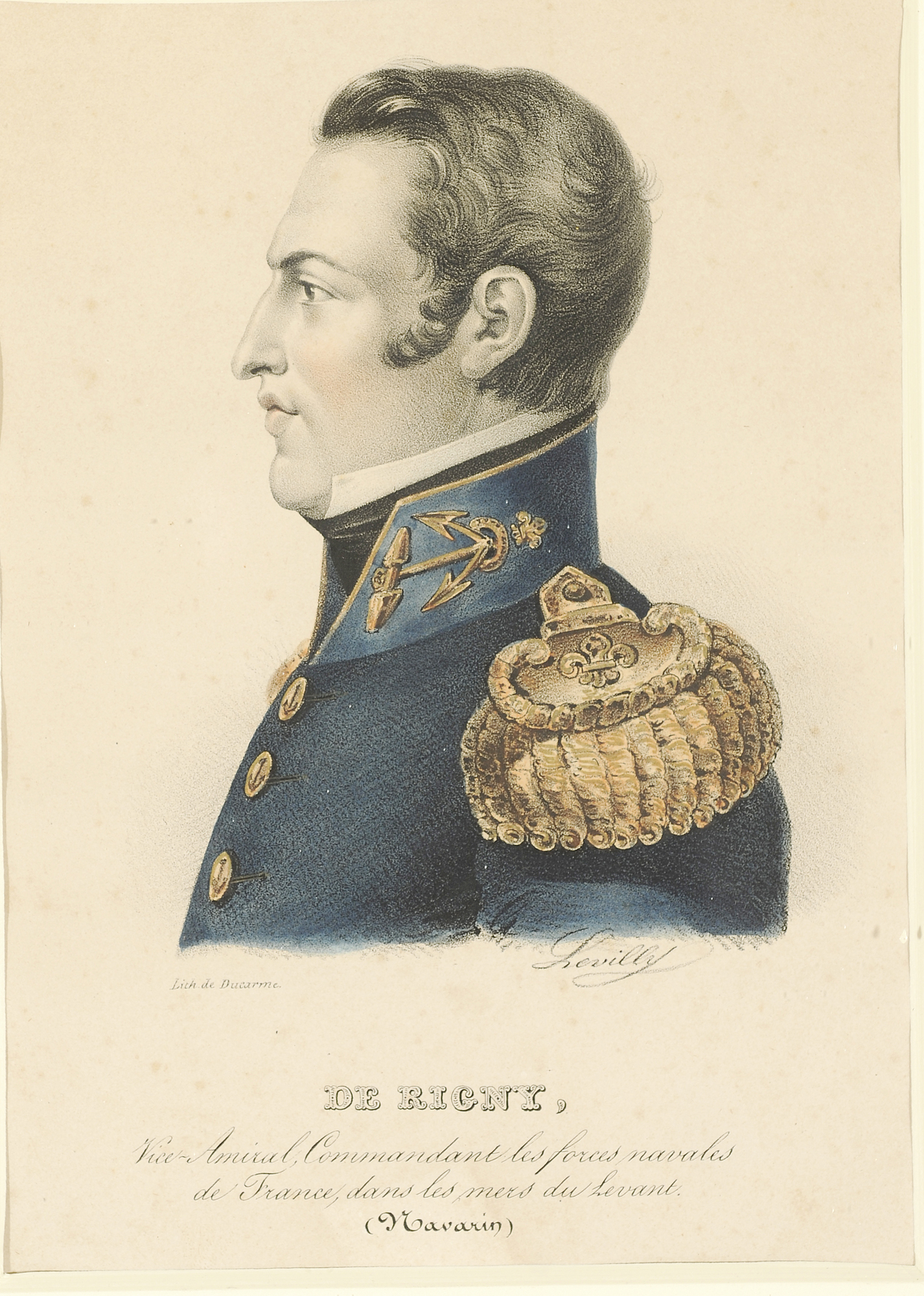
Henri de Rigny, Vice-Admiral, Commander of the naval forces of France, in the seas of the Levant (painted lithograph by Philéad Salvator Lévilly, National Historical Museum of Greece, Engraving Collection).

After spending several months in Special School in Brest, where he had been sent there to finish his studies, in 1798, he entered the navy as a midshipman with Admiral Étienne Eustache Bruix. In 1799 he was appointed midshipman.

He assisted in the blockade of Porto Ferrajo and the Battle of Algeciras, and then he made the Egyptian campaign, and took part in the Saint-Domingue expedition, Corsica and Spain. In 1803 he was appointed ensign and as such sent to the camp of Boulogne, he was responsible for commanding the corvette La Triomphante.

=== Land operations and campaigns ===
Interrogated by Napoleon about the tides for the invasion of England, the young sailor gave to the Emperor a response strong and concise. Embedded with the marines of the Guard in the Army in 1806 and 1807, he made in the course of two years these campaigns Prussia, Poland and Pomerania; fought at Jena, to Pułtusk, the siege of Stralsund and Graudentz, where he was wounded. Assigned to the army of Spain in 1808, he became aide-de-camp of Marshal Bessières; he distinguished himself at the Battle of Medina de Rioseco, and was wounded at the Battle of Somosierra, and he witnessed the capture of Madrid, in 1809, and the Battle of Wagram.

=== Commander of the French naval forces in the Levant ===
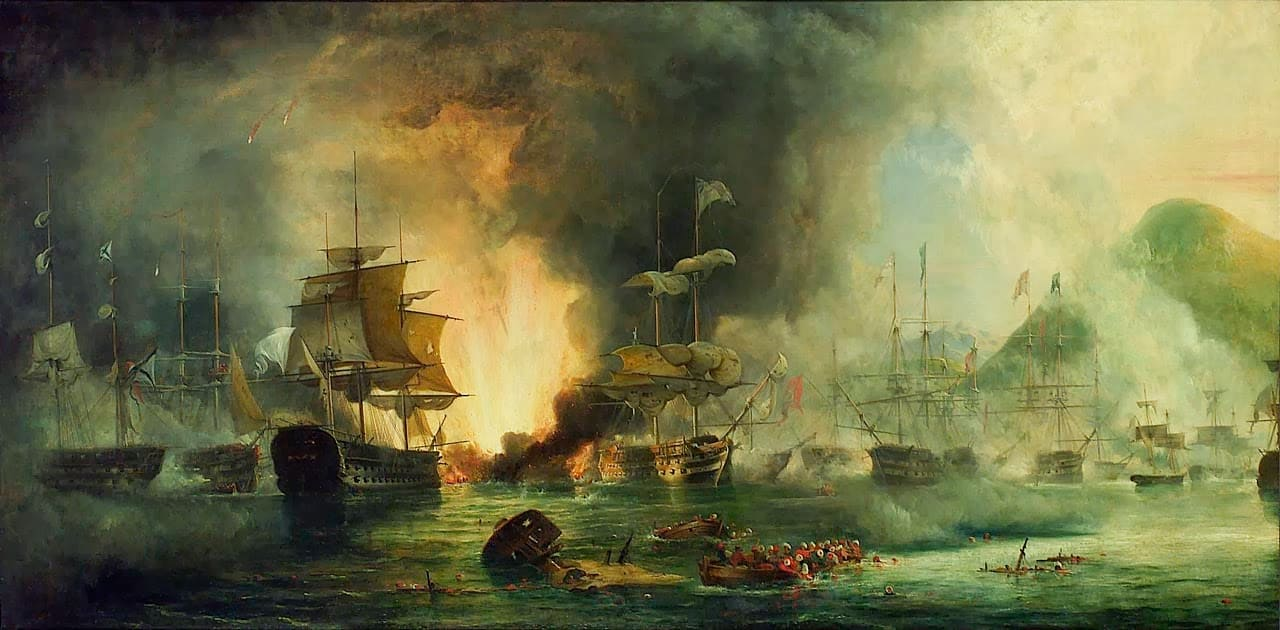
The Battle of Navarino by George Philip Reinagle. The Battle of Navarino on 20 October 1827.

In 1816, he was elevated to the rank of captain. In 1822 he received the command of the French naval forces assembled in the Levant (flagship the frigate Médée). He soon raised the French flag daily in these waters against the Greek and Turkish pirates, his intelligent care settled in the Archipelago Police navigation. He was appointed Admiral in 1825, and raised his pennant in his flagship Sirène. In September 1827 the French government tasked him with the enforcement of the joint resolution by France, Russia, and England, who had united to wrest Greece from the Turkish rule. He commanded the French fleet at the Battle of Navarino on 20 October 1827, which action earned him the Cross of the Order of the Bath, the Order of St. Alexander Nevsky, and promotion to Vice-Admiral.

An obelisk-shaped memorial dedicated to the victory of the Allied fleets and their three admirals, the French admiral Henri de Rigny, the British admiral Edward Codrington, and the Russian admiral Lodewijk van Heiden was later erected on the central square of Pylos. The monument was the work of the sculptor Thomas Thomopoulos (1873–1937) and its unveiling took place in 1930, although it was completed in 1933.

=== Return in France ===
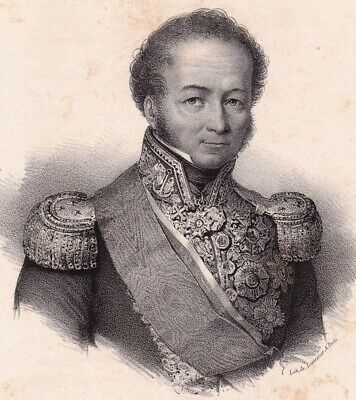
Henri de Rigny (lithography executed by Antoine Maurin in 1835)

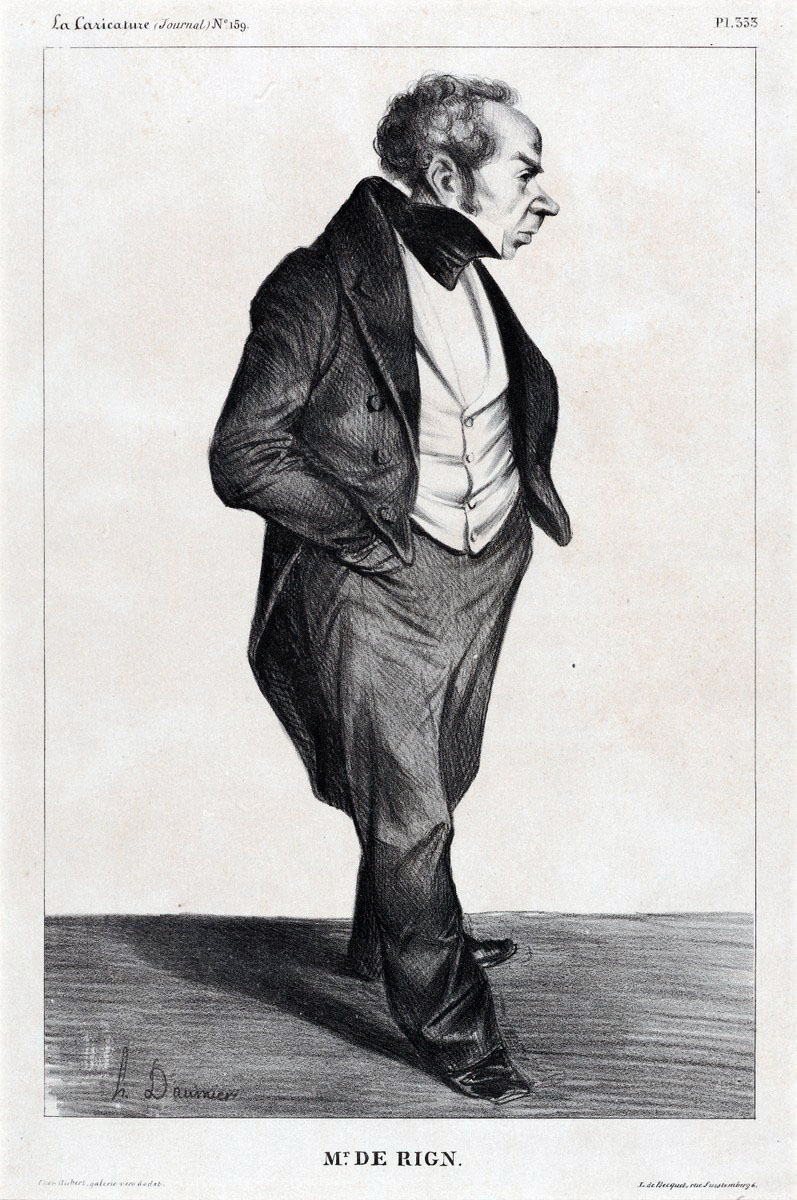
Caricature by Honoré Daumier, 1833.

Back in France after the evacuation of the Morea, which he chaired, the Admiral was appointed maritime prefect of Toulon in 1829. In 1829, king Charles X awarded him the title of Count of Rigny, but he refused until 8 August that year, the portfolio of the Navy in the Polignac ministry. Admiral Count Rigny went into the Levant to resume command of the fleet. Returning to Toulon for health reasons, in September 1830 he was appointed to the Board of Admiralty, and received the decoration of Grand Officier of the Legion of Honor.

Called in 1831 to the Chamber of Deputies by a double election, Admiral Rigny received, on 3 March that year, king Louis-Philippe, the portfolio of the navy. Assigned on 4 April 1834, the Department of Foreign Affairs, he started that administration of a new activity. On 12 March 1835 his health became increasingly unsteady, forcing him to resign his ministerial duties, but in August, he accepted a short mission to Naples. He was barely back in late October, when he felt the first attacks of which he succumbed on the night of 6 to 7 November 1835 at the age of 52 years. After his death, his widow gave birth to a daughter, Amelia Marie Gaultier Rigny, born on 7 February 1868. She married Baron Verneaux and died on 6 July 1868 at the Chateau de Ris Ris-Orangis. The Countess of Rigny, his mother also died at the Chateau de Ris on 13 November 1875.

=== Private life ===
On 17 September 1834 Henri de Rigny married Adele Defontaine Narcissus, of Mons (born 13 May 1803), widow in her first marriage to a wealthy Belgian businessman, Daniel Honnor Florent François (1780–1830), with whom she had two daughters: Elise (1826–1876), later Duchess of Padua by her marriage with Louis Arrighi de Casanova, and Leonie (1829–1892), later Marchioness of Talhouët by her marriage with Auguste de Talhouët-Roy.

== Honours ==
- Mount Rigny in Greenland, was named after him.
- Streets in Paris, Nancy, Toul, Saint-Amand-Longpré, Arc-lès-Gray, in France were named after him.
- A street in Athens, Greece was named after him.
- A memorial monument on the central square of Pylos in Greece was dedicated to him (work of the Greek sculptor Thomas Thomopoulos (1873–1937), unveiled in 1930, although it was completed in 1933).
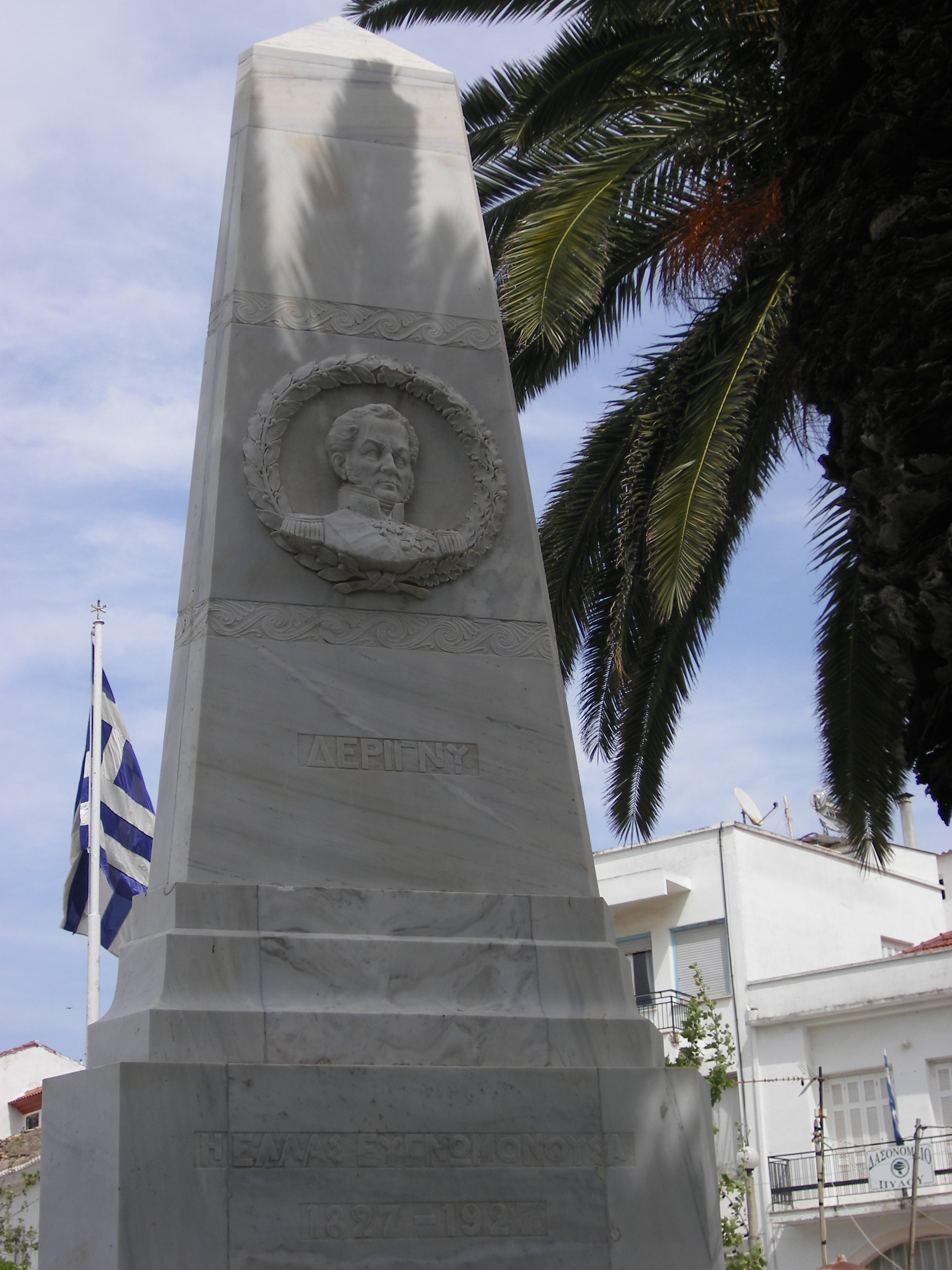
Memorial monument dedicated to the three admirals of the Battle of Navarino on the central square of Pylos de Rigny (ΔΕΡΙΓΝΥ)

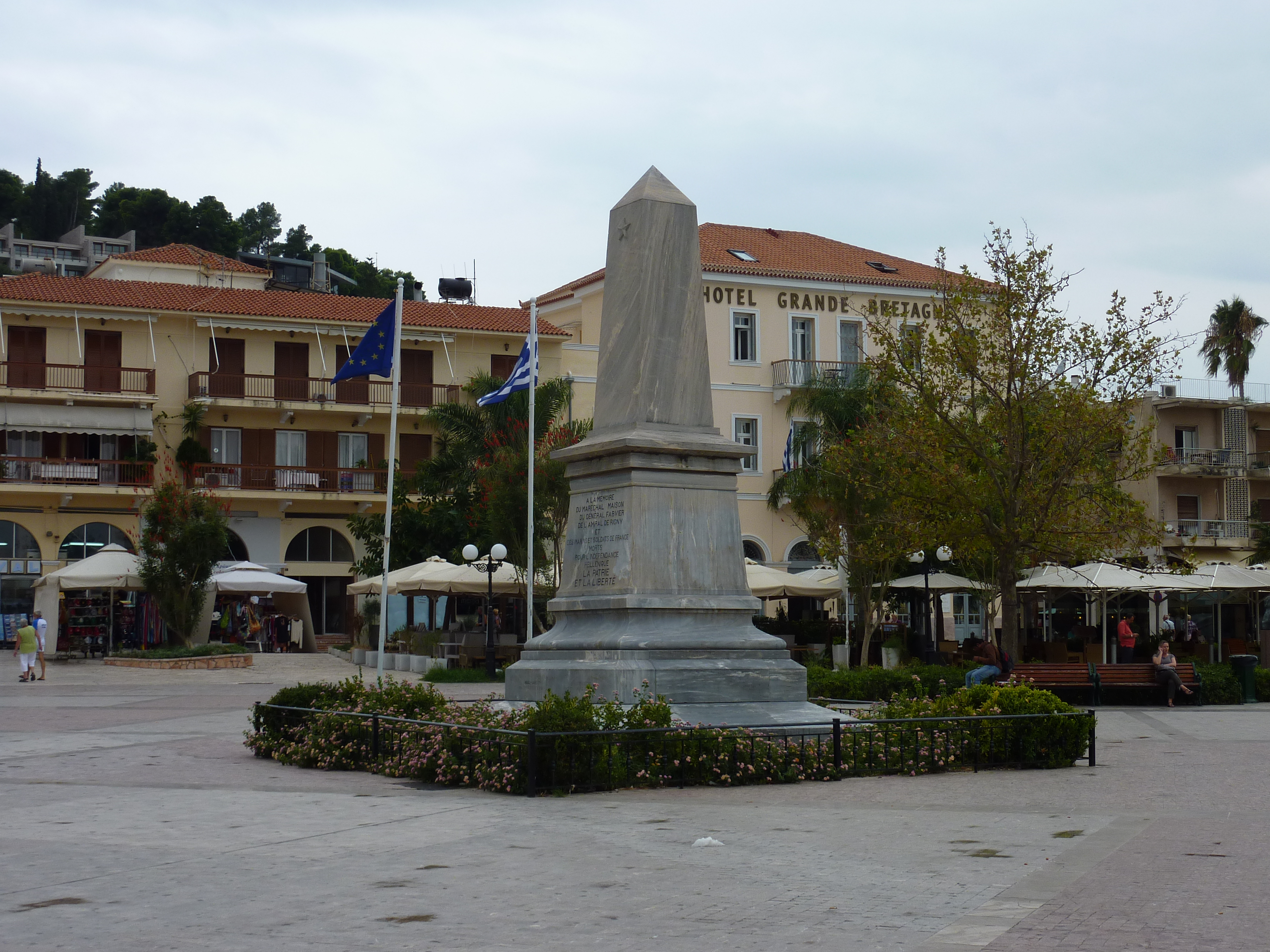
Philhellenes Monument (Nafplion)

Political offices
Preceded by Jean-Guillaume, baron Hyde de Neuville	Minister of the Marine; 8 August 1829 - 23 August 1829	Succeeded by Charles Lemercier de Longpré, baron d'Haussez
Preceded by Charles Lemercier de Longpré, baron d'Haussez	Minister of the Marine; 31 July 1830 - 11 August 1830	Succeeded by Horace Sébastiani
Preceded by Édouard Adolphe Casimir Joseph Mortier	French minister of War; 12 March 1835 - 30 April 1835	Succeeded by Nicolas Joseph Maison
