= Antoine Lefebvre de Vatimesnil =

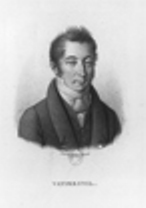
- Born: 19 December 1789; Rouen, Seine-Inférieure, France
- Died: 10 October 1860 (aged 70); Sainte-Marie-de-Vatimesnil, Eure, France
- Occupations: Lawyer and politician

Antoine François Henri Lefebvre de Vatimesnil (19 December 1789 – 10 October 1860) was a French lawyer and politician. He was a deputy from 1828 to 1834, Minister of Public Education from 1828 to 1829, and a Representative in 1849.

== Early years ==
Antoine François Henri Lefebvre de Vatimesnil was born in Rouen, Seine-Inférieure, on 19 December 1789. His father was Pierre Henri Lefebvre de Vatimesnil, a deputy from 1820 to 1827. Antoine Lefebvre was admitted to the bar in 1810. He was named auditor counselor to the court of Paris in 1812, deputy prosecutor at the court of the Seine in 1815, assistant procurer general at the court of Paris in 1817, and first assistant procurer general at the court of peers on 22 February 1821. In these functions he was involved in several political trials, notably that against Béranger, which made him noticed.

In 1822 Pierre-Denis, Comte de Peyronnet, appointed Vatimesnil Secretary General to the Ministry of Justice. He was a Councilor of State and Advocate General at the Court of Cassation in 1824. He was elected to represent Corsica on 3 January 1828, but his election was cancelled since he was not old enough to serve as a deputy.

== Minister of Education ==
On 1 February 1828 Vatimesnil was named by royal decree Minister of State and Minister of Education in the Ministry of Jean-Baptiste de Martignac, despite not being a member of either House due to his age. His appointment caused protests, and he was accused of being "affiliated with the congregations and imbued with their mysterious doctrines". To the surprise of his critics, his first circular recommended freedom of conscience, and development of primary education. He made important changes in his department, introducing the study of modern languages in schools and improving the pay of teachers. His main concern was the conditions of primary teachers, who offered him a medal when he retired in 1829.

Vatimesnil also reorganized the École Normale, created a chair of international law at the Faculty of Law of Paris, restored the chair of administrative Law and approved the foundation of the École Centrale. He spoke in the Chambers in defense of the ordinances of 16 June 1828 which submitted the ecclesiastical educational establishments to the university system. He left power when the cabinet fell in August 1829 and returned to the practice of law.

== Later career ==
Vatimesnil was elected deputy for Cantal (Saint-Flour) and for Nord (Valenciennes) on 23 June 1830. He chose to represent Valenciennes. After the July Revolution of 1830 he voted with the House in favor of the lieutenant-general of the kingdom handing over to the Duke of Orleans. He was rapporteur of the new electoral law. Vatimesnil was reelected for Valenciennes on 5 July 1831. He spoke against divorce and was rapporteur of the budget of the judiciary. He did not stand for election in 1834.

Vatimesnil returned to his career as an advocate. He became counsel for many religious congregations and was vice-president of the electoral committee of religious freedom in 1843. He twice refused the peerage, which was offered to him through Villemain and Montalembert. After the February Revolution of 1848, on 13 May 1849 he was elected as Representative of Eure in the Legislature. He was one of the leaders of the monarchist majority. He protested after the coup d'état of 2 December 1851, and was detained for a few days at Fort Mont-Valérien before returning to private life.

Vatimesnil signed a protest against the decrees of 22 January 1852 that confiscated the property of the Orleans family. He returned to Sainte-Marie-de-Vatimesnil and represented his canton of Etrépagny in the General Council of the Eure until his death. He died in Vatimesnil on 10 October 1860, aged 70.

== Works ==
- Translation of the treatise De la clémence by Sénèque (1832).
- Lettre to R. P. de Ravignan sur l'état légal en France des associations religieuses non autorisées (1844).
- Mémoire sur les décrets de 1852 sur les biens de la famille d'0rléans (1852).
- Mémoire pour le comte de Chambord et la duchesse de Parme agissant en qualité d'héritiers du duc de Berry
