= Ministry of Jules de Polignac =

French government ministry from 1829–1830

- Cabinet of France

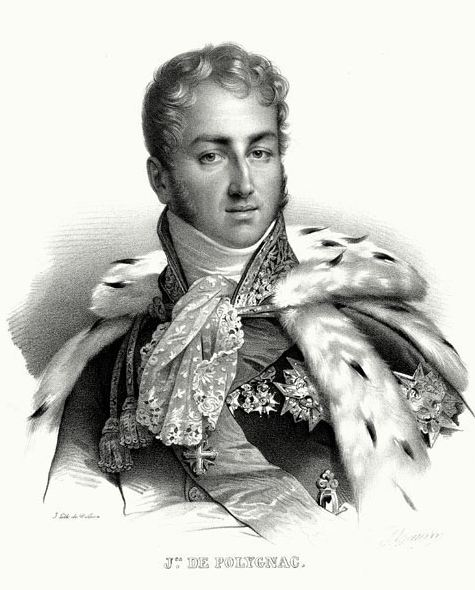
- Jules de Polignac
- Date formed: 8 August 1829
- Date dissolved: 29 July 1830

People and organisations
- Head of state: Charles X of France
- Head of government: Jules de Polignac

History
- Predecessor: Ministry of Jean-Baptiste de Martignac
- Successor: Ministry of Casimir de Rochechouart de Mortemart

The Ministry of Jules de Polignac was formed on 8 August 1829 in the last year of the reign of King Charles X of France. It was dissolved on 29 July 1830 during the July Revolution and replaced by the Ministry of Casimir de Rochechouart de Mortemart.

== Ministers ==
Jules de Polignac countersigned the ordinance of 8 August 1829 that named the ministers, but was not formally made president of the council of ministers until 17 November 1829. The ministers were:

Portfolio	Holder	Party
President of the Council of Ministers	The Prince of Polignac	Ultras
Ministers
Minister of Foreign Affairs	The Prince of Polignac	Ultras
Minister of Finance	The Count of Chambrol	Conservative
Minister of the Interior	François-Régis de La Bourdonnaye	Conservative
Minister of Justice	Jean de Courvoisier	Conservative
Minister of War	Marshal Count of Bourmont	Ultras
Minister of the Navy and Colonies	Admiral Count of Rigny	None
Minister of Public Education and Worship	The Count of Montbel	Ultras
Minister of Public Works	The Baron Capelle	Ultras

== Changes ==
On 18 November 1829:

Portfolio	Holder	Party
Minister of the Interior	The Count of Montbel	Ultras
Minister of Public Education and Worship	Martial de Guernon-Ranville	Ultras

On 23 August 1829:

Portfolio	Holder	Party
Minister of the Navy and Colonies	Charles Lemercier de Longpré	Ultras

On 19 May 1830:

Portfolio	Holder	Party
Minister of Finance	The Count of Montbel	Ultras
Minister of the Interior	The Count of Peyronnet	Ultras
Minister of Justice	Jean de Chantelauze	Conservative
