= Georges Mouton =

French soldier and political figure

Marshal of France Georges Mouton Count of Lobau
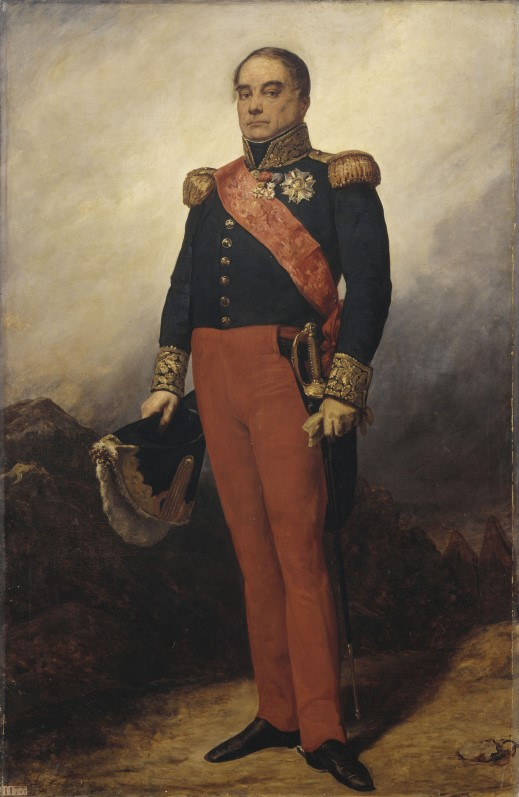
- Portrait by Ary Scheffer, 1835
- Born: 21 February 1770; Phalsbourg, Lorraine and Barrois, France
- Died: 27 November 1838 (aged 68); Paris, France
- Military career
- Allegiance: France
- Branch: French Army
- Service years: 1792–1838
- Rank: Maréchal de France
- Commands: VI Infantry Corps
- Wars: War of the First Coalition; War of the Fourth Coalition; War of the Fifth Coalition; French invasion of Russia; War of the Sixth Coalition; Hundred Days; June Rebellion

Georges Mouton, comte de Lobau (French pronunciation: [ʒɔʁʒ mutɔ̃ də lobo]; 21 February 1770 – 27 November 1838) was a French soldier and political figure who rose to the rank of Marshal of France.

== Biography ==
Born in Phalsbourg, Lorraine and Barrois, he enlisted in the French Revolutionary Army in 1792. Serving in the early campaigns of the French Revolutionary Wars, he was promoted to the rank of colonel by 1800.

He was promoted to général de brigade in 1805, after the establishment of the French Empire, and to général de division in 1807. Mouton distinguished himself in the battles of Jena, Landshut and Aspern-Essling. In 1810, he was created count of Lobau in recognition of his role in the battle of Aspern.

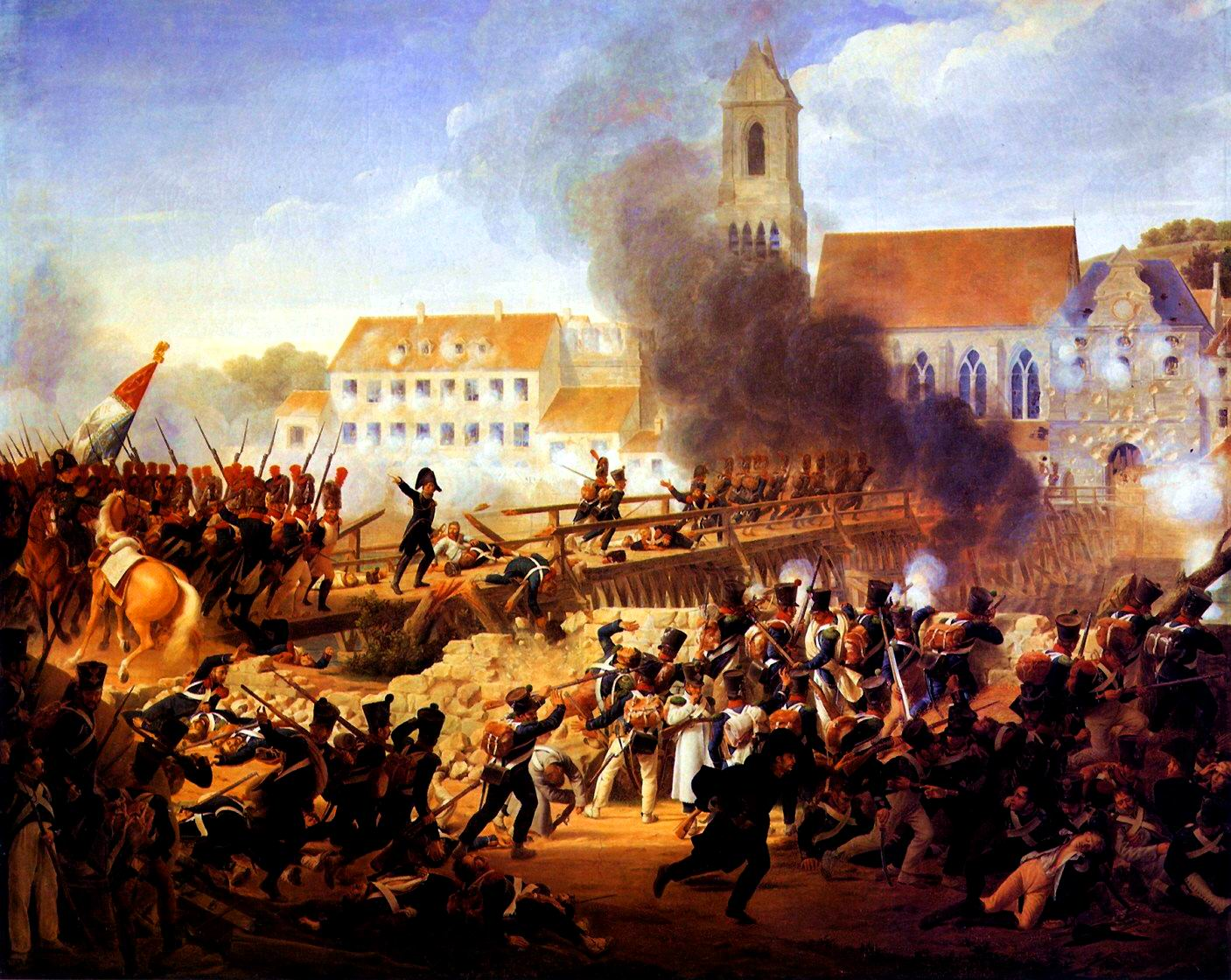
Mouton led the attack across the bridge at Landshut on 21 April 1809

During the Russian Campaign, he acted as a senior aide-de-camp to Emperor Napoleon I of France. He then served with distinction during the 1813 campaign, seeing action at the Battles of Lützen and Bautzen.

After Dominique Vandamme was made prisoner during the battle of Kulm, Lobau commanded the retreat of the remnants of the corps. He served under Laurent Gouvion Saint-Cyr when, upon the retreat after the battle of Leipzig, the latter was trapped in Dresden and after the surrender of these forces he became a prisoner of the Austrian Empire for the rest of the war.

During the Hundred Days, Mouton rallied to Napoleon and was made commander of the VI Infantry Corps which he led in the battles of Ligny and Waterloo. At the Battle of Waterloo he distinguished himself in the defense of Plancenoit against the Prussians.

After the Second Restoration, Lobau was forced to go into exile until he was allowed to return to France in 1818. He was elected to the House of Representatives from 1828 to 1830 as a liberal, and, in 1830, he joined the July Revolution as commander of the National Guard.

As a reward for his services to King Louis-Philippe he was made a Marshal in 1831. He was also made a Peer of France in 1833. In 1832 and 1834, Lobau was assigned to suppress insurrections, a task in which he was successful.

Mouton died in Paris in 1838 as a result of an old wound.
