= July Ordinances =

1830 authoritarian decrees by King Charles X of France

The July Ordinances, also known as the Four Ordinances of Saint-Cloud, were a series of decrees set forth by Charles X and Jules Armand de Polignac, the chief minister, in July 1830.

Compelled by what he felt to be a growing, manipulative radicalism in the newly elected government, Charles felt that as king by right of birth, his primary duty was the guarantee of order and happiness in France and its people.

The result was that on 9 July 1830, Charles announced that in his interpretation of, and in full compliance with, Article 14 of the Charter of 1814, he would henceforth govern by ordonnances. On 25 July, while a guest at Saint-Cloud, he signed the so-called "July Ordinances" which were published in the Parisian newspaper Moniteur the following day.

The ordinances of 26 July:

- Suspended the liberty of the press
- Appointed new, reactionary Councillors of State
- Dissolved the newly elected Chamber of Deputies of France
- Reduced the number of deputies in future Chambers
- Summoned new electoral colleges for September of that year
- Withdrew the Deputies' right of amendment
- Excluded the commercial middle-class from future elections

They were intended to restore the previous political order. However, the ordinances had the opposite effect of angering the French citizens. Journalists gathered to protest at the headquarters of the National daily, founded in January 1830 by Adolphe Thiers, Armand Carrel, and others. The final result was the July Revolution and Charles X's abdication and exile.

== See also ==
- Press freedom under the Restoration
