= Minister of War (France) =

Position in French government

- Ministre de la guerre
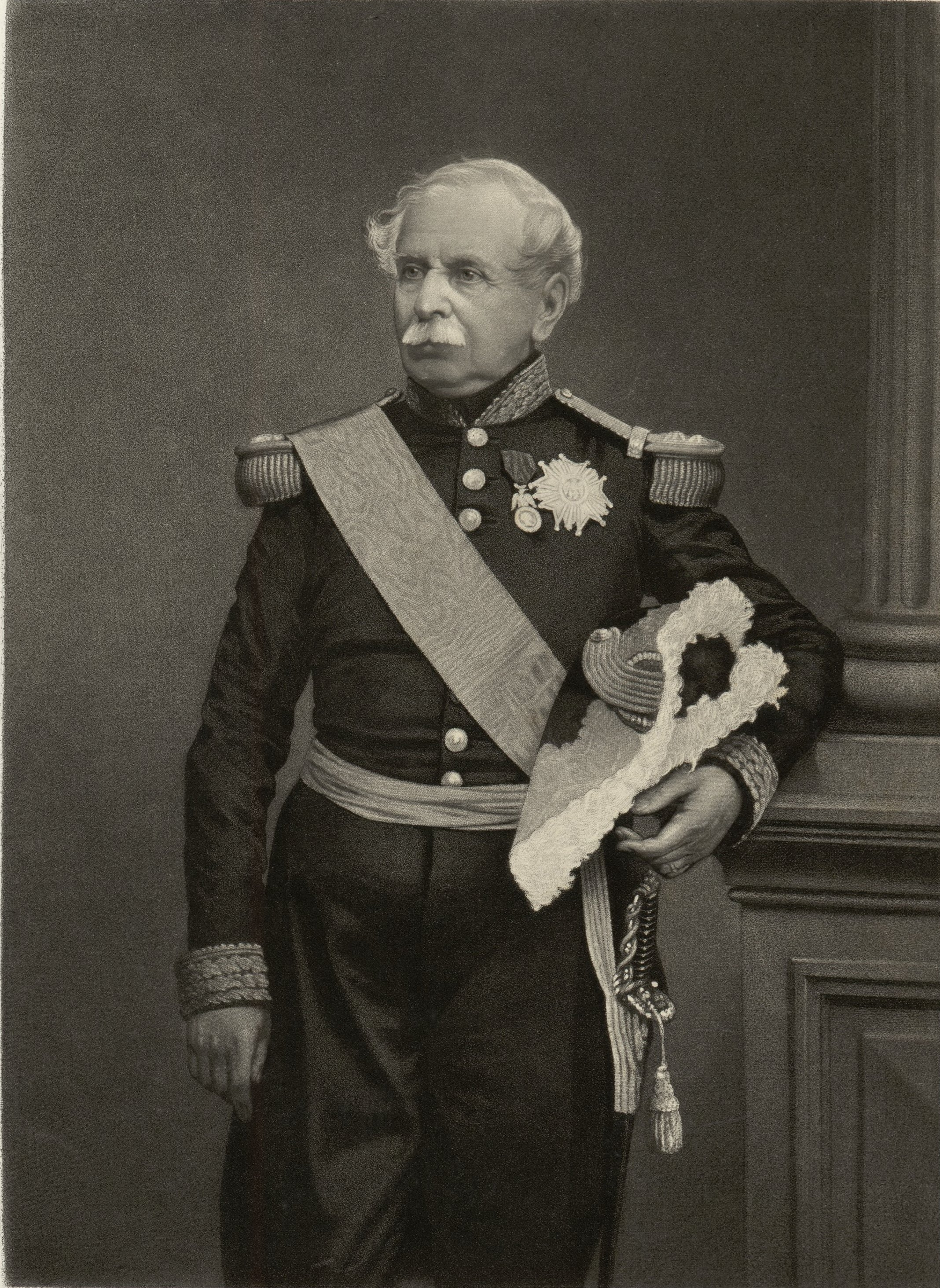
- Longest serving Jacques Randon; 5 May 1859 – 20 January 1867
- Ministry of War
- Status: Abolished
- Member of: Government: Council of Ministers
- Reports to: Prime Minister
- Nominator: Prime Minister
- Appointer: President
- Term length: No fixed term
- Precursor: Secretary of State for War
- Formation: 25 May 1791
- First holder: Louis Lebègue Duportail
- Final holder: Paul Coste-Floret
- Abolished: 31 October 1947
- Succession: Minister of the Armed Forces

The Minister of War (French: Ministre de la guerre) was the leader and most senior official of the French Ministry of War. It was a position in the Government of France from 1791 to 1947, replacing the position of Secretary of State for War and later being merged with the offices of Minister of the Navy and Minister of Air to form a new Minister of the Armed Forces.

== History ==
In 1791, during the French Revolution, the Secretary of State for War became titled Minister of War.

For most of its existence and until the beginning of the 20th century, ministers had always been Marshals or Generals. The Third Republic saw the gradual replacement of the military by civilian politicians to the office. It was also subject to the governmental instability of the regime, leading to ministers seating only for few days.

== Powers and functions ==
On 27 April 1791, the National Constituent Assembly issued a decree organizing the six ministries of Justice, Interior, Finances, War, Navy and Foreign Affairs. The decree was signed into law on 25 May 1791 by King Louis XVI. This law determined the responsibilities of the minister, giving him full authority on the French Army and the sole provost duties of the National Gendarmerie. It also resolved that the minister would be responsible for the administration and finances of his department.

== Officeholders ==
=== Kingdom of France ===
No.	Portrait	Name	Term			Cabinet	King	Ref.
No.	Portrait	Name	Took office	Left office	Time in office	Cabinet	King	Ref.
Ministry established
1		Louis Lebègue Duportail	25 May 1791	7 December 1791	196 days	Louis XVI	Louis XVI	(Note: Secretary of State for War at the creation of the ministry.)
2		Louis de Narbonne-Lara	7 December 1791	10 March 1792	94 days	Louis XVI	Louis XVI	
3		Pierre Marie de Grave	10 March 1792	10 May 1792	61 days	Louis XVI	Louis XVI	
4		Joseph Servan	10 May 1792	13 June 1792	34 days	Louis XVI	Louis XVI	
5		Charles François Dumouriez	13 June 1792	18 June 1792	5 days	Louis XVI	Louis XVI	
6		Pierre de Lajard	18 June 1792	23 July 1792	35 days	Louis XVI	Louis XVI	
7		Charles d'Abancourt	23 July 1792	10 August 1792	18 days	Louis XVI	Louis XVI	
8		Joseph Servan	10 August 1792	22 September 1792	43 days	Louis XVI	Louis XVI	

=== First Republic ===
No.	Portrait	Name	Term (Note: Dates in italic correspond to the French Republican calendar, used between 1793 (and retroactively 1792) and 1805.)			Cabinet	Head of State	Ref.
No.	Portrait	Name	Took office	Left office	Time in office	Cabinet	Head of State	Ref.
8		Joseph Servan	22 September 1792; 1 Vendémiaire Year I	3 October 1792; 12 Vendémiaire Year I	11 days	National Convention	National Convention	(Note: Remained in office at the proclamation of the Republic.)
Interim by Pierre Lebrun-Tondu, Minister of Foreign Affairs, from 3 October 1792 to 24 January 1793.								
9		Jean-Nicolas Pache	24 January 1793; 5 Pluviôse Year I	4 February 1793; 16 Pluviôse Year I	11 days	National Convention	National Convention	
10		Pierre Riel de Beurnonville	4 February 1793; 16 Pluviôse Year I	4 April 1793; 15 Germinal Year I	59 days	National Convention	National Convention	
11		Jean Bouchotte	4 April 1793; 15 Germinal Year I	20 April 1794; 1 Floréal Year II	1 year, 16 days	National Convention	National Convention	
All ministries suspended and replaced by the Executive Commissions between 20 April 1794 and 3 November 1795.								
12		Jean-Baptiste Aubert du Bayet	3 November 1795; 12 Brumaire Year IV	8 February 1796; 19 Pluviôse Year IV	97 days	Directory	Directory	
13		Claude Petiet	8 February 1796; 19 Pluviôse Year IV	23 July 1797; 5 Thermidor Year V	1 year, 165 days	Directory	Directory	
14		Barthélemy Schérer	23 July 1797; 5 Thermidor Year V	21 February 1799; 3 Ventôse Year VII	1 year, 213 days	Directory	Directory	
15		Louis de Milet de Mureau	21 February 1799; 3 Ventôse Year VII	2 July 1799; 14 Messidor Year VII	131 days	Directory	Directory	
16		Jean-Baptiste Bernadotte	2 July 1799; 14 Messidor Year VII	14 September 1799; 28 Fructidor Year VII	74 days	Directory	Directory	
17		Edmond Dubois-Crancé	14 September 1799; 28 Fructidor Year VII	7 November 1799; 16 Brumaire Year VIII	54 days	Directory	Directory	
18		Louis-Alexandre Berthier	7 November 1799; 16 Brumaire Year VIII	2 April 1800; 12 Germinal Year VIII	146 days	Consulate	Napoléon Bonaparte	
19		Lazare Carnot	2 April 1800; 12 Germinal Year VIII	5 May 1800; 16 Floréal Year VIII	33 days	Consulate	Napoléon Bonaparte	
Interim by Jean-Gérard Lacuée, Councillor of State, from 5 May to 8 October 1800.								
20		Louis-Alexandre Berthier	8 October 1800; 16 Vendémiaire Year IX	18 May 1804; 28 Floréal Year XII	3 years, 223 days	Consulate	Napoléon Bonaparte	

=== First Empire ===
No.	Portrait	Name	Term			Cabinet	Emperor	Ref.
No.	Portrait	Name	Took office	Left office	Time in office	Cabinet	Emperor	Ref.
20		Louis-Alexandre Berthier; Prince de Neuchâtel	18 May 1804	9 August 1807	3 years, 83 days	Napoléon	Napoleon	(Note: Remained in office at the proclamation of the Empire.)
21		Henri Guillaume Clarke; Duc de Feltre	9 August 1807	20 November 1813	6 years, 103 days	Napoléon	Napoleon	
22		Pierre Daru; Comte Daru	20 November 1813	1 April 1814	132 days	Napoléon	Napoleon	

=== Restoration ===
No.	Portrait	Name	Term			Cabinet	King	Ref.
No.	Portrait	Name	Took office	Left office	Time in office	Cabinet	King	Ref.
23		Pierre Antoine; Comte Dupont de l'Étang	3 April 1814	26 November 1814	237 days	Provisional Government	Louis XVIII	
23		Pierre Antoine; Comte Dupont de l'Étang	3 April 1814	26 November 1814	237 days	Restoration	Louis XVIII	
24		Jean-de-Dieu Soult; Duc de Dalmatie	26 November 1814	11 March 1815	105 days	Restoration	Louis XVIII	(Note: Soult, as Minister of War, started countersigning the ordinance of Louis XVIII on 26 November 1814.)
25		Henri Guillaume Clarke; Duc de Feltre	11 March 1815	20 March 1815	9 days	Restoration	Louis XVIII	

=== Hundred Days ===
No.	Portrait	Name	Term			Cabinet	Emperor	Ref.
No.	Portrait	Name	Took office	Left office	Time in office	Cabinet	Emperor	Ref.
26		Louis Nicolas d'Avout; Duc d'Auerstaedt, Prince d'Eckmühl	20 March 1815	9 July 1815	111 days	Hundred Days	Napoleon I	
26		Louis Nicolas d'Avout; Duc d'Auerstaedt, Prince d'Eckmühl	20 March 1815	9 July 1815	111 days	Executive Commission	Napoleon II	

=== Kingdom of France ===
No.	Portrait	Name	Term			Cabinet	King	Ref.
No.	Portrait	Name	Took office	Left office	Time in office	Cabinet	King	Ref.
27		Laurent de Gouvion; Marquis de Saint-Cyr	9 July 1815	28 September 1815	81 days	Talleyrand	Louis XVIII	
28		Henri Guillaume Clarke; Duc de Feltre	28 September 1815	12 September 1817	1 year, 349 days	de Richelieu I	Louis XVIII	
29		Laurent de Gouvion; Marquis de Saint-Cyr	12 September 1817	19 November 1819	2 years, 68 days	de Richelieu I Dessolles	Louis XVIII	
30		Victor de Faÿ; Marquis de La Tour-Maubourg	19 November 1819	14 December 1821	2 years, 25 days	Decazes de Richelieu II	Louis XVIII	
31		Claude Victor Perrin; Duc de Bellune	14 December 1821	23 March 1823	1 year, 99 days	de Villèle	Louis XVIII	
Interim by Alexandre Elisabeth Michel, Vicomte Digeon, from 23 March to 15 April 1823.								
32		Claude Victor Perrin; Duc de Bellune	15 April 1823	19 October 1823	187 days	de Villèle	Louis XVIII	
33		Ange Hyacinthe Maxence; Baron de Damas	19 October 1823	4 August 1824	175 days	de Villèle	Louis XVIII	
34		Aimé Marie Gaspard; Comte de Clermont-Tonnerre	4 August 1824	4 January 1828	3 years, 268 days	de Villèle	Louis XVIII	
34		Aimé Marie Gaspard; Comte de Clermont-Tonnerre	4 August 1824	4 January 1828	3 years, 268 days	de Villèle	Charles X	
35		Louis Victor de Caux; Vicomte de Blacquetot	4 January 1828	8 August 1829	1 year, 216 days	de Martignac	Charles X	
36		Louis Auguste Victor; Comte de Ghaisnes de Bourmont	8 August 1829	29 July 1830	355 days	de Polignac	Charles X	
37		Étienne Maurice; Comte Gérard	29 July 1830	17 November 1830	115 days	de Rochechouart de Mortemart; Paris Municipal Commission Cabinet; Provisional cabinet First cabinet	Charles X	
37		Étienne Maurice; Comte Gérard	29 July 1830	17 November 1830	115 days	de Rochechouart de Mortemart; Paris Municipal Commission Cabinet; Provisional cabinet First cabinet	Louis Philippe I	
38		Jean-de-Dieu Soult; Duc de Dalmatie	17 November 1830	18 July 1834	3 years, 243 days	Laffitte; Casimir-Périer; Soult I	Louis Philippe I	
39		Étienne Maurice; Comte Gérard	18 July 1834	10 November 1834	115 days	Gérard	Louis Philippe I	
40		Simon Bernard; Général-Baron	10 November 1834	18 November 1834	8 days	Maret	Louis Philippe I	
41		Édouard Mortier; Duc de Trévise	18 November 1834	12 March 1835	114 days	Mortier	Louis Philippe I	
Interim by Henri de Rigny, Minister without portfolio, from 12 March to 30 April 1835.								
42		Nicolas Joseph; Marquis Maison	30 April 1835	19 September 1836	1 year, 142 days	de Broglie; Thiers I	Louis Philippe I	
Interim by Claude du Campe de Rosamel, Minister of Navy, from 6 September to 19 September 1836.								
43		Simon Bernard; Général-Baron	19 September 1836	31 March 1839	2 years, 193 days	Molé I – II	Louis Philippe I	
44		Amédée Despans-Cubières	31 March 1839	12 May 1839	42 days	Transitional cabinet	Louis Philippe I	
45		Antoine Schneider	12 May 1839	1 March 1840	294 days	Soult II	Louis Philippe I	
46		Amédée Despans-Cubières	1 March 1840	29 October 1840	242 days	Thiers II	Louis Philippe I	
47		Jean-de-Dieu Soult; Duc de Dalmatie	29 October 1840	10 November 1845	5 years, 12 days	Soult III	Louis Philippe I	
48		Alexandre Moline de Saint-Yon	10 November 1845	9 May 1847	1 year, 180 days	Soult III	Louis Philippe I	
49		Camille Trézel	9 May 1847	24 February 1848	291 days	Soult III; Guizot	Louis Philippe I	

=== Second Republic ===
No.	Portrait	Name	Term			Cabinet	President	Ref.
No.	Portrait	Name	Took office	Left office	Time in office	Cabinet	President	Ref.
50		Alphonse Bedeau	24 February 1848	25 February 1848	1 day	Provisional Government	Provisional Government	
51		Jacques Subervie	25 February 1848	19 March 1848	23 days	Provisional Government	Provisional Government	
Interim by François Arago, Minister of Navy, from 19 March to 20 March 1848.								
52		Louis-Eugène Cavaignac	20 March 1848	5 April 1848	16 days	Provisional Government	Provisional Government	
53		François Arago	5 April 1848	11 May 1848	42 days	Executive Commission	Executive Commission	
Interim by Jean-Baptiste Charras, Under Secretary of State of War, from 11 May to 17 May 1848.								
54		Louis-Eugène Cavaignac	17 May 1848	28 June 1848	42 days	Executive Commission	Executive Commission	
55		Louis Juchault de Lamoricière	28 June 1848	20 December 1848	175 days	Cavaignac	Louis-Eugène Cavaignac (Note: As Chief of the Executive Power.)	
56		Joseph Rullière	20 December 1848	31 October 1849	315 days	Barrot I – II	Louis-Napoléon Bonaparte	
57		Alphonse d'Hautpoul	31 October 1849	22 October 1850	356 days	d'Hautpoul	Louis-Napoléon Bonaparte	
58		Jean-Paul de Schramm	22 October 1850	9 January 1851	79 days	d'Hautpoul	Louis-Napoléon Bonaparte	
59		Auguste Regnaud de Saint-Jean d'Angély	9 January 1851	24 January 1851	15 days	d'Hautpoul	Louis-Napoléon Bonaparte	
60		Jacques Randon	24 January 1851	26 October 1851	275 days	Rouher; Faucher	Louis-Napoléon Bonaparte	
61		Jacques Leroy de Saint-Arnaud	26 October 1851	2 December 1852	1 year, 37 days	Last cabinet Napoléon I – II	Louis-Napoléon Bonaparte	

=== Second Empire ===
No.	Portrait	Name	Term			Cabinet	Emperor	Ref.
No.	Portrait	Name	Took office	Left office	Time in office	Cabinet	Emperor	Ref.
61		Jacques Leroy de Saint-Arnaud	2 December 1852	11 March 1854	1 year, 99 days	Napoléon III	Napoleon III	
62		Jean-Baptiste Philibert; Comte Vaillant	11 March 1854	5 May 1859	5 years, 55 days	Napoléon III	Napoleon III	
63		Jacques Louis César Alexandre; Comte Randon	5 May 1859	20 January 1867	7 years, 260 days	Napoléon III	Napoleon III	
64		Adolphe Niel	20 January 1867	13 August 1869†	2 years, 205 days	Napoléon III	Napoleon III	
Interim by Charles Rigault de Genouilly, Minister of Navy, from 13 August to 21 August 1869.								
65		Edmond Le Bœuf	21 August 1869	19 July 1870	332 days	Napoléon IV; Ollivier	Napoleon III	
Interim by Charles Dejean, Councillor of State, from 19 July to 9 August 1870.								
66		Charles Cousin-Montauban; Comte de Palikao	9 August 1870	4 September 1870	26 days	Cousin-Montauban	Napoleon III	

=== Third Republic ===
No.	Portrait	Name	Term			Cabinet	President	Ref.
No.	Portrait	Name	Took office	Left office	Time in office	Cabinet	President	Ref.
67		Adolphe Le Flô	4 September 1870	5 June 1871	274 days	National Defence; Dufaure I	Jules Trochu (Note: President of the Government of National Defence.)	
67		Adolphe Le Flô	4 September 1870	5 June 1871	274 days	National Defence; Dufaure I	Adolphe Thiers	
68		Ernest de Cissey	5 June 1871	29 May 1873	1 year, 358 days	Dufaure I – II	Adolphe Thiers	
69		François du Barail	29 May 1873	22 May 1874	358 days	de Broglie I – II	Patrice de MacMahon	
70		Ernest de Cissey	22 May 1874	15 August 1876	2 years, 85 days	de Cissey; Buffet; Dufaure III – IV	Patrice de MacMahon	
71		Jean Berthaut	15 August 1876	23 November 1877	1 year, 100 days	Dufaure IV; Simon de Broglie III	Patrice de MacMahon	
72		Gaëtan de Rochebouët	23 November 1877	13 December 1877	20 days	de Rochebouët	Patrice de MacMahon	
73		Jean-Louis Borel	13 December 1877	13 January 1879	1 year, 31 days	Dufaure V	Patrice de MacMahon	
74		Henri Gresley	13 January 1879	28 December 1879	349 days	Dufaure V Waddington	Patrice de MacMahon	
74		Henri Gresley	13 January 1879	28 December 1879	349 days	Dufaure V Waddington	Jules Grévy	
75		Jean-Joseph Farre	28 December 1879	14 November 1881	1 year, 260 days	Waddington de Freycinet I Ferry I	Jules Grévy	
76		Jean-Baptiste Campenon	14 November 1881	30 January 1882	77 days	Gambetta	Jules Grévy	
77		Jean-Baptiste Billot	30 January 1882	31 January 1883	1 year, 1 day	de Freycinet II; Duclerc	Jules Grévy	
78		Jean Thibaudin	31 January 1883	9 October 1883	251 days	Fallières; Ferry II	Jules Grévy	
79		Jean-Baptiste Campenon	9 October 1883	3 January 1885	1 year, 86 days	Ferry II	Jules Grévy	
80		Jules Lewal	3 January 1885	6 April 1885	36 days	Ferry II	Jules Grévy	
81		Jean-Baptiste Campenon	6 April 1885	7 January 1886	276 days	Brisson I	Jules Grévy	
82		Georges Boulanger	7 January 1886	30 May 1887	1 year, 143 days	de Freycinet III; Goblet	Jules Grévy	
83		Théophile Ferron	30 May 1887	12 December 1887	196 days	Rouvier I	Jules Grévy	
84		François Logerot	12 December 1887	3 April 1888	113 days	Tirard I	Sadi Carnot	
85		Charles de Freycinet	3 April 1888	11 January 1893	4 years, 283 days	Floquet; Tirard II de Freycinet IV; Loubet; Ribot I	Sadi Carnot	
86		Julien Loizillon	11 January 1893	3 December 1893	326 days	Ribot II; Dupuy I	Sadi Carnot	
87		Auguste Mercier	3 December 1893	28 January 1895	1 year, 56 days	Casimir-Perier; Dupuy II – III	Sadi Carnot	
87		Auguste Mercier	3 December 1893	28 January 1895	1 year, 56 days	Casimir-Perier; Dupuy II – III	Jean Casimir-Perier	
88		Émile Zurlinden	28 January 1895	1 November 1895	277 days	Ribot III	Jean Casimir-Perier	
89		Jacques Cavaignac	1 November 1895	29 April 1896	180 days	Bourgeois	Félix Faure	
90		Jean-Baptiste Billot	29 April 1896	28 June 1898	2 years, 60 days	Méline	Félix Faure	
91		Jacques Cavaignac	28 June 1898	5 September 1898	69 days	Brisson II	Félix Faure	
92		Émile Zurlinden	5 September 1898	17 September 1898	12 days	Brisson II	Félix Faure	
93		Charles Chanoine	17 September 1898	25 October 1898	38 days	Brisson II	Félix Faure	
Interim by Édouard Lockroy, Minister of Navy, from 25 October to 1 November 1898.								
94		Charles de Freycinet	1 November 1898	6 May 1899	186 days	Dupuy IV – V	Félix Faure	
94		Charles de Freycinet	1 November 1898	6 May 1899	186 days	Dupuy IV – V	Émile Loubet	
95		Camille Krantz	6 May 1899	22 June 1899	47 days	Dupuy V	Émile Loubet	
96		Gaston de Galliffet	22 June 1899	29 May 1900	341 days	Waldeck-Rousseau	Émile Loubet	
97		Louis André	29 May 1900	15 November 1904	4 years, 170 days	Waldeck-Rousseau; Combes	Émile Loubet	
98		Henri Berteaux	15 November 1904	12 November 1905	362 days	Combes; Rouvier II	Émile Loubet	
99		Eugène Étienne	12 November 1905	25 October 1906	347 days	Rouvier II – III; Sarrien	Émile Loubet	
99		Eugène Étienne	12 November 1905	25 October 1906	347 days	Rouvier II – III; Sarrien	Armand Fallières	
100		Georges Picquart	25 October 1906	24 July 1909	2 years, 272 days	Clemenceau I	Armand Fallières	
101		Jean Brun	24 July 1909	23 February 1911†	1 year, 214 days	Briand I – II	Armand Fallières	
Interim by Aristide Briand, President of the Council of Ministers, from 23 February to 2 March 1911.								
102		Henri Berteaux	2 March 1911	21 May 1911†	80 days	Monis	Armand Fallières	
Interim by Jean Cruppi, Minister of Foreign Affairs, from 21 May to 27 May 1911.								
103		François Goiran	27 May 1911	27 June 1911	15 days	Monis	Armand Fallières	
104		Adolphe Messimy	27 June 1911	14 January 1912	201 days	Caillaux	Armand Fallières	
105		Alexandre Millerand	14 January 1912	12 January 1913	364 days	Poincaré I	Armand Fallières	
106		Albert Lebrun	12 January 1913	21 January 1913	9 days	Poincaré I	Armand Fallières	
107		Eugène Étienne	21 January 1913	9 December 1913	322 days	Briand III – IV; Barthou	Armand Fallières	
107		Eugène Étienne	21 January 1913	9 December 1913	322 days	Briand III – IV; Barthou	Raymond Poincaré	
108		Joseph Noulens	9 December 1913	9 June 1914	182 days	Doumergue I	Raymond Poincaré	
109		Théophile Delcassé	9 June 1914	13 June 1914	4 days	Ribot IV	Raymond Poincaré	
110		Adolphe Messimy	13 June 1914	26 August 1914	74 days	Viviani I	Raymond Poincaré	
111		Alexandre Millerand	26 August 1914	29 October 1915	1 year, 64 days	Viviani II	Raymond Poincaré	
112		Joseph Gallieni	29 October 1915	16 March 1916	139 days	Briand V	Raymond Poincaré	
113		Pierre Roques	16 March 1916	12 December 1916	271 days	Briand V	Raymond Poincaré	
114		Hubert Lyautey	12 December 1916	15 March 1917	93 days	Briand VI	Raymond Poincaré	
Interim by Lucien Lacaze, Minister of Navy, from 15 March to 20 March 1917.								
115		Paul Painlevé	20 March 1917	16 November 1917	241 days	Ribot V Painlevé I	Raymond Poincaré	
116		Georges Clemenceau	16 November 1917	20 January 1920	2 years, 65 days	Clemenceau II	Raymond Poincaré	
117		André Lefèvre	20 January 1920	16 December 1920	331 days	Millerand I – II; Leygues	Raymond Poincaré	
117		André Lefèvre	20 January 1920	16 December 1920	331 days	Millerand I – II; Leygues	Paul Deschanel	
117		André Lefèvre	20 January 1920	16 December 1920	331 days	Millerand I – II; Leygues	Alexandre Millerand	
118		Flaminius Raiberti	16 December 1920	16 January 1921	31 days	Leygues	Alexandre Millerand	
119		Louis Barthou	16 January 1921	15 January 1922	364 days	Briand VII	Alexandre Millerand	
120		André Maginot	15 January 1922	14 June 1924	2 years, 151 days	Poincaré II – III; François-Marsal	Alexandre Millerand	
121		Charles Nollet	14 June 1924	17 April 1925	307 days	Herriot I	Gaston Doumergue	
122		Paul Painlevé	17 April 1925	29 October 1925	195 days	Painlevé II	Gaston Doumergue	
123		Édouard Daladier	29 October 1925	28 November 1925	31 days	Painlevé III	Gaston Doumergue	
124		Paul Painlevé	28 November 1925	23 June 1926	207 days	Briand VIII – IX	Gaston Doumergue	
125		Adolphe Guillaumat	23 June 1926	19 July 1926	207 days	Briand X	Gaston Doumergue	
126		Paul Painlevé	19 July 1926	3 November 1929	3 years, 107 days	Herriot II; Poincaré IV–V; Briand XI	Gaston Doumergue	
127		André Maginot	3 November 1929	21 February 1930	110 days	Tardieu I	Gaston Doumergue	
128		René Besnard	21 February 1930	2 March 1930	9 days	Chautemps I	Gaston Doumergue	
129		André Maginot	2 March 1930	13 December 1930	286 days	Tardieu II	Gaston Doumergue	
130		Louis Barthou	13 December 1930	27 January 1931	45 days	Steeg	Gaston Doumergue	
131		André Maginot	27 January 1931	7 January 1932†	345 days	Laval I – II	Gaston Doumergue	
131		André Maginot	27 January 1931	7 January 1932†	345 days	Laval I – II	Paul Doumer	
Interim by Charles Dumont, Minister of Navy, from 7 January to 14 January 1932.								-
132		André Tardieu	14 January 1932	20 February 1932	37 days	Laval III	Paul Doumer	
133		François Piétri (Note: As Minister of National Defence.)	20 February 1932	3 June 1932	104 days	Tardieu III	Paul Doumer	
134		Joseph Paul-Boncour	3 June 1932	18 December 1932	198 days	Herriot III	Albert Lebrun	
135		Édouard Daladier	18 December 1932	30 January 1934	1 year, 43 days	Paul-Boncour; Daladier I Sarraut I Chautemps II	Albert Lebrun	
136		Jean Fabry (Note: As Minister of War and National Defence.)	30 January 1934	4 February 1934	5 days	Daladier II	Albert Lebrun	
137		Joseph Paul-Boncour	4 February 1934	9 February 1934	5 days	Daladier II	Albert Lebrun	
138		Philippe Pétain	9 February 1934	8 November 1934	272 days	Doumergue II	Albert Lebrun	
139		Louis Maurin	8 November 1934	7 June 1935	211 days	Flandin I Bouisson	Albert Lebrun	
140		Jean Fabry	7 June 1935	24 January 1936	231 days	Laval IV	Albert Lebrun	
141		Louis Maurin	24 January 1936	4 June 1936	132 days	Sarraut II	Albert Lebrun	
142		Édouard Daladier	4 June 1936	18 May 1940	3 years, 349 days	Blum I Chautemps III – IV; Blum II; Daladier III – IV – V Reynaud	Albert Lebrun	
143		Paul Reynaud	18 May 1940	16 June 1940	29 days	Reynaud	Albert Lebrun	
144		Louis Colson	16 June 1940	10 July 1940	24 days	Pétain	Albert Lebrun	

=== Vichy France ===
No.	Portrait	Name	Term			Cabinet	Chief of State	Ref.
No.	Portrait	Name	Took office	Left office	Time in office	Cabinet	Chief of State	Ref.
-		Louis Colson (Note: As Secretary of State of War.)	10 July 1940	6 September 1940	58 days	Laval V	Philippe Pétain	
-		Charles Huntziger	6 September 1940	12 November 1941†	1 year, 66 days	Laval V Flandin II; Darlan	Philippe Pétain	
-		François Darlan (Note: Ad interim initially, as Secretary of State of the Navy.)	12 November 1941	18 April 1942	158 days	Darlan	Philippe Pétain	
-		Eugène Bridoux	18 April 1942	20 August 1944	2 years, 124 days	Laval VI	Philippe Pétain	

=== Free France ===
No.	Portrait	Name	Term			Cabinet	Leader	Ref.
No.	Portrait	Name	Took office	Left office	Time in office	Cabinet	Leader	Ref.
145		Paul Legentilhomme (Note: As Commissioner of War.)	24 September 1941	9 November 1943	2 years, 46 days	CNF	Charles de Gaulle	
145		Paul Legentilhomme	24 September 1941	9 November 1943	2 years, 46 days	CFLN	Charles de Gaulle	
146		André Le Troquer	9 November 1943	4 April 1944	147 days	CFLN	Charles de Gaulle	
147		André Diethelm	4 April 1944	10 September 1944	159 days	CFLN	Charles de Gaulle	

=== Provisional Government ===
No.	Portrait	Name	Term			Cabinet	President	Ref.
No.	Portrait	Name	Took office	Left office	Time in office	Cabinet	President	Ref.
(147)		André Diethelm	10 September 1944	21 November 1945	1 year, 72 days	de Gaulle I	Charles de Gaulle	

=== Fourth Republic ===
No.	Portrait	Name	Term			Government	President	Ref.
No.	Portrait	Name	Took office	Left office	Time in office	Government	President	Ref.
148		Paul Coste-Floret serving with Defence Minister François Billoux	22 January 1947	22 October 1947	273 days	Ramadier I	Vincent Auriol	
Ministry disestablished
