= First cabinet of Nicolas Jean-de-Dieu Soult =

French cabinet from 1832–1834

- Cabinet of France

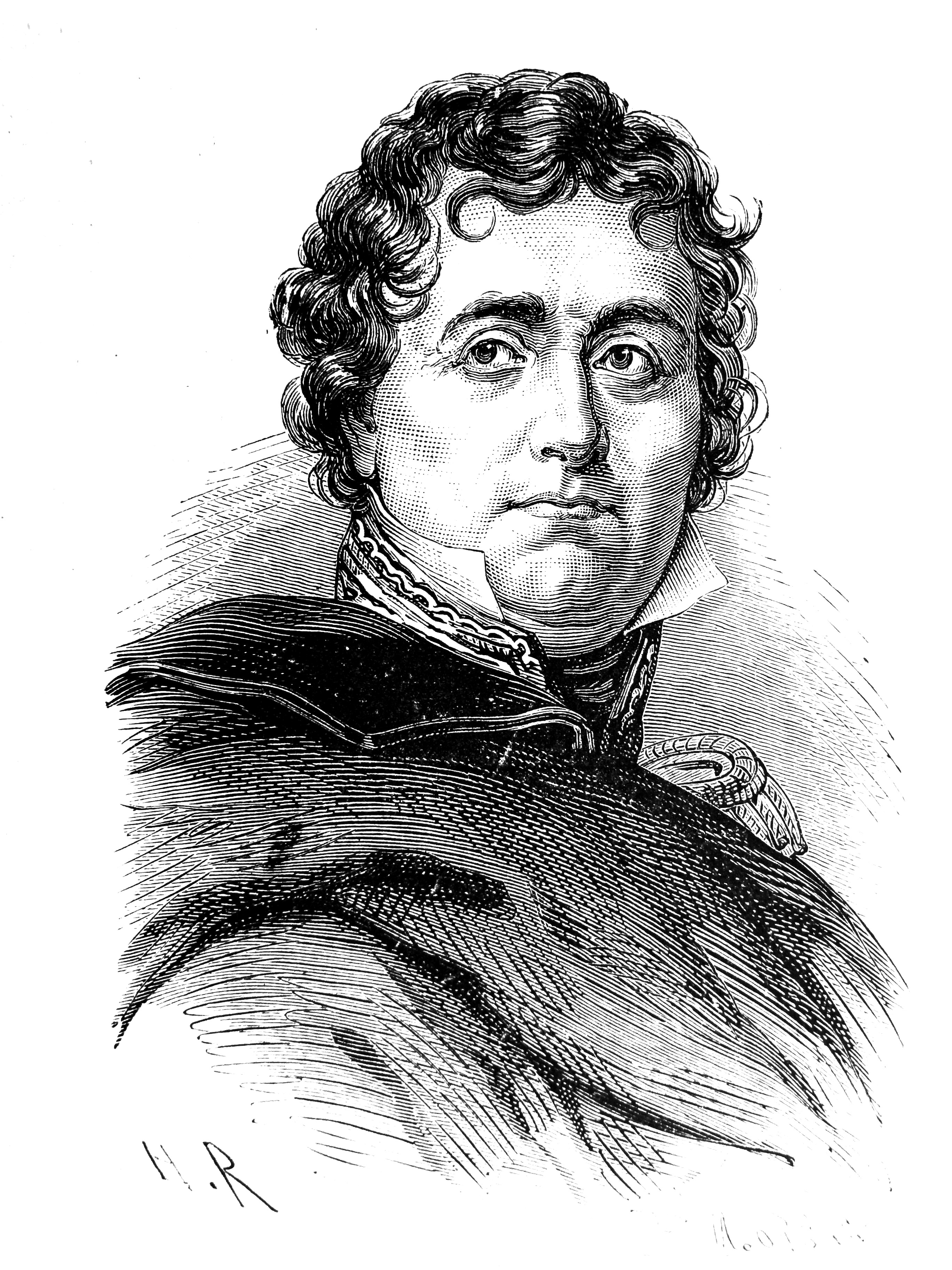
- Nicolas Jean-de-Dieu Soult
- Date formed: 11 October 1832
- Date dissolved: 18 July 1834

People and organisations
- Head of state: Louis Philippe I
- Head of government: Nicolas Jean-de-Dieu Soult

History
- Predecessor: Cabinet of Casimir Périer
- Successor: Cabinet of Étienne Maurice, Comte Gérard

The First cabinet of Nicolas Jean-de-Dieu Soult was announced on 16 May 1832 by King Louis Philippe I. It replaced the Cabinet of Casimir Périer. It was dissolved on 18 July 1834 and replaced by the Cabinet of Étienne Maurice, comte Gérard.

== Ministers ==
The cabinet was created by ordinances of 11 October 1832, with Marshall Soult as president. The ministers were:

| Portfolio | Holder | Party |
|---|---|---|
| President of the Council of Ministers | Jean-de-Dieu Soult | None |
Ministers
| Minister of War | Marshal Jean-de-Dieu Soult | None |
| Minister of the Interior | Adolphe Thiers | Centre-right |
| Minister of Justice | Félix Barthe | Centre-left |
| Minister of Foreign Affairs | The Duke of Broglie | Centre-right |
| Minister of Finance | Georges Humann | Centre-right |
| Minister of the Navy and Colonies | Admiral Count of Rigny | Centre-right |
| Minister of Public Education and Worship | François Guizot | Centre-right |
| Minister of Commerce and Public Works | The Count of Argout | Centre-right |

== Changes ==
On 31 December 1832:

| Portfolio | Holder | Party |
|---|---|---|
| Minister of the Interior | The Count of Argout | Centre-right |
| Minister of Commerce and Public Works | Adolphe Thiers | Centre-right |

On 4 April 1834:

| Portfolio | Holder | Party |
|---|---|---|
| Minister of the Interior | Adolphe Thiers | Centre-right |
| Minister of Justice | Jean-Charles Persil | Centre-right |
| Minister of Foreign Affairs | Admiral Count of Rigny | Centre-right |
| Minister of the Navy and Colonies | Admiral Albin Roussin | None |
| Minister of Commerce and Public Works | Tanneguy Duchâtel | Centre-right |

On 19 May 1834:

| Portfolio | Holder | Party |
|---|---|---|
| Minister of the Navy and Colonies | Admiral Louis Jacob | None |

== Sources ==
- Muel, Léon (1891). Gouvernements, ministères et constitutions de la France depuis cent ans: Précis historique des révolutions, des crises ministérielles et gouvernementales, et des changements de constitutions de la France depuis 1789 jusqu'en 1890 ... Marchal et Billard.
