= Cabinet of Casimir Périer =

French cabinet from 1831–1832

- Cabinet of France

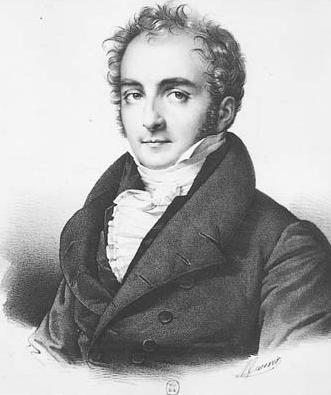
- Casimir Pierre Périer
- Date formed: 13 March 1831
- Date dissolved: 16 May 1832

People and organisations
- Head of state: Louis Philippe I
- Head of government: Casimir Pierre Périer

History
- Predecessor: Cabinet of Jacques Laffitte
- Successor: First cabinet of Nicolas Jean-de-Dieu Soult

The Cabinet of Casimir Périer was announced on 13 March 1831 by King Louis Philippe I. It replaced the Cabinet of Jacques Laffitte. Perier died of cholera on 16 May 1832. Louis-Philippe acted as president of the council until 11 October 1832, when the cabinet was replaced by the first cabinet of Nicolas Jean-de-Dieu Soult.

== Ministers ==
The ministers in Périer's cabinet and under Louis-Philippe after Périer died were:

Portfolio	Holder	Party
President of the Council of Ministers	Casimir Perier	Centre-right
Ministers
Minister of the Interior	Casimir Perier	Centre-right
Minister of Justice	Félix Barthe	Centre-left
Minister of Foreign Affairs	Marshal Horace Sébastiani	None
Minister of War	Marshal Jean-de-Dieu Soult	None
Minister of Finance	The Baron Louis	Centre-right
Minister of the Navy and Colonies	Admiral Count of Rigny	Centre-right
Minister of Public Education and Worship	The Count of Montalivet	Centre-right
Minister of Commerce and Public Works	The Count of Argout	Centre-right

== Changes ==
On 27 April 1832:

Portfolio	Holder	Party
Minister of the Interior	The Count of Montalivet	Centre-right
Minister of Public Education and Worship	The Baron Girod de l'Ain	Centre-right

== Sources ==
- Muel, Léon (1891). Gouvernements, ministères et constitutions de la France depuis cent ans: Précis historique des révolutions, des crises ministérielles et gouvernementales, et des changements de constitutions de la France depuis 1789 jusqu'en 1890 ... Marchal et Billard.
