= Cabinet of Édouard Adolphe Mortier =

French cabinet from 1834 to 1835

- Cabinet of France

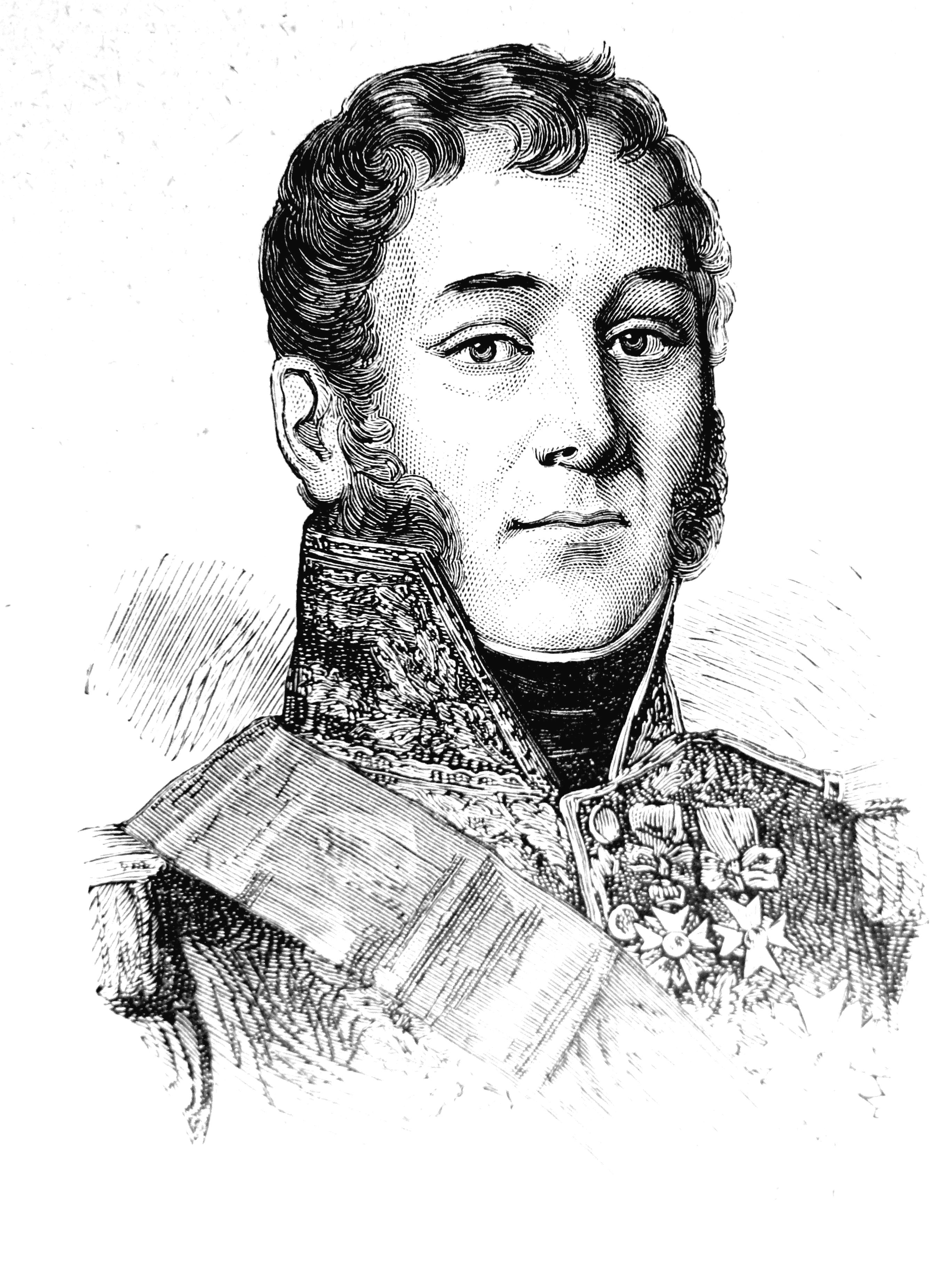
- Édouard Mortier, duc de Trévise
- Date formed: 18 November 1834
- Date dissolved: 12 March 1835

People and organisations
- Head of state: Louis Philippe I
- Head of government: Édouard Mortier, duc de Trévise

History
- Predecessor: Cabinet of Hugues-Bernard Maret
- Successor: Cabinet of Victor de Broglie

The Cabinet of Édouard Adolphe Mortier was announced on 18 November 1834 by King Louis Philippe I. It replaced the Cabinet of Hugues-Bernard Maret.

The ministry was headed by Marshal Édouard Mortier, duc de Trévise, who accepted the position out of loyalty to the king. He was not an experienced parliamentarian and was unable to command respect. On 20 February 1835 he submitted his resignation. The cabinet was replaced on 12 March 1835 by the Cabinet of Victor de Broglie.

== Ministers ==
The cabinet was created by ordinance of 18 November 1834. The ministers were:

Portfolio	Holder	Party
President of the Council of Ministers	General Édouard Mortier	Centre-right
Ministers
Minister of War	General Édouard Mortier	Centre-right
Minister of the Interior	Adolphe Thiers	Centre-right
Minister of Justice and Worship	Jean-Charles Persil	Centre-right
Minister of Foreign Affairs	Admiral Count of Rigny	Centre-right
Minister of Finance	Georges Humann	Centre-right
Minister of the Navy and Colonies	Admiral Guy-Victor Duperré	None
Minister of Public Education	François Guizot	Centre-right
Minister of Commerce	Tanneguy Duchâtel	Centre-right

== Sources ==
- Muel, Léon (1891). Gouvernements, ministères et constitutions de la France depuis cent ans: Précis historique des révolutions, des crises ministérielles et gouvernementales, et des changements de constitutions de la France depuis 1789 jusqu'en 1890 ... Marchal et Billard.
