= Cabinet of Étienne Maurice, comte Gérard =

French cabinet of 1834

- Cabinet of France

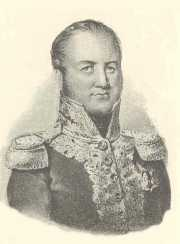
- Étienne Maurice Gérard
- Date formed: 18 July 1834
- Date dissolved: 10 November 1834

People and organisations
- Head of state: Louis Philippe I
- Head of government: Étienne Maurice Gérard

History
- Predecessor: First cabinet of Nicolas Jean-de-Dieu Soult
- Successor: Cabinet of Hugues-Bernard Maret

The Cabinet of Étienne Maurice, comte Gérard was announced on 18 July 1834 by King Louis Philippe I. It replaced the First cabinet of Nicolas Jean-de-Dieu Soult. It was dissolved on 10 November 1834 and replaced by the Cabinet of Hugues-Bernard Maret.

== Ministers ==
The cabinet was created by ordinance of 18 July 1834, with Marshal Étienne Maurice Gérard as President. Apart from replacing Marshal Soult by Marshal Étienne Maurice Gérard as President and Minister of War, the ministers remained the same. The ministers were:

Portfolio	Holder	Party
President of the Council of Ministers	Count Gérard	None
Ministers
Minister of War	Marshal Count Gérard	None
Minister of the Interior	Adolphe Thiers	Centre-right
Minister of Justice and Worship	Jean-Charles Persil	Centre-right
Minister of Foreign Affairs	Admiral Count of Rigny	Centre-right
Minister of Finance	Georges Humann	Centre-right
Minister of the Navy and Colonies	Admiral Louis Jacob	None
Minister of Public Education	François Guizot	Centre-right
Minister of Commerce	Tanneguy Duchâtel	Centre-right

== Sources ==
- Muel, Léon (1891). Gouvernements, ministères et constitutions de la France depuis cent ans: Précis historique des révolutions, des crises ministérielles et gouvernementales, et des changements de constitutions de la France depuis 1789 jusqu'en 1890 ... Marchal et Billard.
