= Decaux =

Decaux, or De Caux, is a French surname. Notable people with the surname include:

Decaux

- Abel Decaux (1869–1943), French classical organist and composer
- Alain Decaux (1925–2016), French historian
- Alice Decaux (born 1985), French hurdler
- Georges Decaux (1930–2015), French cyclist
- Jacques Decaux (1918–2003), French sport shooter
- Jean-Claude Decaux (1937–2016), French businessman

De Caux

- Jean Baptiste de Caux of Blacquetot (1723-1796), French army officer
- John de Caux, or John de Caleto (c. 1205 – 1263), Norman-English administrator
- Len De Caux (1899–1991), American labor activist
- Louis Victor de Blacquetot de Caux (1773–1845), French army officer

== See also ==
- Iphigénie Decaux-Milet-Moreau (1778–1862), French painter
