= Cabinet of Jacques Laffitte =

French cabinet from 1830–1831

- Cabinet of France

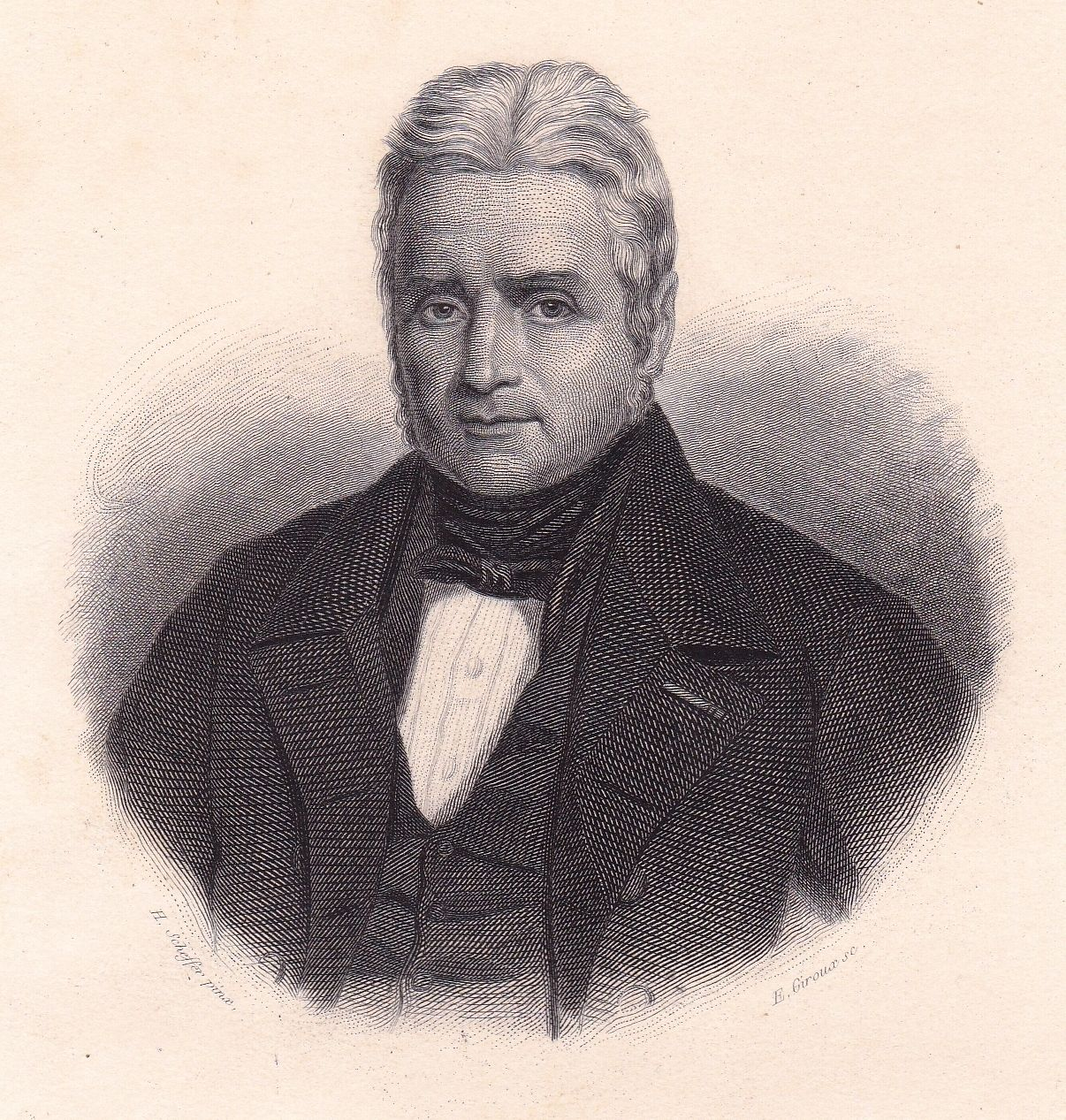
- Jacques Laffitte
- Date formed: 2 November 1830
- Date dissolved: 13 March 1831

People and organisations
- Head of state: Louis Philippe I
- Head of government: Jacques Laffitte

History
- Predecessor: First ministry of Louis-Philippe
- Successor: Cabinet of Casimir Périer

The Cabinet of Jacques Laffitte was announced on 2 November 1830 by King Louis Philippe I. It replaced the First ministry of Louis-Philippe. On 13 March 1831 it was replaced by the Cabinet of Casimir Périer.

== Ministers ==
The ministers were:

Portfolio	Holder	Party
President of the Council of Ministers	Jacques Laffitte	Centre-left
Ministers
Minister of Finance	Jacques Laffitte	Centre-left
Minister of the Interior	The Count of Montalivet	Centre-right
Minister of Justice	Jacques-Charles Dupont	Centre-left
Minister of Foreign Affairs	Marshal The Marquis Maison	None
Minister of War	Marshal The Count Gérard	None
Minister of the Navy and Colonies	Marshal Horace Sébastiani	None
Minister of Public Education and Worship	Joseph Mérilhou	Centre-left

== Changes ==
On 17 November 1830:

Portfolio	Holder	Party
Minister of Foreign Affairs	Marshal Horace Sébastiani	None
Minister of War	Marshal Jean-de-Dieu Soult	None
Minister of the Navy and Colonies	The Count of Argout	Centre-right

On 27 December 1830:

Portfolio	Holder	Party
Minister of Justice	Joseph Mérilhou	Centre-left
Minister of Public Education and Worship	Félix Barthe	Centre-left
