= Cabinet of Hugues-Bernard Maret =

French cabinet of 1834

- Cabinet of France

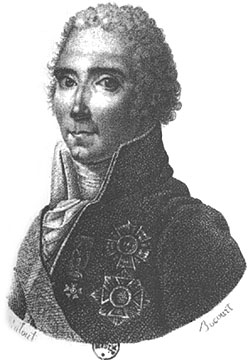
- Hugues-Bernard Maret, duc de Bassano
- Date formed: 10 November 1834
- Date dissolved: 18 November 1834

People and organisations
- Head of state: Louis Philippe I
- Head of government: Hugues-Bernard Maret, duc de Bassano

History
- Predecessor: Cabinet of Étienne Maurice Gérard
- Successor: Cabinet of Édouard Adolphe Mortier

The Cabinet of Hugues-Bernard Maret was announced on 10 November 1834 by King Louis Philippe I. It replaced the Cabinet of Étienne Maurice, comte Gérard.

The cabinet became known as the Three-Day Ministry since the President of the council, Hugues-Bernard Maret, duc de Bassano resigned on 14 November 1834 following an outburst of ridicule in the press, led by the Moniteur.

The cabinet was replaced on 18 November 1834 by the Cabinet of Édouard Adolphe Mortier.

== Ministers ==
The cabinet was created by ordinance of 10 November 1834. The ministers were:

Portfolio	Holder	Party
President of the Council of Ministers	Hugues-Bernard Maret	Centre
Ministers
Minister of the Interior	Hugues-Bernard Maret	Centre
Minister of Justice and Worship	Jean-Charles Persil	Centre-right
Minister of Foreign Affairs	Charles Joseph Bresson	None
Minister of Finance	Hippolyte Passy	Centre
Minister of War	Lt. General Simon Bernard	None
Minister of the Navy and Colonies	Charles Dupin	Centre
Minister of Public Education	Jean-Baptiste Teste	Centre
Minister of Commerce	Jean-Baptiste Teste	Centre

== Sources ==
- Muel, Léon (1891). Gouvernements, ministères et constitutions de la France depuis cent ans: Précis historique des révolutions, des crises ministérielles et gouvernementales, et des changements de constitutions de la France depuis 1789 jusqu'en 1890 ... Marchal et Billard.
