= Louis Antoine François de Marchangy =

French lawyer, author and politician

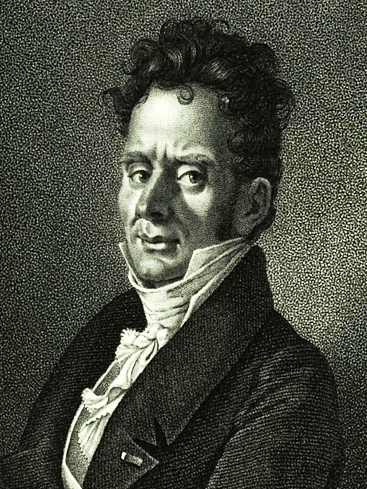
- Born: 25 August 1782; Saint-Saulge, Nièvre, France
- Died: 2 February 1826 (aged 43); Paris, France
- Occupations: Lawyer, author and politician
- Known for: la Gaule poétique

Louis Antoine François de Marchangy (25 August 1782 – 2 February 1826) was a French lawyer, author and politician. He was a passionate supporter first of Napoleon and later of the Bourbons, and an impressive force in the courtroom. He was a Deputy from 1822 to 1824.

== Lawyer ==
Louis Antoine François de Marchangy was born in Saint-Saulge, Nièvre, on 25 August 1782, son of a bailiff. He excelled in classical studies, and won a scholarship from the department of Nièvre to study at the school of law of Paris. After qualifying as a lawyer, he joined the magistracy. At the same time, he continued literary studies. In 1808 he was appointed assistant judge at the Court of the First Instance of Paris. In 1813 he published his first work, la Gaule poétique, a two-volume study of the history of France in terms of its poetry, speeches and beaux-arts. This book made his reputation. Six editions were published between 1813 and 1826.

Marchangy was an enthusiastic supporter of Napoleon, and was made Imperial Crown prosecutor at the court of the Seine in 1810. The first trial that won him public attention was that of Vigier, founder of the baths on the Seine, who was subjected to a capital charge. After Napoleon's fall Marchangy became an equally enthusiastic royalist, and was appointed Crown prosecutor for the Bourbon monarchy. He acquired a great reputation, although he did not improvise and even wrote down his speeches. He combined passion with close reasoning, and his services were highly valued by the government.

Marchangy was most distinguished in political trials. His conclusions in the trials of two writers, Joseph Fiévée in 1818 and Nicolas Bergasse in 1821, were not supported by everyone. Even his biographer, generally very favorable to Marchangy, noted that through his method of interpretation and clever phraseology he could make out that a writer said what he had never written or thought. The liberal party accused Marchangy of using the same techniques at the trial of Féret, editor on l'Homme gris and of Père Michel, in the trial of the four Sergeants of La Rochelle and others. His merciless indictment against the sergeants of La Rochelle earned him the office of Advocate General at the Court of Cassation. In this indictment he referred to Joseph Mérilhou, lawyer for one of the accused, when he said, "Here the real culprits are not those in the dock, but those on the benches of advocates."

== Politician ==
On 20 November 1822 Marchangy ran successfully for election as Deputy for Nièvre, supported by the ultra-royalists. The same day he was also elected deputy for the Nord department. His admission was challenged on the grounds that he did not qualify on the basis of property ownership. The Ministry of Justice did not dare to interfere in the hot debate that followed. Eventually his double election was annulled. On 17 April 1823 Marchangy was replaced in Nièvre, but the same day was elected for the Nord. He took his seat and voted with the extreme right. He was reelected on 25 February 1824 for the Altkirch constituency of Haut-Rhin, but his election was again annulled.

Marchangy's Tristan le voyageur, ou la France au quatorzième siècle appeared in six volumes in 1825–26. He died of a chill on 2 February 1826 after a memorial ceremony on January 21. He was aged forty four.

== Works ==
Marchangy's literary works were soon forgotten. They included:

- La Gaule poétique ou l'Histoire de France considérée dans ses rapports avec la poésie, l'éloquence et les beaux-arts (1813)
- Bonheur de la campagne, poème en quatre chants
- Siège de Dantzig en 1813 (1814)
- Mémoires historiques pour l'ordre souverain de Saint-Jean de Jérusalem (1816)
- Tristan le voyageur, ou la France au quatorzième siècle (1825–1826)
