= First ministry of Louis-Philippe =

French government ministry of 1830

- Cabinet of France
- Date formed: 11 August 1830
- Date dissolved: 2 November 1830

People and organisations
- Head of state: Louis Philippe I

History
- Predecessor: Provisional Ministry
- Successor: Cabinet of Jacques Laffitte

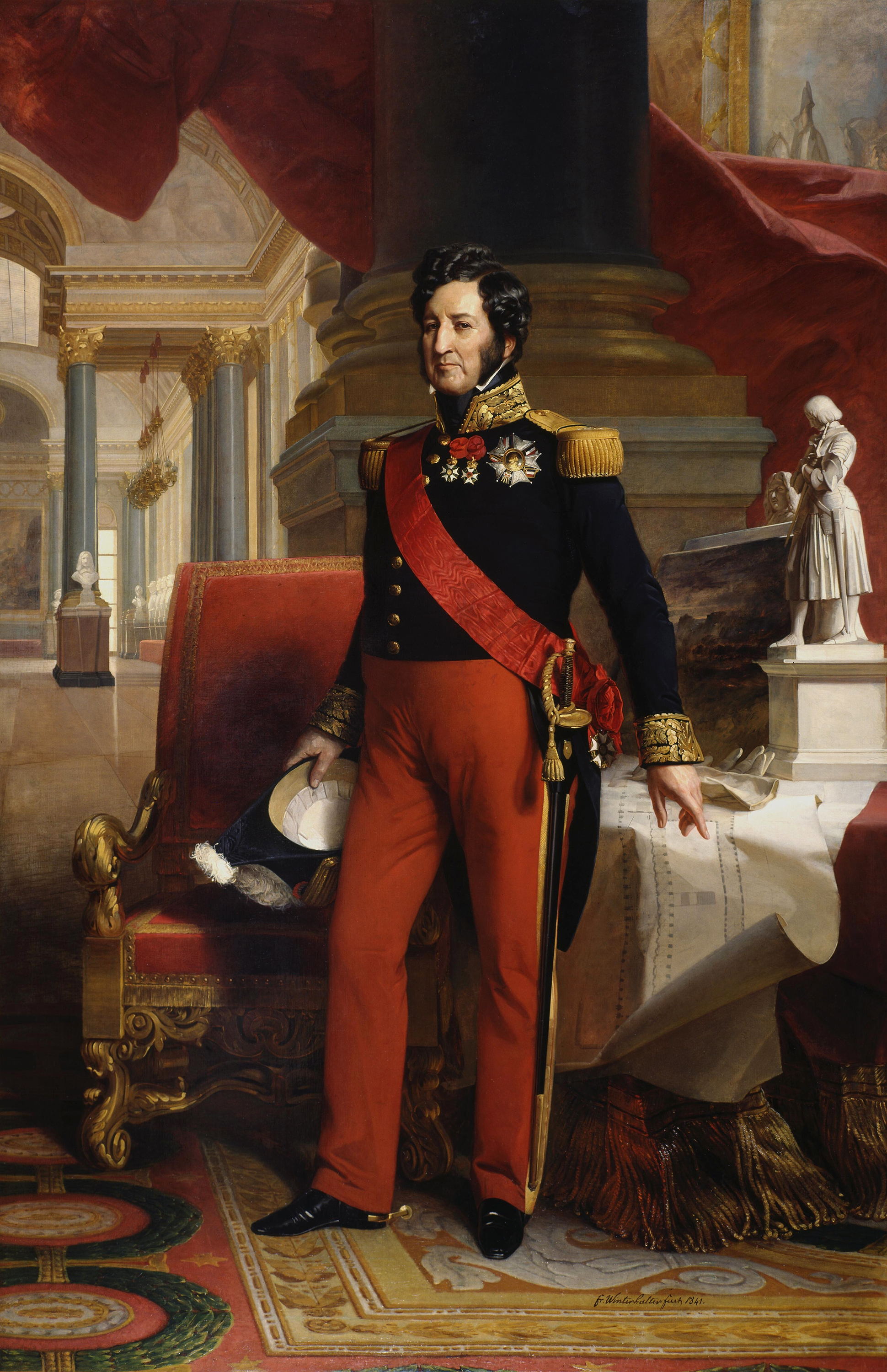

The First ministry of Louis-Philippe was announced on 11 August 1830 by King Louis Philippe I two days after he had become king. It replaced the Provisional Ministry announced on 1 August 1830. On 2 November 1830 it was replaced by the Cabinet of Jacques Laffitte.

== Ministers ==
Louis Philippe did not designate a president of the council. Jacques-Charles Dupont de l'Eure, keeper of the seals as Minister of Justice, countersigned the ordinances issued by his colleagues. Victor de Broglie was president of the council of state. The ministers were:

Portfolio	Holder	Party
President of the Council of Ministers	Louis Philippe I (Personal union with the Crown)	None
Ministers
Minister of the Interior	François Guizot	Orléanist
Minister of Justice	Jacques-Charles Dupont	Orléanist
Minister of Foreign Affairs	Louis-Mathieu Molé	Orléanist
Minister of War	Marshal Count Gérard	Orléanist
Minister of the Navy and Colonies	Marshal Horace Sébastiani	Orléanist
Minister of Finance	The Baron Louis	Orléanist
Minister of Public Education and Worship	The Duke of Broglie	Orléanist
Ministers without portfolio
—	Jacques Laffitte	Orléanist
—	Casimir Perier	Orléanist
—	André Dupin	Orléanist
—	The Baron Bignon	Orléanist

== Sources ==
- Freitag, Sabine; Mösslang, Markus; Wende, Peter (2002). British Envoys to Germany, 1816-1866: 1830-1847. Cambridge University Press. ISBN 978-0-521-81868-1.
- Hamilton, Richard F. (1991). The Bourgeois Epoch: Marx and Engels on Britain, France, and Germany. UNC Press Books. ISBN 978-0-8078-4325-3.
- Irwin, John T. (18 September 1996). The Mystery to a Solution: Poe, Borges, and the Analytic Detective Story. JHU Press. ISBN 978-0-8018-5466-8.
- Muel, Léon (1891). Gouvernements, ministères et constitutions de la France depuis cent ans: Précis historique des révolutions, des crises ministérielles et gouvernementales, et des changements de constitutions de la France depuis 1789 jusqu'en 1890 ... Marchal et Billard.
- Talleyrand, Charles Maurice de (1891). Memoirs of the Prince de Talleyrand. Griffith Farran Okeden and Welsh. p. 228.
