= Auguste Regnaud de Saint-Jean d'Angély =

Marshal of France and politician

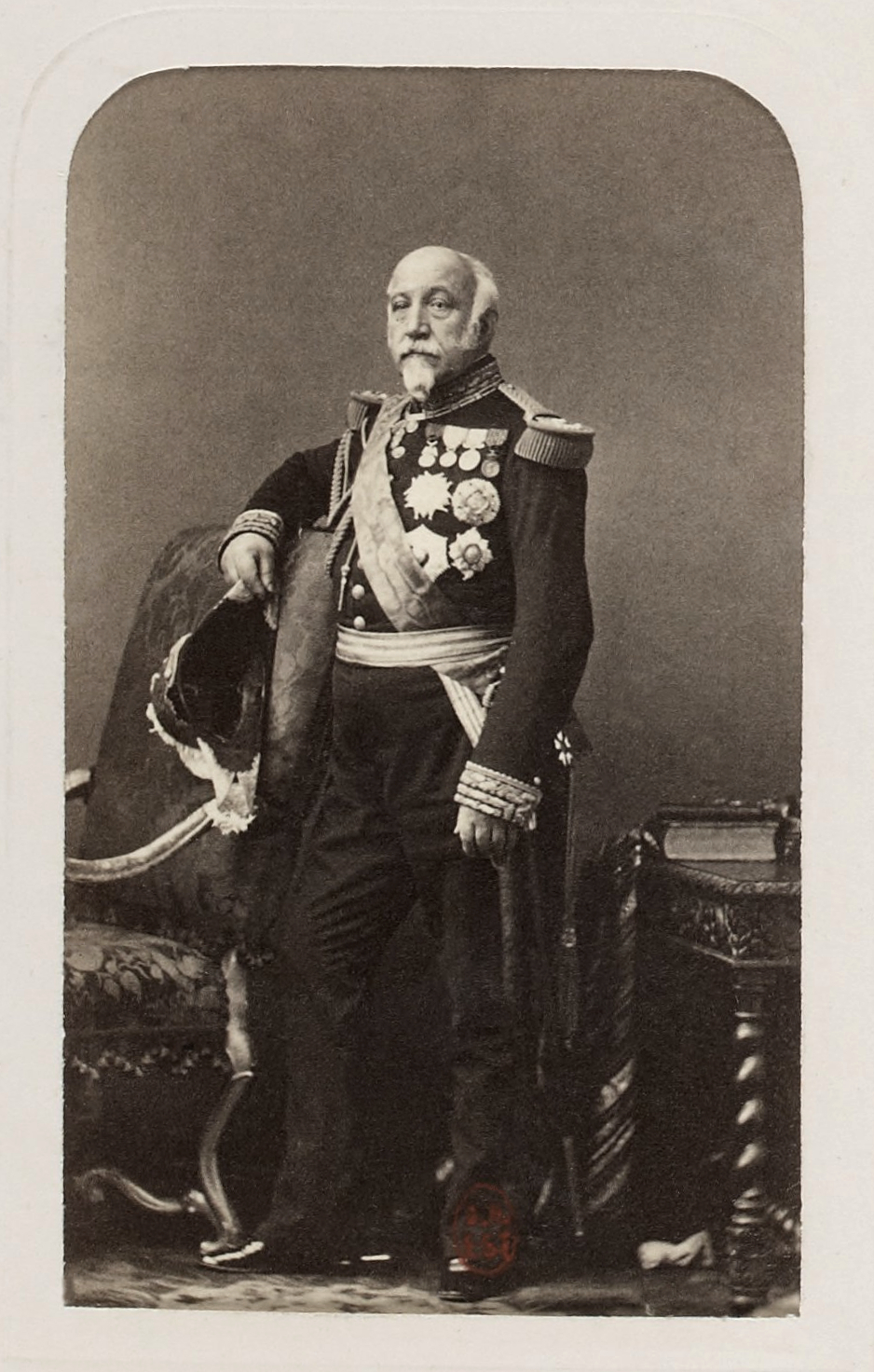
- Portrait, c. 1860
- Born: 30 July 1794; Paris, France
- Died: 1 February 1870 (aged 75); Cannes, France
- Burial place: Les Invalides
- Military career
- Allegiance: First French Empire; Bourbon Restoration; July Monarchy; French Second Republic; Second French Empire
- Branch: French Army
- Service years: c. 1813–1870
- Rank: Maréchal de France
- Wars: Napoleonic Wars; War of the Sixth Coalition; Hundred Days; Greek War of Independence; Morea expedition; Crimean War; Second Italian War of Independence

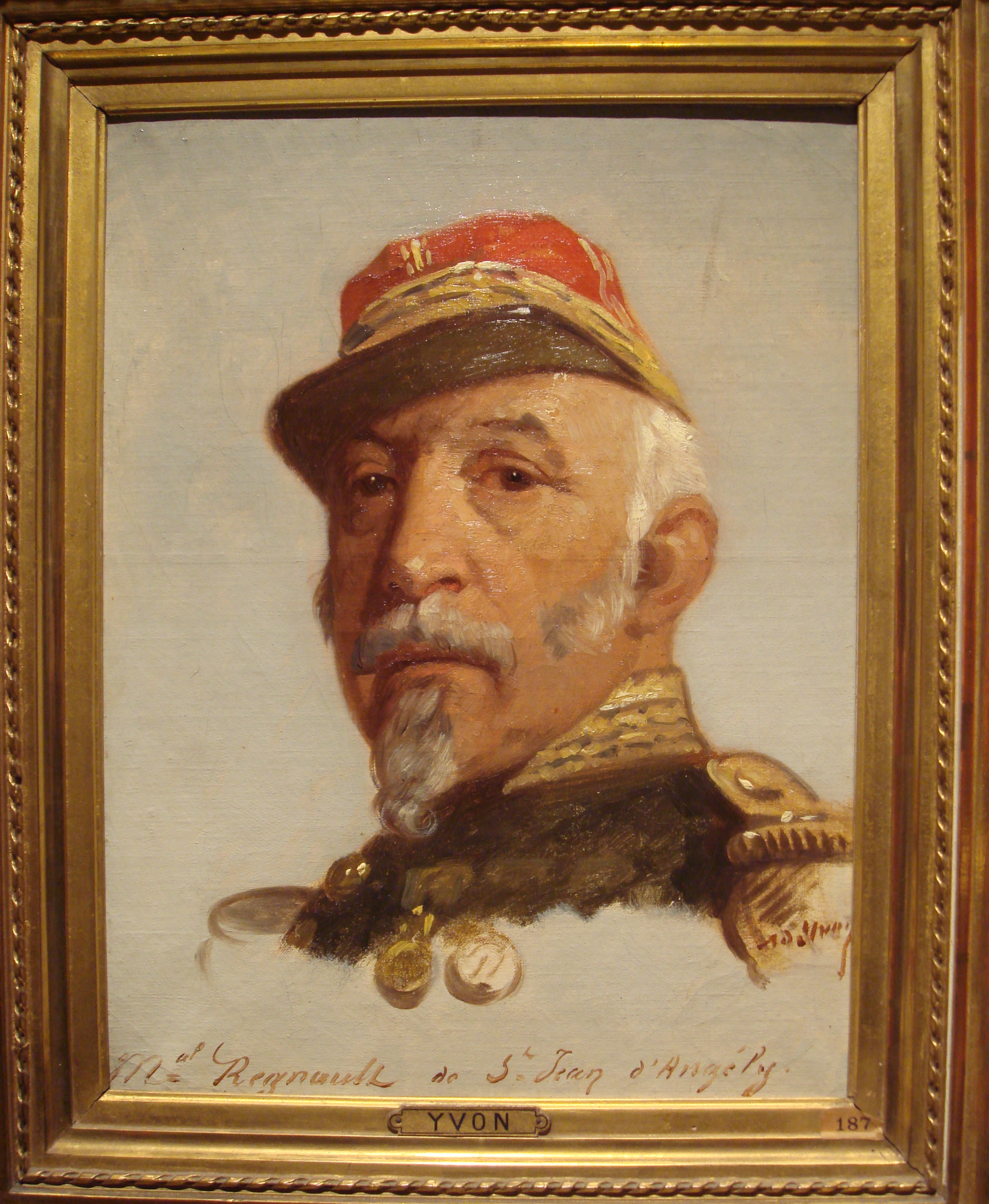
Auguste Regnaud de Saint-Jean d'Angély (1794-1870), by Auguste Yvon (1817-1893).

Auguste Michel Étienne Regnaud de Saint-Jean d'Angély, later 2nd Count Regnaud de Saint-Jean d'Angély (30 July 1794 – 1 February 1870), was a Marshal of France, soldier and politician.

== Biography ==
Auguste was the illegitimate son of Michel-Louis-Étienne, Count Regnaud de Saint-Jean d'Angély, and of his mistress Marie-Louise Chenié, who died shortly after his birth, he was recognised by his father some months later and adopted by the latter's wife in 1795.

Regnaud served as a lieutenant in a regiment of hussars during the campaign of Saxe in 1813. He fought at the Battle of Leipzig, after which he became a member of Emperor Napoleon's personal military staff.

As he had served as a personal officier d'ordonnance to the Emperor at Waterloo, he was dismissed from the army by the Restoration government with the rank of lieutenant. In 1825, he went to Greece, fought in the war of independence and was in charge of the instruction of a cavalry corps in the new Greek army. In 1828, he took part in the Morea expedition of the French army as an interpreter. He was promoted to the rank of captain in 1829.

During the July Monarchy, Regnaud de Saint-Jean d'Angély served as a colonel in the expedition to Belgium. He was promoted to général de brigade in 1841 and to général de division in 1849. In 1848, he was elected deputy and sat on the right. In 1851, he served for a fortnight as minister of war. In 1852, he backed Louis-Napoléon Bonaparte and, as a reward, he was made a senator for life. Under the Second Empire, he went through the Crimean and Italian campaigns, and ultimately was created Marshal of France in 1859 for bravery at the Battle of Magenta.

== Family ==
Marshal Regnaud de Saint-Jean d'Angély married Anne-Angélique Ruby, who bore him no children. He adopted her daughter from a previous marriage, Flore-Angélique Regnaud de Saint-Jean d'Angély.

Since his father never married his mother (who died some months after the redaction of a marriage contract), Regnaud de Saint-Jean d'Angély had not been able to succeed to his title of count. Notwithstanding, Napoléon III granted him the title again in November 1864, with the special permission to pass it at his death to the husband of his adoptive daughter, Edmond Davillier. The latter took the surname "Davillier-Regnaud de Saint-Jean-d'Angély" and was confirmed in the succession of the title of count at the death of his father-in-law. However, it became extinct at his own death in 1908 since he had only a daughter from his marriage with the Marshal's stepdaughter.

Marshal Regnaud de Saint-Jean d'Angély died in Cannes in 1870 and was buried in the Hôtel des Invalides in Paris.

== Notes ==
Political offices
Preceded by Jean-Paul, comte de Schramm	Minister of War; 9 January 1851 – 24 January 1851	Succeeded by Jacques Louis Randon
