= Iphigénie Decaux-Milet-Moreau =

19th-century French painter

- Born: 17 June 1778; Toulon, France
- Died: 8 July 1862 (aged 84); Paris, France

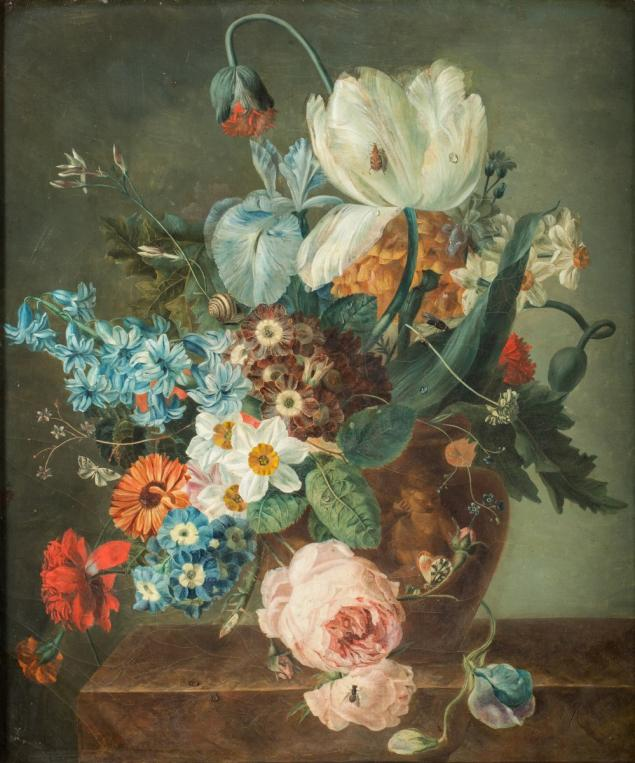
Flowers in a vase

Iphigénie Decaux or Vicomtesse Iphigenie Decaux, née Milet-Moreau (17 June 1778 – 8 July 1862) was a French flower painter.

Decaux was born in Toulon as the daughter of Louis Marie de Milet de Mureau. She took lessons from the flower painter Jan Frans van Dael and became an accomplished painter in her own right, though because of her wealthy connections she painted more as a hobby than for a living. In 1800 she married Louis Victor de Blacquetot de Caux and thereafter went by the name Vicomtesse Iphigenie Decaux.

Decaux died in Paris.
