= Félix Barthe =

French lawyer and government minister (1795–1863)

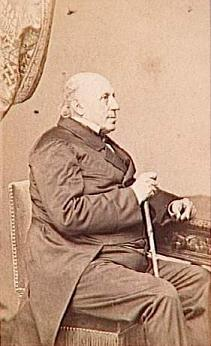
- Born: 28 July 1795; Narbonne, Aude, France
- Died: 28 February 1863 (aged 67); Paris, France
- Occupations: Lawyer and politician
- Known for: President of the Court of Accounts

Félix Barthe (28 July 1795 – 28 February 1863) was a French lawyer, Deputy, Minister of Public Education and then Minister of Justice. He was the first President of the Court of Accounts (1834–37, 1839–63) and became a Senator of the Second French Empire.

== Early years ==
Félix Barthe was born in Narbonne, Aude, on 28 July 1795. His parents were Michel Barthe (1758–1820), deputy and counsel of the five hundred, and Marie-Anne Valette (1762–1830). He was educated at Saint-Rémy college in Toulouse, then studied at the faculty of Law, and began his career in Paris. He became affiliated with the Carbonari. On 8 August 1820 he married Célestine Victoire Thomas (1801–1875). They had one daughter.

Barthe soon became known by the Liberal party when he spoke at the funeral of a young man named Lallemand, who was killed by a Royal Guardsman in June 1820 while shouting "Long Live the Charter" during a riot in the Place de la Concorde. Barthe attacked the murderer before the council of war, who refused to listen, and sent a protest to the newspapers. The censors would not allow its publication.

Barthe mostly pleaded in political trials. He obtained the acquittal of Lieutenant Colonel Augustin Joseph Caron in the Chamber of Peers. In Colmar he defended three of the accused in the Conspiracy of Béfort, then in Paris defended the Four Sergeants of La Rochelle. He defended the Deputy for the Bas-Rhin, Jacques Koechlin, for his pamphlet on the Colmar plot. In this case in July 1823 Barthe was suspended for a month for the liveliness of his defense. He pleaded before the Chamber of Deputies for the Journal du Commerce, guilty of having discussed the elections too freely, which received a minimum sentence.

== July Monarchy ==
Barthe took an active part in the July Revolution of 1830, in the protest of the journalists and the work of the Municipal Committee, and was then appointed prosecutor at the Civil Court of the Seine. On 21 October 1830 he was elected Deputy for the 7th arrondissement of Paris. Barthe entered the cabinet of Jacques Laffitte on 27 December 1830, replacing Joseph Mérilhou at the Ministry of Public Education. In this post he ran successfully for reelection as Deputy in the 11th arrondissement of Paris on 10 February 1831. On 12 March 1831 he became Minister of Justice in the new cabinet of Casimir Perier. On 5 July 1831 he was reelected Deputy in the 11th arrondissement. Barthe made some changes to the penal law, of which a new version was promulgated on 28 April 1832. He remained Minister of Justice until 4 April 1834.

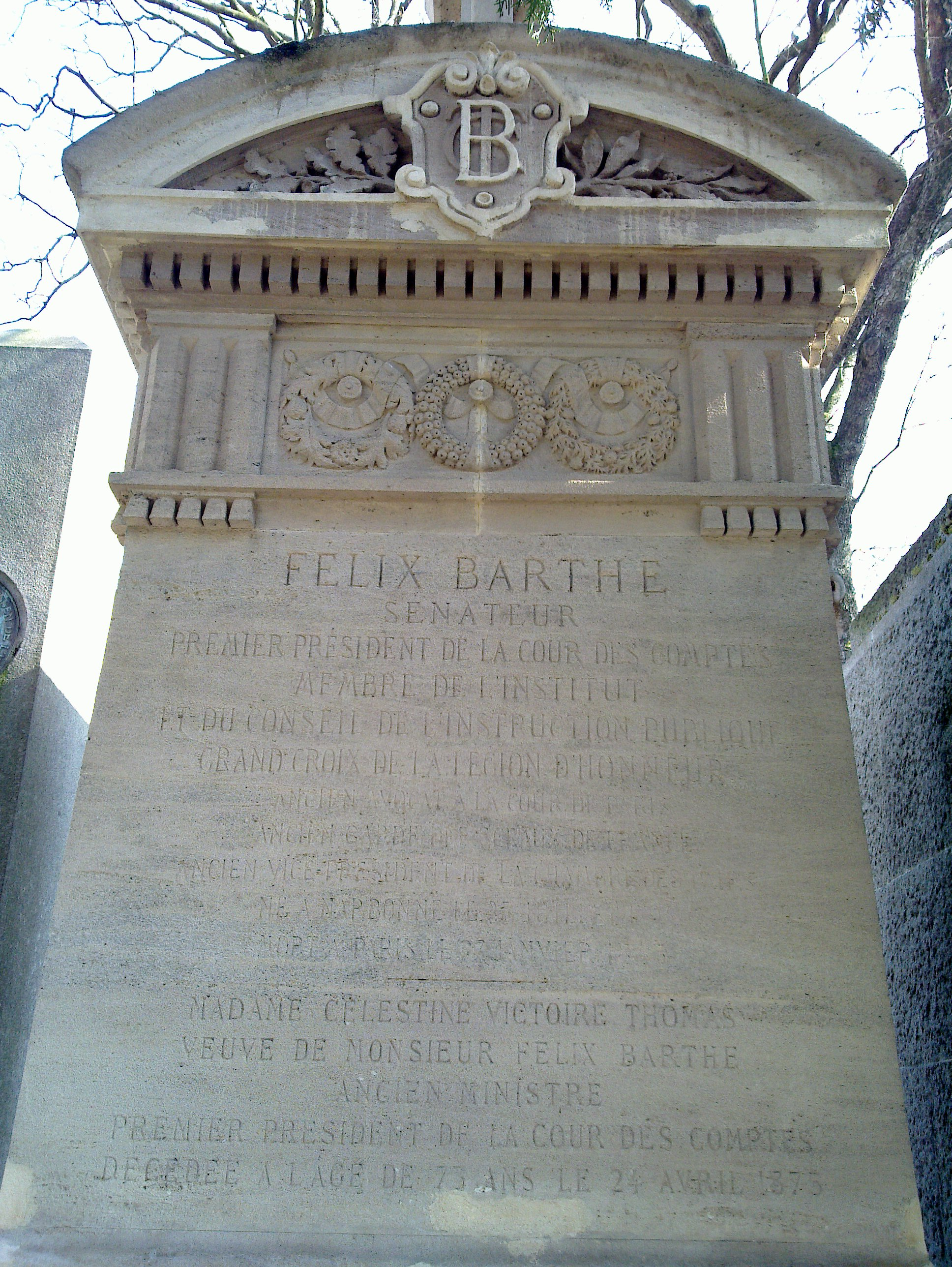
Barthe's grave in the Père-Lachaise cemetery in Paris

Barthe was named a peer of France and President of Court of Accounts. On 15 April 1837 he joined the cabinet of Louis Mathieu Molé, holding office until 31 March 1839. He then returned to the Presidency of the Court of Accounts. He was given the Grand Cross of the Legion of Honor on 19 April 1846.

== Second Empire ==
In 1848 Barthe was dismissed as first president of the Legion of Honor, but was restored in 1849. On 31 December 1852 he was appointed a Senator of the Second Empire. His former views were greatly moderated. He sometimes spoke in the house, in particular in an address on 6 March 1861 supporting the maintenance of Rome as the temporal seat of the Holy See, the basis of the independence of its spiritual authority. He died in Paris on 28 February 1863.

== Honours ==
- 19 April 1846: Grand Cross of the Legion of Honour.
- 1833: Commander in the Order of Leopold.

== Works ==
Barthe's works include:

- Réfutation de la relation du capitaine Maitland, commandant le Bellérophon, touchant l'embarquement de Napoléon, a son bord
- Projet de loi relatif aux justices de paix
- Mémoire pour les héritiers Guichard, contre la veuve et les héritiers de Chamon
- Discours et opinions de Mirabeau, précédés d'une notice historique sur sa vie
- Projet de loi tendant à modifier la composition du tribunal de première instance de la Seine
