= French Provisional Ministry of 1830 =

French government ministry of 1830

- Cabinet of France
- Date formed: 1 August 1830
- Date dissolved: 11 August 1830

People and organisations
- Head of government: Louis-Philippe d'Orléans

History
- Predecessor: Paris Municipal Commission Ministry of 1830
- Successor: First ministry of Louis-Philippe

The French Provisional Ministry of 1830 was announced on 1 August 1830 by Louis-Philippe d'Orléans in his capacity as Lieutenant General of the kingdom. It replaced the Paris Municipal Commission Ministry announced the day before after the revolution in which the Bourbon Restoration monarchy was deposed. On 11 August 1830 it was replaced by the First ministry of Louis-Philippe.

== Ministers ==
On 1 August 1830 Louis-Philippe first announced that the ministers named by the Paris Municipal Commission should retain their positions. Later that day he announced various changes. The ministers were:

Portfolio	Holder	Party
President of the Council of Ministers; Lieutenant-General of the Realm	The Duke of Orléans	None
Ministers
Minister of the Interior	François Guizot	Orléanist
Minister of Justice	Jacques-Charles Dupont	Orléanist
Minister of Foreign Affairs	General The Count Jourdan	Indifferent/Constitutional
Minister of War	Marshal Count Gérard	Orléanist
Minister of the Navy	Admiral Count of Rigny	None
Minister of Finance	The Baron Louis	Orléanist
Minister of Public Education	The Baron Bignon	Indifferent/Constitutional

== Sources ==
- France (1831). Bulletin des lois de la République franc̜aise. Imprimerie nationale.
- Muel, Léon (1891). Gouvernements, ministères et constitutions de la France depuis cent ans: Précis historique des révolutions, des crises ministérielles et gouvernementales, et des changements de constitutions de la France depuis 1789 jusqu'en 1890 ... Marchal et Billard.
