= Jean Baptiste de Caux de Blacquetot =

French general

Jean Baptiste de Caux de Blacquetot (French: [ʒɑ̃batist də ko də blakto]; 24 May 1723, Montreuil, Pas-de-Calais – 8 September 1796) was a French general.

He was appointed Marechal de Camp on 1 March 1780, and Lieutenant General on 20 May 1791.

His son was Louis Victor de Caux de Blacquetot.
