= Jean-Paul, comte de Schramm =

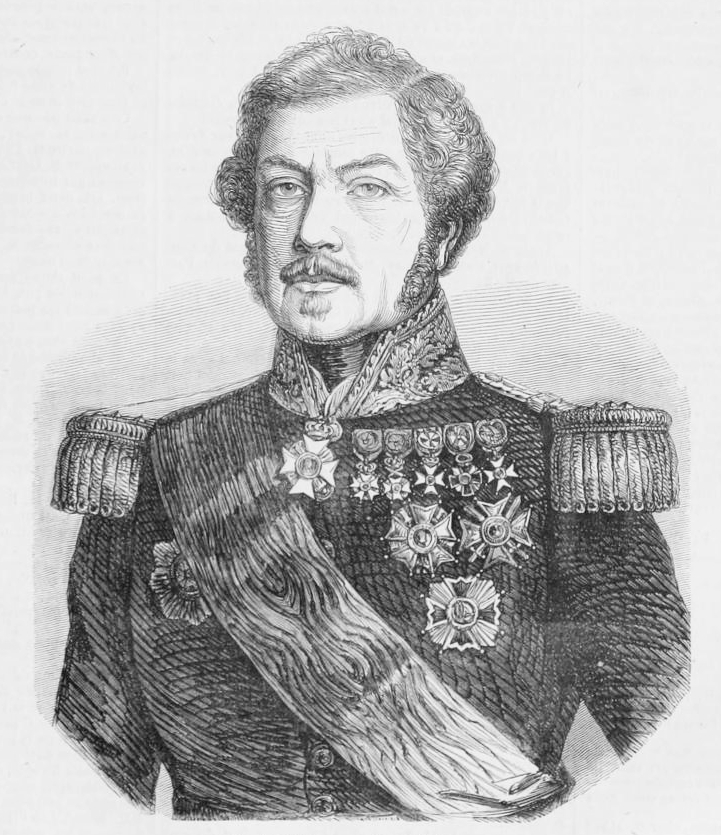
Jean-Paul, comte de Schramm.

Jean Paul Adam, comte de Schramm (1 December 1789, Arras – 25 February 1884, Paris) was a French Minister of War.

== Career ==
He entered the Army in 1803. He was promoted lieutenant after the Battle of Austerlitz. He was promoted Captain in the Old Guard, after the Siege of Danzig (1807). He fought at the Battle of Wagram, and Battle of Aspern-Essling, and the Russian campaign and Saxon campaign. He was made Baron after his charge at Battle of Lützen (1813), where he was twice wounded. He fought at the Battle of Dresden, where he captured some guns. He was made brigadier in 1813. He retired during the Bourbon Restoration, but took part in the siege of Antwerp in 1831. He commanded an expedition in Algeria in 1838. He was made lieutenant general, comte, and peer of France, in 1839. He was created Senator in 1852.

Schramm's is one of the names inscribed under the Arc de Triomphe.

Political offices
Preceded by Alphonse Henri, comte d'Hautpoul	Minister of War; 22 October 1850 – 9 January 1851	Succeeded by Auguste Regnaud de Saint-Jean d'Angély
