= Louis Victor de Caux de Blacquetot =

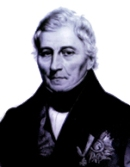
Louis Victor de Blacquetot de Caux

Louis Victor de Blacquetot de Caux (French: [lwi viktɔʁ də ko də blakto]; 23 May 1773 in Douai – 6 June 1845, Saint-Germain-en-Laye) was a Lieutenant-General of Engineering, State Councilor, Minister, Commander of St. Louis and the Legion of Honor.

== Life ==
He was the son of Jean Baptiste de Caux de Blacquetot. He studied at College of Juilly, and he joined the Army, a second lieutenant in the engineers on 1 March 1793. He was in the campaign of the armies of the Ardennes, the Rhine, and Moselle. He distinguished himself in fighting at the Battle of Erbach, Dillingen, at the Battle of Neresheim and crossing the Danube, and at Korich, and Bourgrieden.

He was appointed Battalion commander in 1799, and was appointed by Moreau, to settle with the Ferdinand, Graf Bubna von Littitz, an armistice on the streets of Ulm, Ingolstadt and Philipsburg, occupied by the Austrians. In 1800 he married the flower painter Iphigénie Milet-Moreau, the daughter of Louis Marie de Milet de Mureau. He was employed successively to the Army Reserve in 1806, where he served as Chief of Staff, Engineer.

In 1807 he directed the personnel offices of the Department of War, and equipment of the imperial corps of engineers. He was one of the senior officers at the Walcheren Campaign. In 1813, he was awarded, the title of baron and the rank of colonel. During the invasion, he was commissioned by the Duc de Richelieu to settle with the occupation of foreign troops on French territory.

He was appointed a brigadier on 20 April 1814, Director of military and police and State Councilor in 1817, Viscount and Commander of St. Louis in 1817 and Lieutenant-General on 30 July 1823. He was Minister of War from 21 January 1828 to 8 August 1829. He created a supreme council of war under the presidency of the Dauphin Louis Antoine, Duke of Angoulême. He was named Peer of France in 1832.

He died in June 1845 at the age of 70 years.

Political offices
Preceded by Aimé, duc de Clermont-Tonnerre	Minister of War; 4 January 1828 – 8 August 1829	Succeeded by Louis-Auguste-Victor, Count de Ghaisnes de Bourmont
