= Four Sergeants of La Rochelle =

1822 French soldiers' plot to overthrow the monarchy

The Four Sergeants hearing their sentence

The Four Sergeants of La Rochelle (French: Quatre sergents de La Rochelle) were a group of French soldiers who plotted to overthrow the French monarchy of the Bourbon Restoration. Sergeants Bories, Pommier, Gobin and Raoulx were associates of the revolutionary Charbonnerie, a French secret society modelled after the Italian Carbonari. After being arrested for political conspiracy and membership of an outlawed organization, the four were guillotined in Paris on 21 September 1822.

== Conspirators ==
After the 45th line regiment was formed in Chartres in 1816, Colonel Toustain replaced senior captains of the Empire with royalists. The non-commissioned officers, nostalgic for the Grand Army of Napoleon, were hostile to this. In 1821 under the Restoration, the 45th infantry regiment stationed in Paris worried the military and civil authorities because of its poor spirit. In particular, the soldiers refused to shout "Long live the King". To cut off the regiment from negative political influences (the barracks were located in the Latin Quarter of Paris, where students often protested), the regiment was transferred to La Rochelle in January 1822.

Like many soldiers hostile to the Restoration, four young sergeants named Jean-François Bories, Jean-Joseph Pomier, Marius-Claude Raoulx and Charles Goubin, aged 26, 25, 24 and 20 respectively, founded a secret society within their unit.

The charismatic Bories recruited from both non-commissioned officers and soldiers. Before leaving for La Rochelle, most of the regiment's non-commissioned officers had also joined the secret society, similar to the Carbonari of Italy.

General Jean Baptiste Berton's insurrection began without the support of the 45th regiment on 23 February. Berton's consequent failure sowed doubt among the 45th regiment. In March, Sergeant-Major Pomier, who took command in Bories’s absence, was arrested. Sergeant Auguste Goupillon helped him escape for a few hours for a secret meeting with General Berton, while on the run. Goupillon was later caught and gave a minimalist written confession, which was enough to arrest the main collaborators.

== Trial ==
They were arrested on 19 March 1822 due to indiscretion and were among a number of people accused of belonging to the Carbonari, a revolutionary group. Bories was assigned to a group that included thirteen other soldiers and four civilians who appeared before a special jury.

The trial opening was set on 21 August 1822, and was followed closely by the public as the liberal press launched a large media campaign following the case. Defended by Joseph Mérilhou, Bories denied the accusation and refused to admit guilt, as did Raoul and Goubin. Pommier was the only one who admitted to attending a Carbonari meeting. All four refused to cooperate by giving names of their associates in the Charbonnerie in exchange for being spared from execution.

The Advocate General, Louis Antoine François de Marchangy, demanded their execution, starting with Bories, whom he considered to be the leader of the conspiracy.

Marchangy alluded to Mérilhou when he said in his indictment,

"Here the real culprits are not those in the dock, but those on the advocates' bench."

The court deliberated, then announced the death penalty for the four sergeants. They were executed the next day in the place de Grève, in Paris.

== Legacy ==
The four sergeants became heroes among the Carbonari in Italy. The flag used by the Four Sergeants was once owned by Prince Jérôme Bonaparte. It is a French Tricolor bearing the slogans Constitution and Napoleon II on one side and Honour and Fatherland on the other. The flag was used by the Carbonari ventes between 1821 and 1822. It was seen during the plot of the 29th line regiment in Belfort, then in Paris, and finally in La Rochelle where it was preserved. It passed through the hands of Lieutenant-Colonel Caron, then to M. Dubourjal, then to Marquis d'Audan who finally offered it to Prince Napoleon in 1888.

The restaurant "Les Quatre Sergents" in La Rochelle is named after them.
