= Joseph Mérilhou =

French lawyer, magistrate and politician

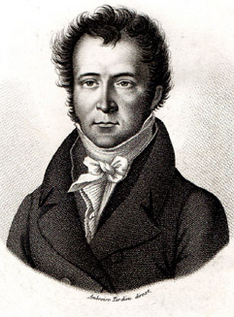
- Mérilhou in 1835
- Born: 15 October 1788; Montignac, Dordogne, France
- Died: 18 October 1856 (aged 68); Neuilly-sur-Seine, Hauts-de-Seine, France
- Occupations: Lawyer, magistrate, politician
- Known for: July Monarchy Minister

Joseph Mérilhou (15 October 1788 – 18 October 1856) was a French lawyer, magistrate and politician. He was Minister of Public Education and Religious Affairs, and then Minister of Justice in the Cabinet of Jacques Laffitte (2 November 1830 to 13 March 1831).

== Early years ==
Joseph Mérilhou was born in Montignac, in the Périgord region, on 15 October 1788. He was the son of Jean Mérilhou and Madeleine Desmond. He studied the classics in Périgueux. He qualified as an advocate from the school of law in Paris. He became an advocate in the First French Empire, and was an assistant procurer-general in the Court of Paris during the Hundred Days.

== Bourbon Restoration ==
After the Bourbon Restoration Mérilhou was placed on the list of magistrates suspended from their functions, and was obliged to leave Paris for several months. After returning he rejoined the bar and took part in the struggles of the constitutional opposition. In 1817 he defended Comte and Dunoyer, editors of the Censeur, against the correctional tribunal. He was one of the founders of Society of Friends of Press Freedom. Mérilhou defended the Duclos brothers at the court of assizes in Paris when they were accused of being part of the "black pin" conspiracy. He also defended Arnold Scheffer, Brissot and Feret, trying to show in each of his pleadings the need to place the institutions of France in harmony with what he thought was the spirit of the Charter of 1814.

On 14 July 1819 Mérilhou won the first case pleaded before a jury, that of Gossuin, editor of the Bibliothèque historique, charged for having criticized the Swiss in the king's guard. As a member of a company responsible for helping the families of citizens in preventative detention, he was prosecuted for this activity. He was defended by Dupin the Elder and discharged on 23 June 1820. Mérilhou was a leader of the Carbonari. He defended Bories, one of the four Sergeants of La Rochelle, in August 1822. The Advocate General Louis Antoine François de Marchangy alluded to him when he said in his indictment, "Here the real culprits are not those in the dock, but those on the benches of advocates."

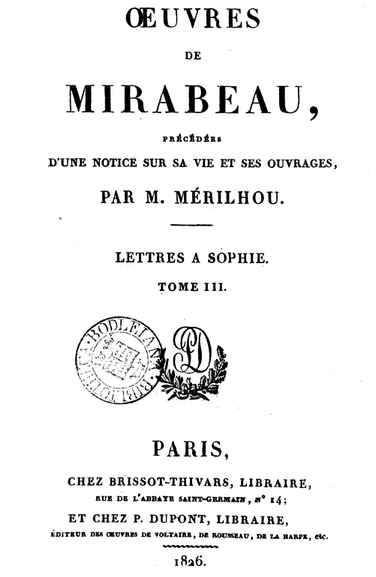

Mérilhou defended La Tribune de la Gironde in 1822 and Le Courrier français in 1825 and 1829. He supported the attacks by Montlosier against the "priests' party", and was one of the signatories to the Consultation of 1 August 1826. In 1827 he published a book about the life and works of Honoré Gabriel Riqueti, comte de Mirabeau, the great orator and supporter of a constitutional monarchy. Mérilhou was violently opposed to the ministry of Jules de Polignac and recommended refusal to pay taxes.

== July Monarchy ==
Mérilhou played an active role in the July Revolution. It was due to his advocacy that on 28 July 1830 the Commercial Court of Paris allowed the printing of newspapers despite the ordinances. On 29 July 1830 Mérilhou was appointed to the Municipal Commission of Paris, and two days later was appointed provisional secretary-general of the ministry of Justice. He was made a Councillor of State on 20 August 1830. At the Ministry of Justice he undertook various important measures such as renewal of prosecutors and justices of the peace and abolition of the Ministry of State and the office of the seal of titles. He prepared for the vote the law of 11 October 1830 that abolished the "sacrilege" law of 1825 which punished profaners of consecrated hosts with death.

On 2 November 1830 Mérilhou replaced Victor de Broglie as Minister of Public Education in the cabinet of Jacques Laffitte. On 27 December he replaced Jacques-Charles Dupont de l'Eure as Minister of Justice. He left the ministry on 13 March 1831. Mérilhou was elected deputy for four constituencies, and chose Sarthe. He sat in the Chamber of Deputies from 1831 to 1834. He became a member of the Court of Cassation in 1832. In 1837 he entered the Chamber of Peers. After the February Revolution he lost his seat in the Court of Cassation, but was restored to this position by a decree of 10 August 1849.

Mérilhou died in Neuilly-sur-Seine, Hauts-de-Seine, on 18 October 1856.

== Works ==
- Mirabeau, Honoré Gabriel Riquetti; Mérilhou, Joseph (1825). Œuvres de Mirabeau, précédées d'une notice par Mérilhou.
- Mirabeau, Honoré-Gabriel de; Mérilhou, Joseph (1827). Des prisons d'état. Dupont.
- Mérilhou, Joseph (1844). Rapport fait à la Chambre des Pairs par M. Mérilhou, au nom d'une commissionpéciale chargée de l'examen du projet de loi tendant à modifier les articles 2 et 3 de la loi du 24 avril 1833 sur le régime législatif des colonies, présenté dans la séance du 3 juillet 1844. impr. de Firmin-Didot frères.

== Sources ==
- "Mérilhou". L'Institut français de l'Éducation.
- "MERILHOU (Joseph)". IFE.
- Robert, Adolphe; Couchy, Gaston (1891). "MÉRILHOU (Joseph)". Dictionnaire des Parlementaires Français comprenant tous les membres des Assemblées Françaises et tous les Ministres Français depuis le 1er mai 1789 jusqu'au 1er mai 1889 (PDF). Bourloton.
