= Minister of Worship (France) =

The Minister of Worship (or "Minister of Public Worship", or "Minister of Ecclesiastical Affairs") was a cabinet member in the Government of France responsible for overseeing the French government's relationship with religions. An area of particular attention was the Roman Catholic Church's role in public education, and the portfolio of Minister of Worship was frequently combined with "Minister of Public Education". After the founding of the Third Republic in 1871, the Jules Ferry laws and the 1905 law on the separation of the State and the Church, the Minister of Worship was combined with the Minister of Interior. Thus, it is in that quality that the previous Interior Minister Nicolas Sarkozy created in 2003 the CFCM.

== Ministers of Worship ==
- Jean Étienne Marie Portalis 11 July 1804 – 25 August 1807
- Félix-Julien-Jean Bigot de Préameneu 4 January 1808 – 1 April 1814
- Denis Luc Antoine, comte Frayssinous 26 August 1824 – 3 March 1828
- François Jean Hyacinthe Feutrier 3 March 1828 – 8 August 1829
- Guillaume Isidore, comte de Montbel 8 August 1829 – 18 November 1829
- Martial, comte de Guernon-Ranville 18 November 1829 – 31 July 1830
- Victor de Broglie (1785–1870) 11 August 1830 – 2 November 1830
- Joseph Mérilhou 2 November 1830 – 27 November 1830
- Félix Barthe 27 November 1830 – 13 March 1831
- Marthe Camille Bachasson, comte de Montalivet 13 March 1831 – 30 April 1832
- Louis Gaspard Amédée, baron Girod de l'Ain30 April 1832 – 11 October 1832
- Antoine, comte d'Argout 31 December 1832 – 4 April 1834
- Jean-Charles Persil 4 April 1834 – 22 February 1836
- Paul Sauzet 22 February 1836 – 6 September 1836
- Jean Persil 6 September 1836 – 15 April 1837
- Félix Barthe 15 April 1837 – 31 March 1839
- Louis Gaspard Amédée, baron Girod de l'Ain 31 March 1839 – 12 May 1839
- Jean-Baptiste Teste 12 May 1839 – 1 March 1840
- Alexandre-François Vivien 1 March 1840 – 29 October 1840
- Nicolas Martin du Nord 29 October 1840 – 12 March 1847
- Michel Pierre Alexis Hébert14 March 1847 – 24 February 1848
- Hippolyte Carnot 24 February 1848 – 11 May 1848
- Eugène Bethmont 11 May 1848 – 28 June 1848
- Hippolyte Carnot 28 June 1848 – 5 July 1848
- Achille Tenaille de Vaulabelle 5 July 1848 – 13 October 1848
- Alexandre Pierre Freslon 13 October 1848 – 20 December 1848
- Alfred Frédéric, comte de Falloux 20 December 1848 – 31 October 1849
- Marie Louis Pierre Félix Esquirou de Parieu 31 October 1849 – 24 January 1851
- Charles Giraud 24 January 1851 – 10 April 1851
- Marie Jean Pierre Pie Frédéric Dombidau de Crouseilhes 10 April 1851 – 26 October 1851
- Charles Giraud 26 October 1851 – 3 December 1851
- Hippolyte Fortoul 3 December 1851 – 7 June 1856
- Gustave Rouland 13 August 1856 – 23 June 1863
- Pierre Jules Baroche 23 June 1863 – 17 July 1869
- Jean-Baptiste Duvergier 17 July 1869 – 2 January 1870
- Émile Ollivier 2 January 1870 – 10 August 1870
- Michel Grandperret 10 August 1870 – 4 September 1870
- Jules Simon 5 September 1870 – 17 May 1873
- Oscar Bardi de Fourtou 18 May 1873 – 25 May 1873
- Anselme Batbie 25 May 1873 – 26 November 1873
- Oscar Bardi de Fourtou 26 November 1873 – 22 May 1874
- Arthur de Cumont 22 May 1874 – 10 March 1875
- Henri Wallon 10 March 1875 – 9 March 1876
- Louis Martel 12 December 1876 – 17 May 1877
- Joseph Brunet 17 May 1877 – 23 November 1877
- Hervé Faye 23 November 1877 – 13 December 1877
- Agénor Bardoux 13 December 1877 – 4 February 1879
- Émile de Marcère 4 February 1879 – 4 March 1879
- Charles Lepère 4 March 1879 – 17 May 1880
- Ernest Constans 17 May 1880 – 14 November 1881
- Paul Bert 14 November 1881 – 30 January 1882
- Gustave Humbert 30 January 1882 – 7 August 1882
- Paul Devès 7 August 1882 – 13 September 1882
- Armand Fallières 13 September 1882 – 21 February 1883
- René Waldeck-Rousseau 21 February 1883 – 27 February 1883
- Félix Martin-Feuillée 27 February 1883 – 6 April 1885
- René Goblet 6 April 1885 – 30 May 1887
- Eugène Spuller 30 May 1887 – 12 December 1887
- Léopold Faye 12 December 1887 – 3 April 1888
- Jean-Baptiste Ferrouillat 3 April 1888 – 5 February 1889
- Edmond Guyot-Dessaigne 5 February 1889 – 22 February 1889
- François Thévenet 22 February 1889 – 17 March 1890
- Armand Fallières 17 March 1890 – 27 February 1892
- Louis Ricard 27 February 1892 – 6 December 1892
- Charles Dupuy 6 December 1892 – 4 April 1893
- Raymond Poincaré 4 April 1893 – 3 December 1893
- Eugène Spuller 3 December 1893 – 30 May 1894
- Charles Dupuy 30 May 1894 – 26 January 1895
- Raymond Poincaré 26 January 1895 – 1 November 1895
- Émile Combes 1 November 1895 – 29 April 1896
- Alfred Rambaud 29 April 1896 – 26 September 1896
- Jean-Baptiste Darlan 26 September 1896 – 1 December 1897
- Victor Milliard 2 December 1897 – 28 June 1898
- Ferdinand Sarrien 28 June 1898 – 1 November 1898
- Charles Dupuy 1 November 1898 – 22 June 1899
- René Waldeck-Rousseau 22 June 1899 – 7 June 1902
- Émile Combes 7 June 1902 – 24 January 1905
- Jean-Baptiste Bienvenu-Martin 24 January 1905 – 14 March 1906
- Aristide Briand 14 March 1906 – 2 March 1911
- Ernest Monis 2 March 1911 – 27 June 1911
- Joseph Caillaux 27 June 1911 – 14 January 1912
