= Louis Marie de Milet de Mureau =

French politician

please help by adding more information

Louis Marie Antoine Destouff de Milet de Mureau baron (26 June 1756, Toulon – 6 May 1825, Paris) was a French politician. A former cadet from the École royale du génie de Mézières, he served as French Minister of Defence from 21 February to 2 July 1799 under the French Directory. His daughter Iphigénie became a flower painter.

Political offices
Preceded by Barthélemy Louis Joseph Schérer	French minister of War; 21 February 1799 – 2 July 1799	Succeeded by Jean-Baptiste Bernadotte
