= Georges Humann =

French financier and politician (1780–1842)

Jean-Georges Humann
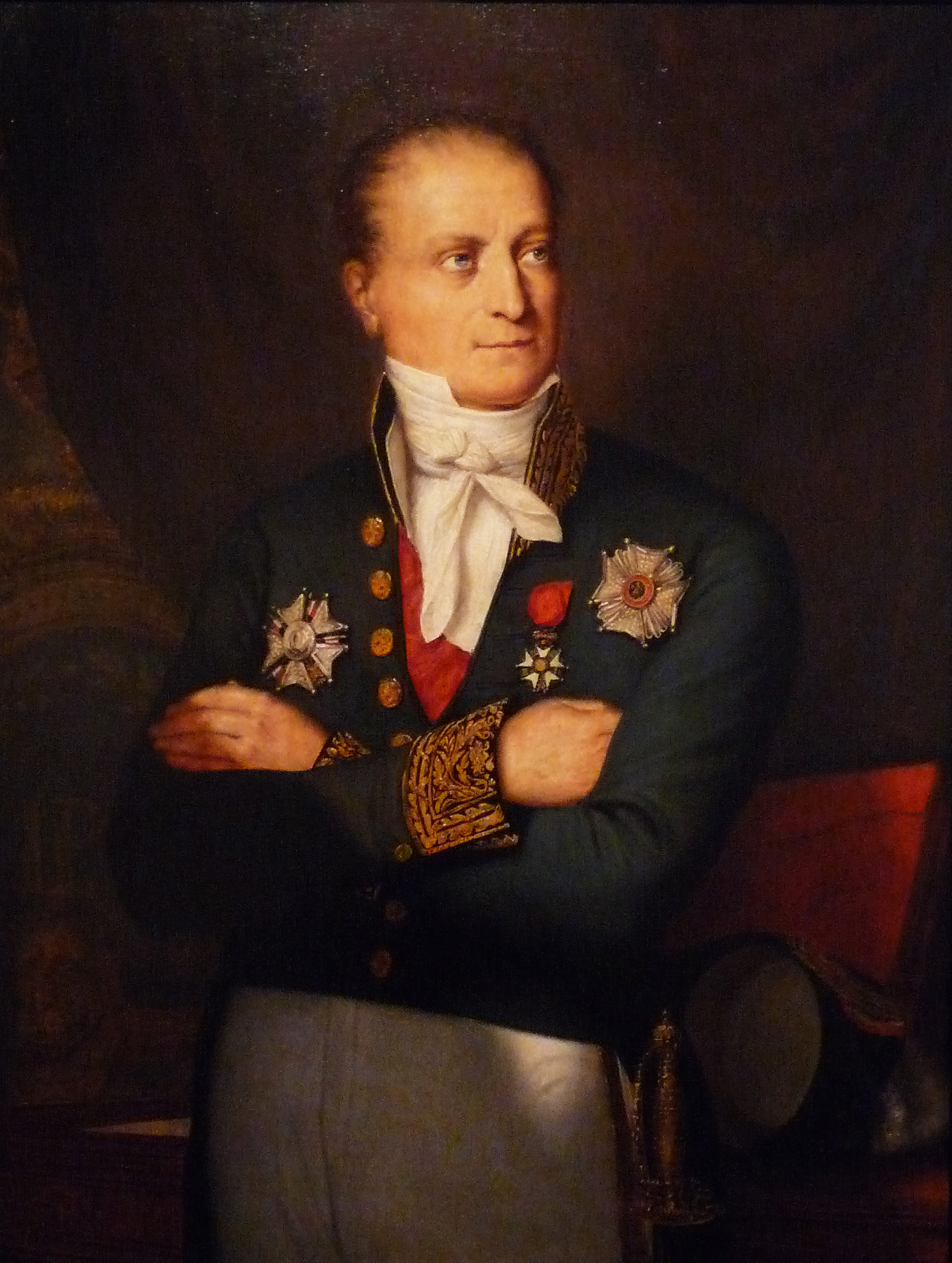
- Jean-Georges Humann by Gabriel-Christophe Guérin
- Born: 6 August 1780; Strasbourg, France
- Died: 25 April 1842 (aged 61); Paris, France
- Occupations: Financier and politician
- Known for: Minister of Finance

Jean-Georges Humann (6 August 1780 – 25 April 1842) was a French financier and politician. During the July Monarchy (1830–1848) he was several times Minister of Finance.

== Early years ==
Jean-Georges Humann was born in Strasbourg, Bas-Rhin, on 6 August 1780. His parents were Jacques Humann and Anne-Marie Schmitz. His family was German in origin. His father was a bourgeois of Strasbourg, but his family was not wealthy and his education was limited. By nature he was reserved, taciturn and laconic.

When he was fourteen Humann was apprenticed to a tobacco merchant. By the age of eighteen he and an associate were running a small trading company. In 1799 he married Louise Philippine Antoinette Breck in Strasbourg. She died two years later. On 24 August 1802 he married Madeleine Heiligenthal (1778-1836). They had four sons and two daughters.

== Entrepreneur and deputy ==
At a very young age, between 1800 and 1810, Humann acquired a considerable fortune and became a celebrity in Alsace. His wealth came from smuggling at the time of the Continental Blockade, when trade in goods of British origin was prohibited. He became in turn a member of the Strasbourg Chamber of Commerce, a judge at the commerce court in 1812, and a member of the Administrative Committee of Civil Hospices in 1816. During the famines of 1812 and 1816-17 Humann played an important role in supplying grain. In 1818 Humann led a deputation charged with presenting the grievances and demands of the Strasbourg business community to the government, with great success.

In 1820 Humann was elected a Deputy for Bas-Rhin. He soon became one of the leading supporters of economic and political liberalism, and a defender of the interests of Alsace. In January 1821 he and his associates offered to lend the money needed to complete the Rhône-Rhine canal. His maiden speech in the chamber of deputies was on 3 July 1821 in support of this project. He was involved in the debates about tobacco, speaking against a monopoly and in favor of a consumption tax. In February 1823 Humann spoke against the planned invasion of Spain, which he felt was against the interests of the Bourbons.

From the middle of the 1820s he was involved in various large or technically advanced industrial projects as a manager, organizer or source of funding. On 31 October 1825 Humann and associates obtained a salt mining concession, which proved profitable. He was appointed a member of the general council of commerce, chaired by Jean-Baptiste de Villèle, the Minister of the Interior. In November 1827 Humann failed to be reelected for Bas-Rhin. With the support of Élie, duc Decazes, a former minister of Louis XVIII, he was elected deputy for Villefranche on 30 May 1828.

== July monarchy ==
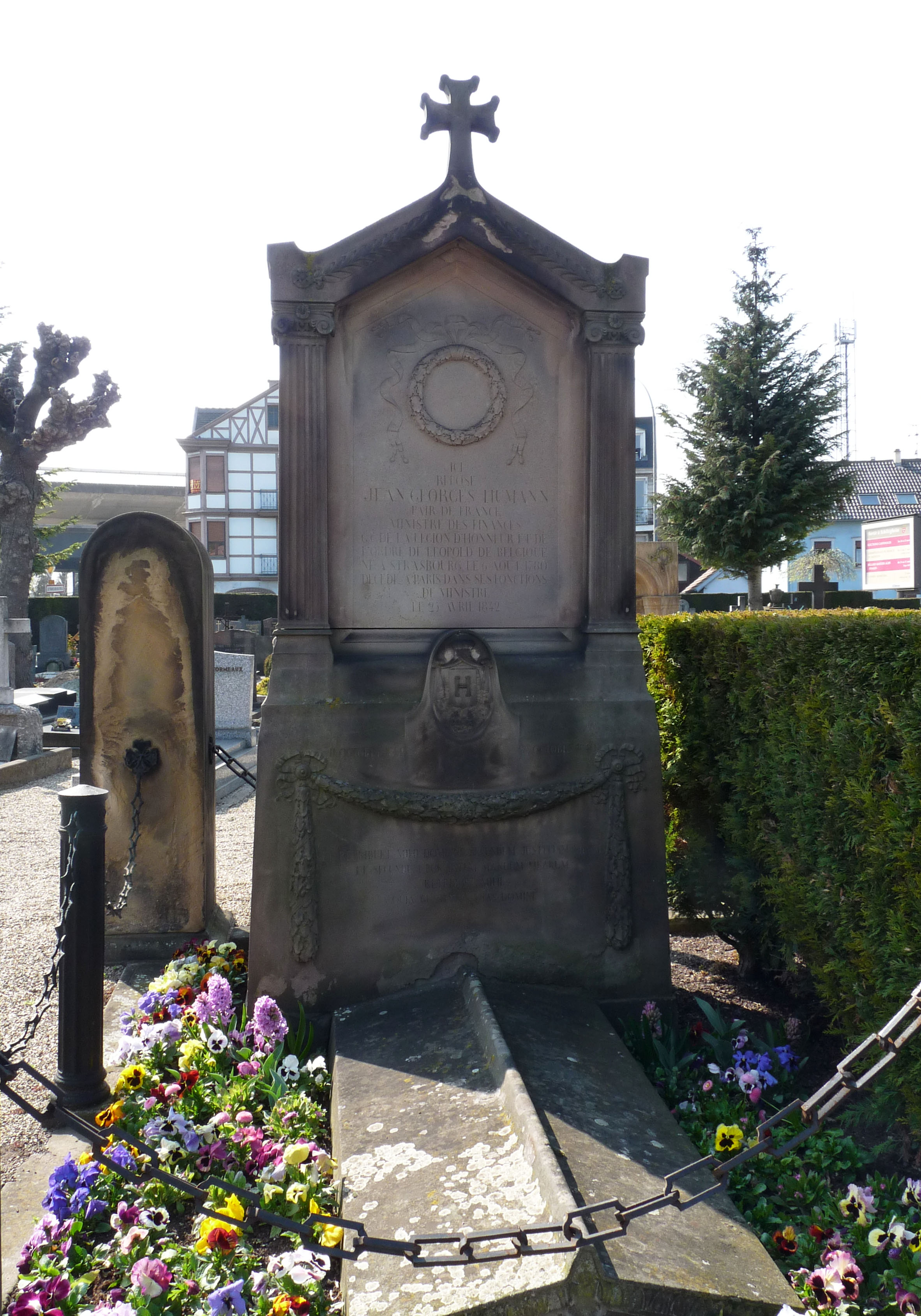
Humann's tomb in Sainte-Hélène cemetery in Strasbourg

Humann's reputation as a financial expert grew. He was made a member of the Budget Committee, and in 1830 was the rapporteur of the budget. He was reelected deputy in 1830 and 1831.

The king formed the "ministry of all talents" headed by Marshall Soult on 11 October 1832, with Humann as Minister of Finance. He held this position in successive cabinets until January 1836. Issues in the first session included the budget, loans for Haiti, spoils from the Algiers expedition and taxes on colonial and domestically produced sugar. Later sessions dealt with the guarantee of Greek debt following recognition of the independence of Greece, compensation to the United States for losses resulting from the Continental Blockade, laws related to the Bank of France and savings banks, the tobacco monopoly and pensions for civil servants.

On 14 January 1836 Humann presented the draft budget for 1837 to the Chamber of Deputies. This included a proposal for conversion of debt that had not been discussed with his cabinet colleagues. The proposal caused an unexpected storm of controversy, and Humann was forced to resign on 18 January 1836. The issue led to a public debate, followed by the collective resignation of the cabinet in February 1836.

Humann returned to Strasbourg to recuperate his health and find some peace. In October 1837 he was made a peer of France, and returned to Paris and the political scene. On 29 October 1840 he was appointed Minister of Finance in a new ministry headed by Soult. Humann was reluctant to create or raise taxes, but preferred to collect existing taxes more efficiently. The most important measure was to undertake a new census to determine wealth and property taxes owing, which resulted in virulent attacks from the opposition but was carried through to completion. Humann died of a stroke at the Finance ministry in Paris on 25 April 1842. Antoine Maurice Apollinaire d'Argout delivered a eulogy on Humann in the Chamber of Peers on 4 July 1843.

== Sources ==
- Geiger, Reed G. (1 January 1994). Planning the French Canals: Bureaucracy, Politics, and Enterprise Under the Restoration. University of Delaware Press. ISBN 978-0-87413-527-5.
- "Humann". IGPDE. 14 August 2007. Archived from the original on 25 March 2014.
- "Jean-Georges HUMANN". Geneanet.
- Spach, Louis (1871). "M. Georges Humann". Archéologie, Histoire alsatique. Berger-Levrault.
