= Marthe Camille Bachasson, Count of Montalivet =

French politician

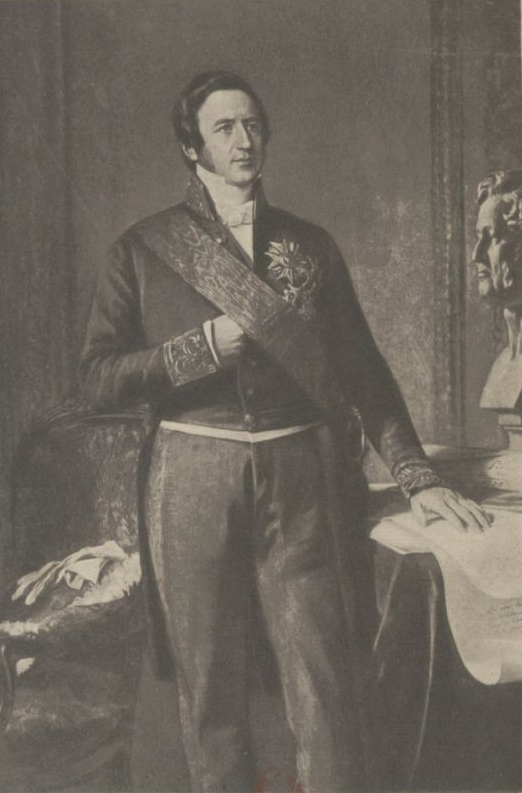
Camille de Montalivet

Marthe Camille Bachasson, 3rd Count of Montalivet (24 April 1801, Valence – 4 January 1880, Saint-Bouize) was a French statesman and a Peer of France.

== Biography ==
Second son of Jean-Pierre Bachasson, 1st count of Montalivet (1766–1823), peer of France and Minister of Emperor Napoleon, he was born in Valence, Drôme.

After the death of his father and brother in 1823, he inherited the title of count and peer of France, and was one of the youngest peers to sit in the Chamber of Peers.

=== Minister of Louis-Philippe ===
He joined promptly the July Monarchy during the July Revolution of 1830 and was called to the Ministry of the Interior in November, where his main task was to prevent any troubles during the trial of the former ministers of King Charles X. He was alternatively Minister of the Interior and Minister of Education in the different cabinets of the July Monarchy.

In 1832, he founded the Conférence Molé, a debating society that became a training ground for future political leaders.

After 1839, he became intendant of the Civil List, and created the Museum of Versailles in the walls of the Palace of Versailles, in order to reconcile France with the Ancien Régime.

=== A supporter of the July Monarchy ===
After the 1848 Revolution, he defended the action of the July Monarchy, and, as intimate friend of the former royal family, acted as executor of the will of King Louis-Philippe.

=== Rally to Republic ===
After the fall of the Second French Empire in 1870, he rallied the "conservative republican" ideas of his friend Adolphe Thiers, and thus considerably eased the vote by the centre right of the constitutional laws of 1875, establishing a Republic in France.

He held a seat in the French Senate from 1879 to his death.

== Family ==
He married on 26 January 1828 Clémentine Françoise Paillard-Duclère (Laval, 21 February 1806 - Paris, 3 March 1882), and had five daughters:

- Marie Adélaïde Bachasson de Montalivet (5 November 1828 - 14 April 1880), married in Saint-Bouize on 17 August 1847 Laurent François, Marquis de Gouvion-Saint-Cyr (30 December 1815 - 30 January 1904), son of Laurent, Marquis de Gouvion-Saint-Cyr (Toul, 13 May 1764 - Hyères, 17 March 1830) and wife Anne de Gouvion (Toul, 2 November 1775 - Paris, 18 June 1844), and had issue
- Adélaïde Joséphine Bachasson de Montalivet (Paris, 16 December 1830 - Paris, 14 December 1920), married in Saint-Bouize on 6 November 1850 Antoine Achille Masson, dit de Montalivet (Meurthe-et-Moselle, Nancy, 27 June 1815 - Villedieu, 31 October 1882), son of Georges Masson, vice mayor of Nancy in 1814, and wife Claire Felaize, and had issue
- Camille Bachasson de Montalivet (1 September 1832 - Menton, 4 February 1887), married on 28 November 1849 Théodore du Moncel (1821–1884) and had female issue
- Marie Amélie Bachasson de Montalivet (10 January 1837 - 15 March 1899), married in Paris on 16 May 1861 François Gustave Adolphe Guyot de Villeneuve (25 October 1825 - Paris, 22 March 1899), son of François-Pierre Guyot de Villeneuve and wife Joséphine Victoire Pelon, and had issue
- Marie Adélaïde Marthe Bachasson de Montalivet (Paris, 9 October 1844 - Paris, 2 August 1914), married in Saint-Bouize on 19 June 1865 Georges Marie René Picot (Paris, 24 December 1838 - Allevard, Isère, 16 August 1909), son of Charles Picot (Orléans, 4 August 1795 - Paris, 31 January 1870) and wife Henriette Bidois (Paris, 1799 - Paris, 19 November 1862), and had issue; they are the great-grandparents in female line of Valéry Giscard d'Estaing.

== Trivia ==
- There is a Camille de Montalivet Lane in Valence, Drôme.
- The rose "Comte de Montalivet" was also named after him. This rose, of the Hybrid Perpetual class, was created in 1846 from the seeds of William Jesse, and its colours marry red and purple.

Preceded by François Guizot	French Minister of the Interior; 1830–1831	Succeeded by Casimir Pierre Perier
Preceded by Casimir Pierre Perier	French Minister of the Interior; 1832–1832	Succeeded by Adolphe Thiers
Preceded by Adolphe Thiers	French Minister of the Interior; 1836–1836	Succeeded by Adrien de Gasparin
Preceded by Adrien de Gasparin	French Minister of the Interior; 1837–1839	Succeeded by Adrien de Gasparin
