= Jean-Charles Persil =

French politician

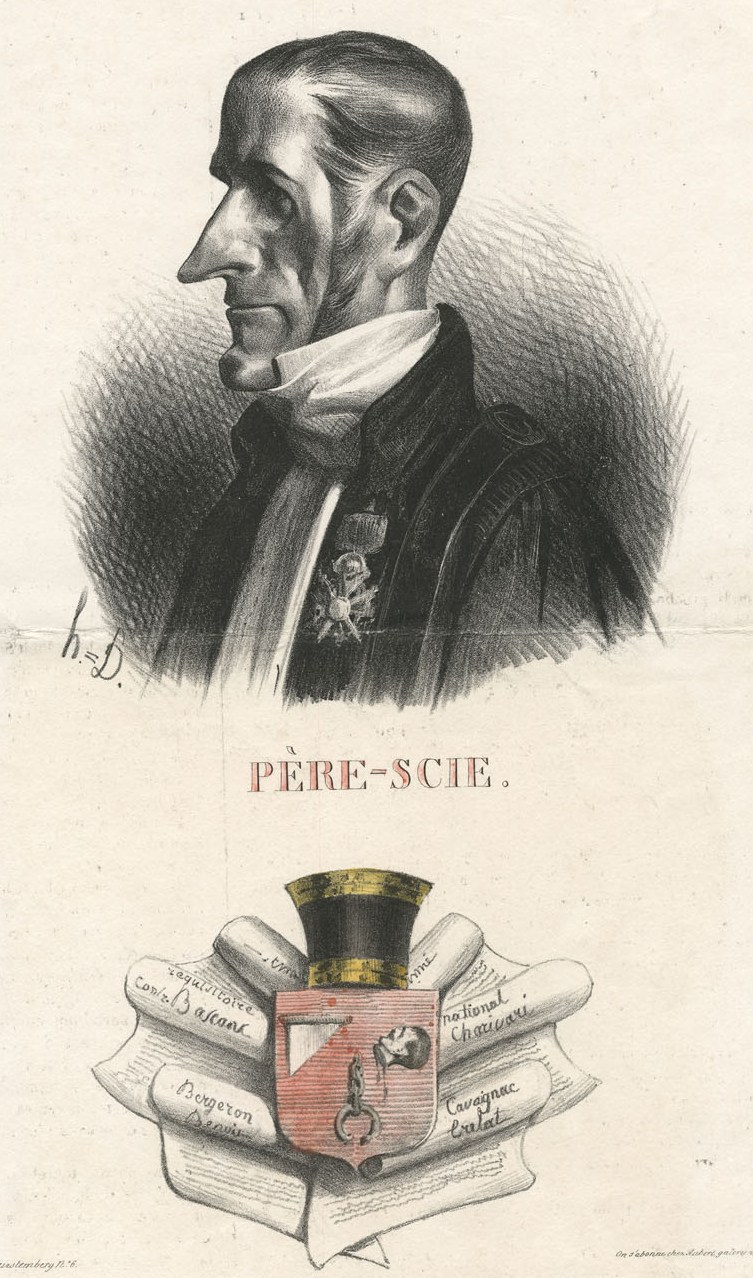
- Caricature by Honoré Daumier from La Caricature (1833)
- Born: 13 October 1785; Condom, Gers, France
- Died: 10 July 1870 (aged 84); Antony, Hauts-de-Seine, France

Jean-Charles Persil (13 October 1785 – 10 July 1870) was a French politician. He was Minister of Justice and Religious Affairs (1834–1837) during the July Monarchy, a peer of France (1839) and Councillor of State (1852).

== Early years ==
Jean-Charles Persil was born in Condom, Gers, on 13 October 1785. His parents were Jean-Joseph Persil, a merchant and bourgeois, and Marie Denux. He was destined for the bar. He came to Paris early, studied law for one year and was received as a doctor in 1806. He published a book on mortgages in 1809, followed by one on privileges and mortgages in 1812. He considered teaching law, and competed for a chair at Grenoble and at Paris. He was admitted to the bar and he earned a solid reputation as a jurist. Under the Bourbon Restoration (1815-1830) Persil participated in the struggles of the Liberal party. He defended his friend Nicolas Bavoux before the Court of Peers.

== July Monarchy ==
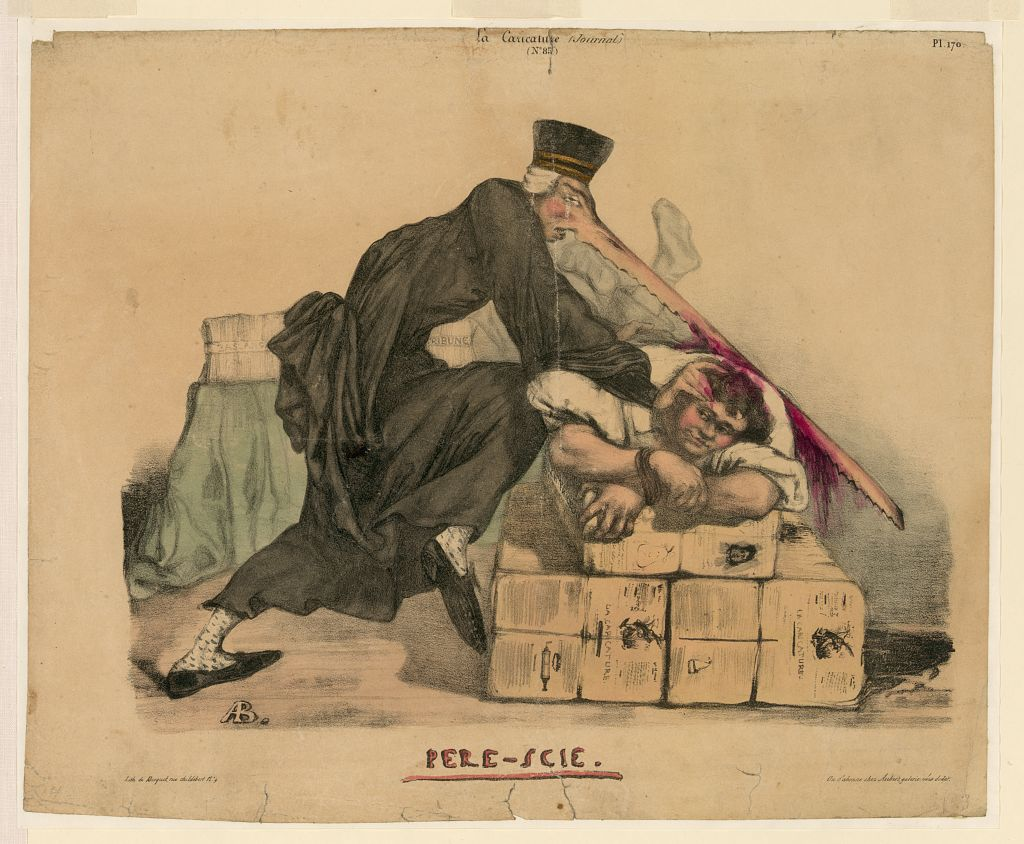
An 1832 cartoon depicting Persil attacking the editor of La Caricature with his huge saw-like nose

Persil was elected deputy for the 2nd district of Gers (Condom) on 23 June 1830. He protested against the ordinances of Charles X of France, and supported making the Duke of Orleans Lieutenant-General of the kingdom. He concurred with the establishment of the July Monarchy of Louis Philippe I. He was appointed general counsel at the royal court of Paris. On 8 November 1830 he was reelected for the fourth district of Gers (Lombez). As deputy and magistrate Persil supported the conservatives and fought the democratic liberal party with great energy. He attacked the republican clubs and newspapers, denounced conspiracies and meted out severe punishments. He became a target of hostile cartoonists, who gave him a huge saw-shaped nose.

On 4 April 1834 Persil was called by Louis Philippe to replace Félix Barthe as Minister of Justice and Religious Affairs. He ran again for election due to this appointment, and was returned on 15 May 1834 and then on 21 June 1834 in three districts, choosing to represent Condom. He remained minister until 22 February 1836. He was again minister from 6 September 1836 to 15 April 1837 in the first cabinet of Louis Mathieu Molé. He resigned when Molé refused to dissolve the chamber. He was made president of the committee on currency, but was forced to resign early in 1839.

Persil was again elected Deputy on 4 November 1837 and on 2 March 1839. He was made a Peer of France on 7 November 1839. On 24 April 1845 he was made a Grand Officer of the Legion of Honor. Until 1848 he supported the government of Louis Philippe with his votes and speeches.

== Later career ==
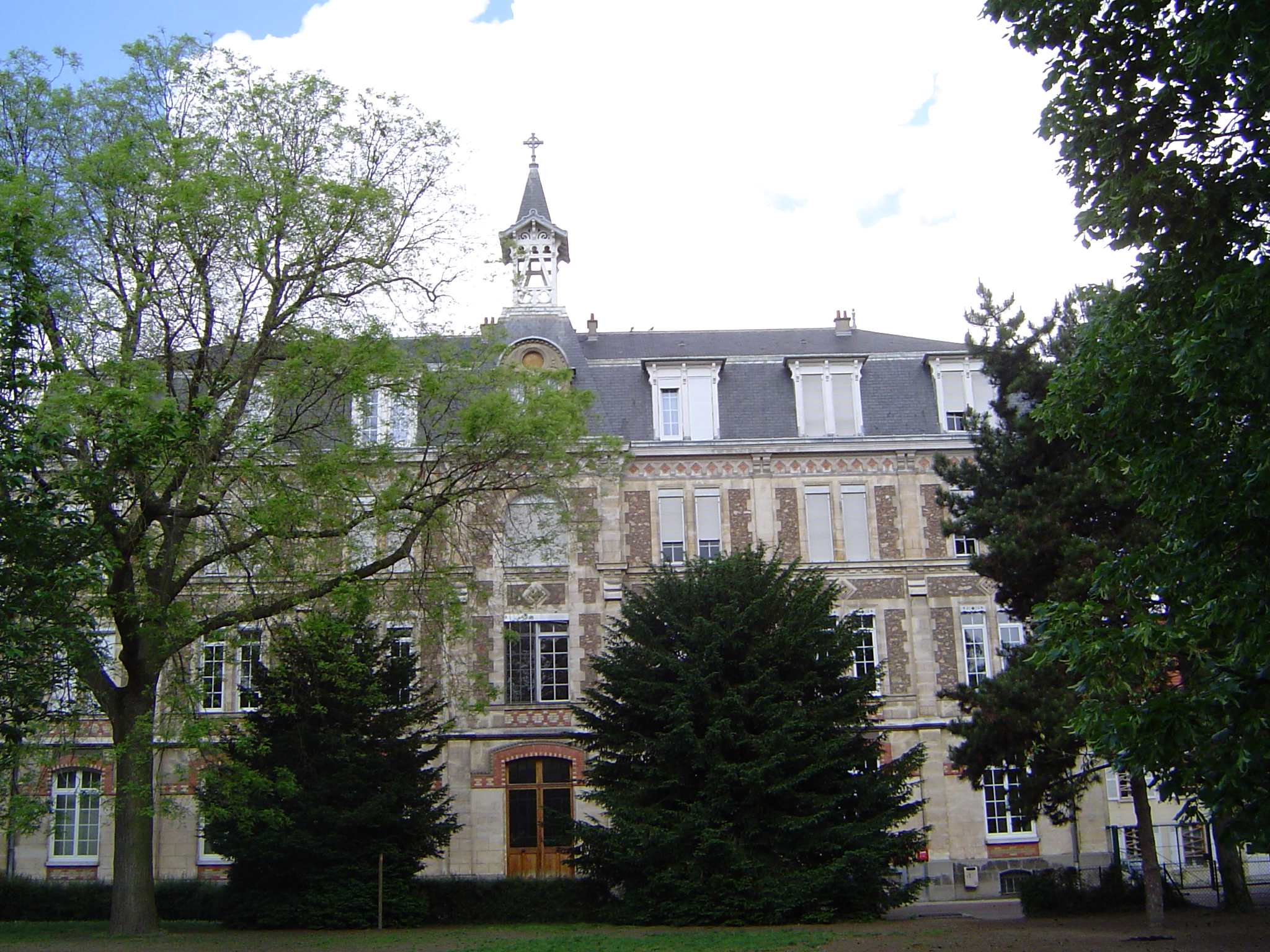
Maison St. Jean (or Maison Chénier)

After the February Revolution of 1848 Persil returned to private life. He accepted the position of Councillor of State on 31 July 1852. Persil had acquired the Maison Chénier in Antony, Hauts-de-Seine, in 1820, and had enlarged it. He made it his place of retirement. He died in Antony on 10 July 1870, aged 84.

== Works ==
- Régime hypothécaire, ou commentaire sur le XVIIIe titre du livre III du Code civil, relatif aux privilèges et hypothèques, Paris, chez P. Gueffier, 1809, in-8 (nlle. éd. augmentée 1817, 2 vol. in-8)
- Questions sur les privilèges et hypothèques, saisies immobilières et ordres, faisant suite au Régime hypothécaire; contenant la solutions des difficultés qui se présentent habituellement devant les Tribunaux, ou sur lesquelles l'Auteur a été consulté, Paris, chez P. Gueffier, 1812, 2 vol. in-8 (nlle. éd. 1820)
- Dissertation sur le rétablissement du droit d'aînesse et des substitutions, Paris, Baudouin frères, 1826, in-8
- Lettres de M. Persil, député de l'arrondissement de Condom, aux rédacteurs de ″La Presse″ et des ″Débats″ [à l'occasion de son départ de la Direction générale des monnaies], 1839
