= Antoine Maurice Apollinaire d'Argout =

French statesman and minister

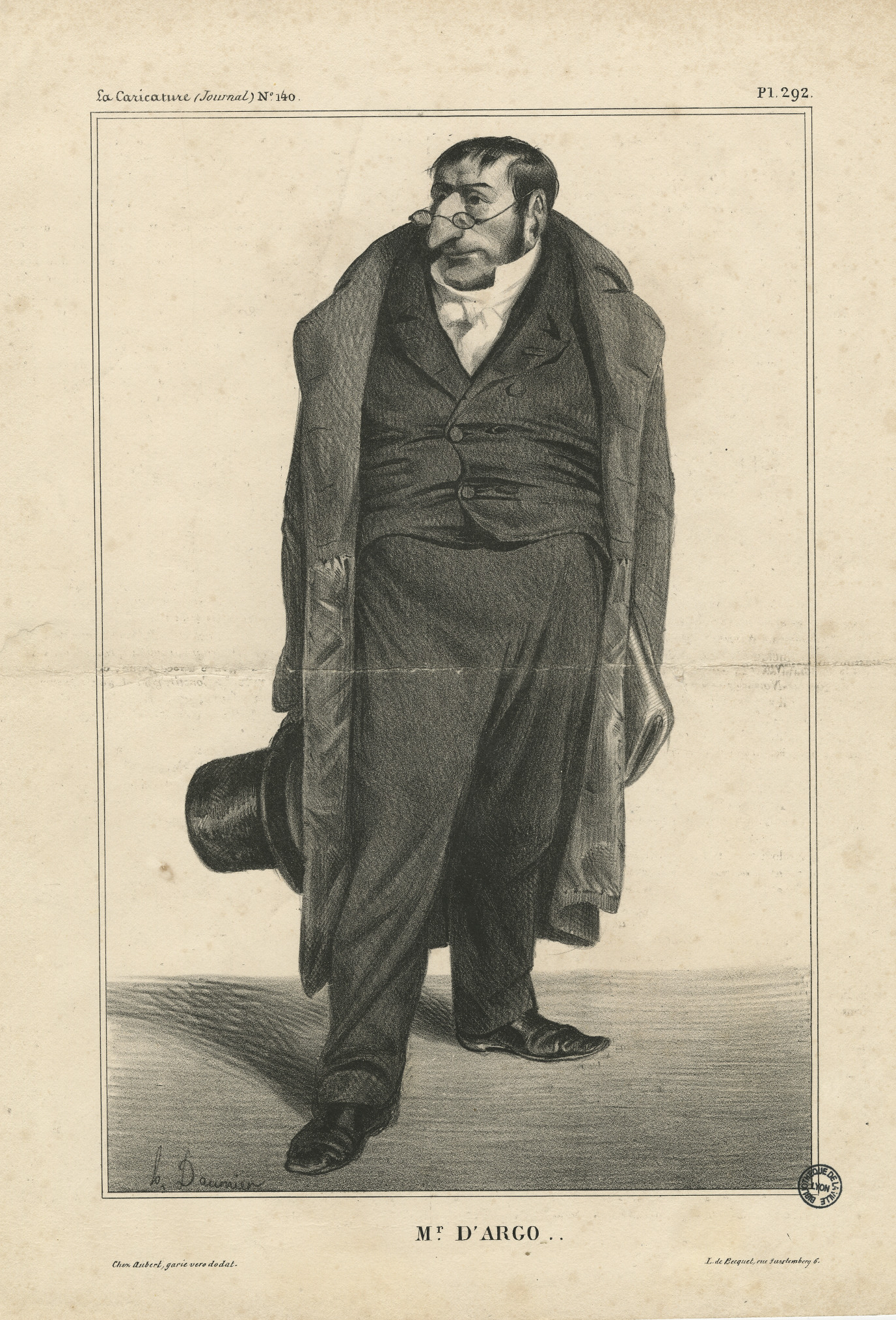
Caricature of the Comte d'Argout by Honoré Daumier.

Antoine Maurice Apollinaire, Comte d'Argout (28 August 1782, Veyssilieu, Isère – 15 January 1858, Paris) was a French statesman, minister, and governor of the Bank of France.

== Life ==
He was named Peer of France on 5 March 1819 by the Duke Decazes, and voted with the moderate right. During the July Revolution of 1830, he tried to obtain from Charles X the withdrawal of the July Ordinances which had sparked the riots. A loyal supporter to the Bourbon Restoration, the Comte d'Argout accepted, and worked with, the new July Monarchy, whose policies agreed with his moderate opinions. He was named Minister in Jacques Laffitte's government, succeeding General Sebastiani.

In April 1832, he contracted the cholera but survived it.

After several other ministerial functions, he was appointed governor of the Bank of France in 1834, which position he retained until 9 June 1857, despite the institutional changes caused by the 1848 Revolutions leading to the establishment of the Second Republic, and then the 1851 coup of Bonaparte leading to the establishment of the Second French Empire.

== See also ==
- July Monarchy
