= Resistance Party (France) =

Resistance Party Parti de la Résistance
- Leader: Casimir Périer; Adolphe Thiers; François Guizot
- Founded: 1832; 194 years ago
- Dissolved: 1848; 178 years ago
- Merger of: Doctrinaires
- Merged into: Party of Order
- Newspaper: Journal des débats La Presse
- Ideology: Conservatism (French); Liberal conservatism Orléanism
- Political position: Centre-right
- Colours: Blue

The Resistance Party (French: Parti de la Résistance) was a centre-right conservative Orléanist political group during the July Monarchy.

The party sat on the centre-right of the Chamber of Deputies, to the left of the Legitimists, but to the right of the republican opposition, the centre-left Movement Party and the centrist Third Party.

== History ==
The Resistance Party came to power with Casimir Pierre Périer in 1831 and would remain there essentially until the end of the reign. At the head of the government since March 1831, Périer brought in the army against the Lyons canuts. This revolt took place in the working-class districts of Lyons. The rioters brandished the black flag by chanting "live by working or dying while fighting".

After the death of Périer in 1832, his associate François Guizot became the party leader. He imposed a peaceful foreign policy and a conservative domestic policy. This government was unpopular in 1840 because to consolidate the regime the government did not hesitate to corrupt parliament. In the elections of 1842, the Guizot government imposed itself by a favorable economic situation.

However, the tension between workers and industrialists became too strong and revolts exploded. King Louis Philippe I removed Guizot from power in 1847. Louis-Mathieu Molé was appointed briefly as Prime Minister, attempting to repress the revolution, but he failed. The monarchy was abolished and the new French Republic was born in 1848.

Many members of the Resistance Party, like other parliamentary groups under the July Monarchy, merged in the Party of Order, a conservative expression in the new regime.

== Ideology ==
The Resistance Party believed that the liberal cause had been fulfilled by the Charter of 1830. The party envisioned the July Revolution as a means to restore order and legality after the coup d'état of Charles X, rather than as a radical break from the existing order. Their governments supported a moderate and bourgeois policy, retaining the censal system and holding a laissez-faire economic stance. The party did back some progressive measures such as the school law of 1833, which established free public education for the poor.

== Electoral results ==
Chamber of Deputies
Election year	No. of overall votes	% of overall vote	No. of overall seats won	+/–	Leader
1834	89,885 (1st)	69.5	320 / 460	▲38	Édouard Mortier
1837	20,937 (3rd)	13.8	64 / 464	▼135	François Guizot
1839	87,352 (2nd)	43.4	199 / 459	▲67	François Guizot
1842	Unknown (1st)	58.0	266 / 459	▲37	Francois Guizot
1846	155,718 (1st)	63.3	290 / 459	▲24	Francois Guizot

== See also ==
- History of France
