= 1773 =

1773 in various calendars
- Gregorian calendar: 1773; MDCCLXXIII
- Ab urbe condita: 2526
- Armenian calendar: 1222; ԹՎ ՌՄԻԲ
- Assyrian calendar: 6523
- Balinese saka calendar: 1694–1695
- Bengali calendar: 1179–1180
- Berber calendar: 2723
- British Regnal year: 13 Geo. 3 – 14 Geo. 3
- Buddhist calendar: 2317
- Burmese calendar: 1135
- Byzantine calendar: 7281–7282
- Chinese calendar: 壬辰年 (Water Dragon); 4470 or 4263 — to — 癸巳年 (Water Snake); 4471 or 4264
- Coptic calendar: 1489–1490
- Discordian calendar: 2939
- Ethiopian calendar: 1765–1766
- Hebrew calendar: 5533–5534
- Hindu calendars
- Vikram Samvat: 1829–1830
- Shaka Samvat: 1694–1695
- Kali Yuga: 4873–4874
- Holocene calendar: 11773
- Igbo calendar: 773–774
- Iranian calendar: 1151–1152
- Islamic calendar: 1186–1187
- Japanese calendar: An'ei 2 (安永２年)
- Javanese calendar: 1698–1699
- Julian calendar: Gregorian minus 11 days
- Korean calendar: 4106
- Minguo calendar: 139 before ROC 民前139年
- Nanakshahi calendar: 305
- Thai solar calendar: 2315–2316
- Tibetan calendar: ཆུ་ཕོ་འབྲུག་ལོ་ (male Water-Dragon); 1899 or 1518 or 746 — to — ཆུ་མོ་སྦྲུལ་ལོ་ (female Water-Snake); 1900 or 1519 or 747

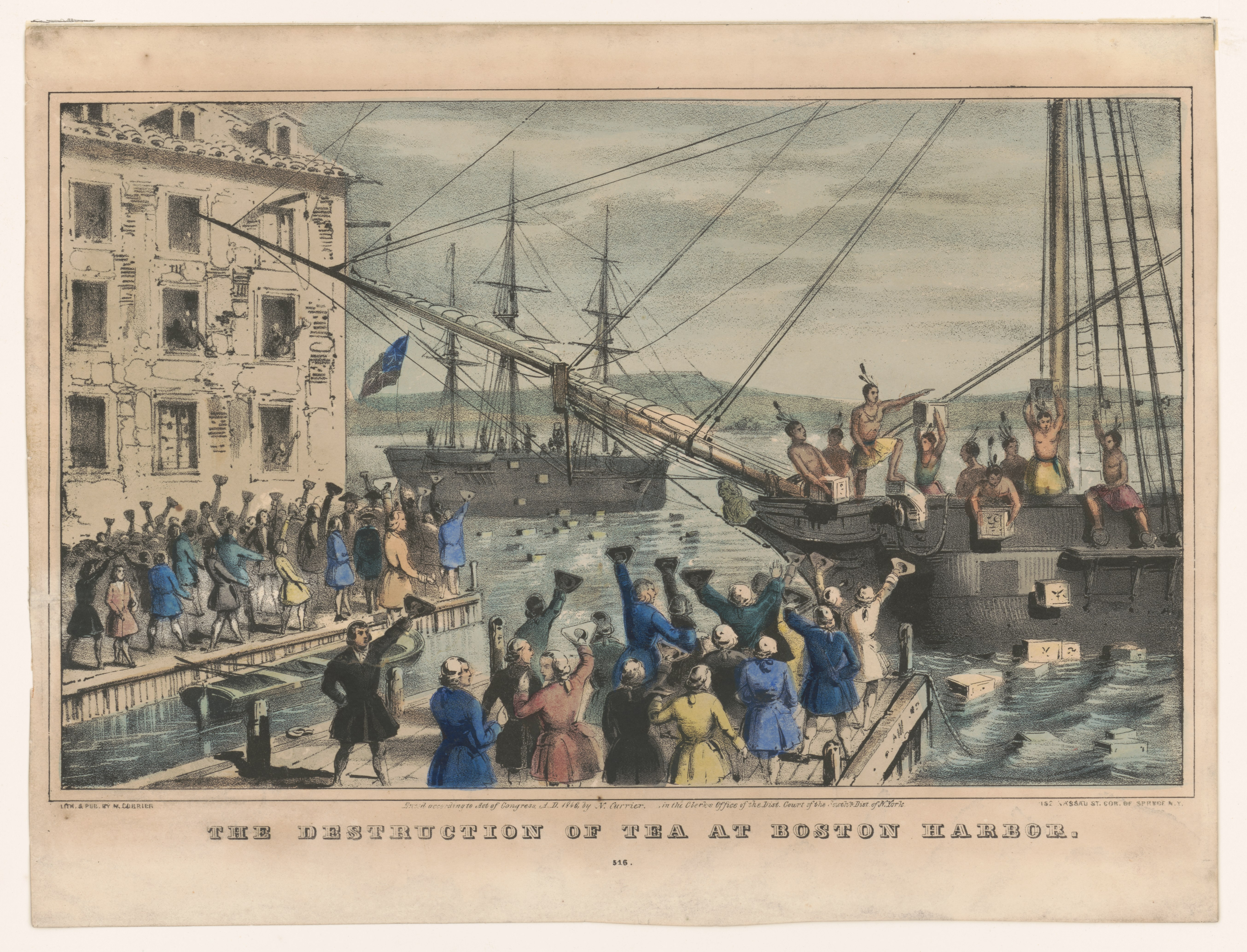
December 16: American protesters stage "Boston Tea Party"

1773 (MDCCLXXIII) was a common year starting on Friday of the Gregorian calendar and a common year starting on Tuesday of the Julian calendar, the 1773rd year of the Common Era (CE) and Anno Domini (AD) designations, the 773rd year of the 2nd millennium, the 73rd year of the 18th century, and the 4th year of the 1770s decade. As of the start of 1773, the Gregorian calendar was 11 days ahead of the Julian calendar, which remained in localized use until 1923.

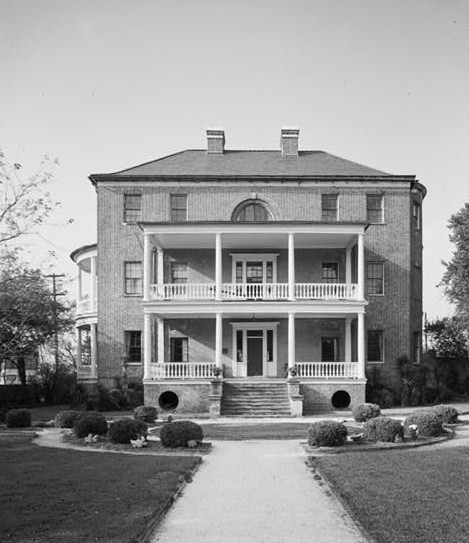
January 12: Charleston Museum, the first museum in the American colonies is established

== Events ==
=== January–March ===
- January 1 – The hymn that becomes known as Amazing Grace, at this time titled "1 Chronicles 17:16–17", is first used to accompany a sermon led by curate John Newton in the town of Olney, Buckinghamshire, England.
- January 12 – The first museum in the American colonies is established in Charleston, South Carolina; in 1915, it is formally incorporated as the Charleston Museum.
- January 17 – Second voyage of James Cook: Captain Cook in HMS Resolution (1771) becomes the first European explorer to cross the Antarctic Circle.
- January 18 – The first opera performance in the Swedish language, Thetis and Phelée, performed by Carl Stenborg and Elisabeth Olin in Bollhuset in Stockholm, Sweden, marks the establishment of the Royal Swedish Opera.
- February 8 – The Grand Council of Poland meets in Warsaw, summoned by a circular letter from King Stanisław August Poniatowski to respond to the Kingdom's threatened partition between three foreign powers.
- February 27 – The construction of Christ Church (Alexandria, Virginia), known for being the house of worship for George Washington and the visiting site for subsequent U.S. presidents, is completed.
- March 9–19 – Second voyage of James Cook: Tobias Furneaux in HMS Adventure (1771) explores the coast of Van Diemen's Land.
- March 15 – The popular (and enduring) comedy She Stoops to Conquer, by Irish playwright Oliver Goldsmith, is performed for the first time, premiering at London's Covent Garden Theatre.

=== April–June ===
- April 27 – The Parliament of Great Britain passes the Tea Act (coming into force on May 10), designed to save the British East India Company by granting it a monopoly on the North American tea trade.
- May 8 – In Egypt, Ottoman rebels revolt, killing Ali Bey, Mamluk Sultan of Egypt.
- June 4 – 1773 Phipps expedition towards the North Pole sets out from Britain.
- June 10 – The Regulating Act is given royal assent by King George III, creating the office of Governor General, with an advising council, to exercise political authority over the territory under British East India Company rule in India.

=== July–September ===
- July 14 – The first annual conference of American Methodists is convened at Philadelphia in St. George's Church.
- July 21 – Under pressure from the Bourbon courts, Pope Clement XIV suppresses the Society of Jesus (brief Dominus ac Redemptor). Joseph II, Holy Roman Emperor, expels the order from his territories.
- July 29 (Feast of St Martha) – Guatemala earthquake: The Santa Marta earthquake hits, with an estimated epicentral magnitude of 7.5 M_{i}, striking Guatemala; numerous aftershocks last until December. The city of Antigua Guatemala is virtually destroyed, leading to the decision to move the country's capital to La Nueva Guatemala de la Asunción.
- August 11 – Second voyage of James Cook in the Tuamotus: Captain Cook discovers Tekokota, which he names Doubtful Island.
- August 12 – Second voyage of James Cook in the Tuamotus: Captain Cook discovers Marutea Nord, which he names Furneaux Island.
- September 11 – The Public Advertiser publishes a satirical essay titled Rules By Which A Great Empire May Be Reduced To A Small One, written by Benjamin Franklin.

=== October–December ===
- October 10
  - Daniel Boone leads the first attempt by British colonists to establish a settlement in Kentucky, but is turned back in an attack by Native Americans, in which his son is killed.
  - Russo-Turkish War (1768–1774): Second of the Russian occupations of Beirut begins, following a naval bombardment which began on August 2. The Russians leave Albanian mercenaries as an occupying force.
  - Paul Revere marries Rachel Walker, his second wife.
- October 12 – America's first insane asylum opens for Persons of Insane and Disordered Minds in Williamsburg, Virginia.
- October 13 – French astronomer Charles Messier discovers the Whirlpool Galaxy, an interacting, grand design spiral galaxy located at a distance of approximately 31 million light-years, in the constellation Canes Venatici.
- October 14 – The Komisja Edukacji Narodowej (Polish for National Education Committee), formed in the Polish–Lithuanian Commonwealth, is considered to be the world's first ministry of education.
- November 10 – Four ships – the Dartmouth, the Eleanor, the Beaver and the William – depart Britain for America, carrying the first Indian tea to be subject to the newly enacted taxes. The William is lost in a storm; the Dartmouth is the first ship to reach Boston, docking on November 28.
- December 16 – Boston Tea Party: A group of American colonists, dressed as Mohawk Indians, steal aboard ships of the East India Company and dump their cargo of tea into Boston Harbor, in protest against British tax policies.
- December 23 – Moscow State Academy of Choreography was founded under the reign of Catherine II. It is the second ballet school in Russia after Vaganova Academy of Russian Ballet.

=== Date unknown ===
- Russo-Turkish War (1768–1774): Russian forces fail to take Silistria.
- Emelian Pugachev starts Pugachev's Rebellion in Russia, attacking and occupying Samara.
- John Harrison wins the Longitude prize, for his invention of the marine chronometer.
- Hilaire Rouelle discovers urea.
- Istanbul Technical University is established (under the name of Royal School of Naval Engineering) as the world's first comprehensive institution of higher learning dedicated to engineering education.
- Marsala wine first shipped to England.
- In China, written work begins on the Complete Library of the Four Treasuries, the largest literary compilation of books in China's history (surpassing the Yongle Encyclopedia of the 15th Century). Upon completion in 1782, the books are bound in 36,381 volumes (册) with more than 79,000 chapters (卷), comprising about 2.3 million pages, and approximately 800 million Chinese characters.
- Scottish judge James Burnett, Lord Monboddo, begins publication of Of the Origin and Progress of Language, a contribution to evolutionary ideas of the Enlightenment.
- Friedrich Gottlieb Klopstock publishes the last five cantos of his epic poem Der Messias in Hamburg.

== Births ==
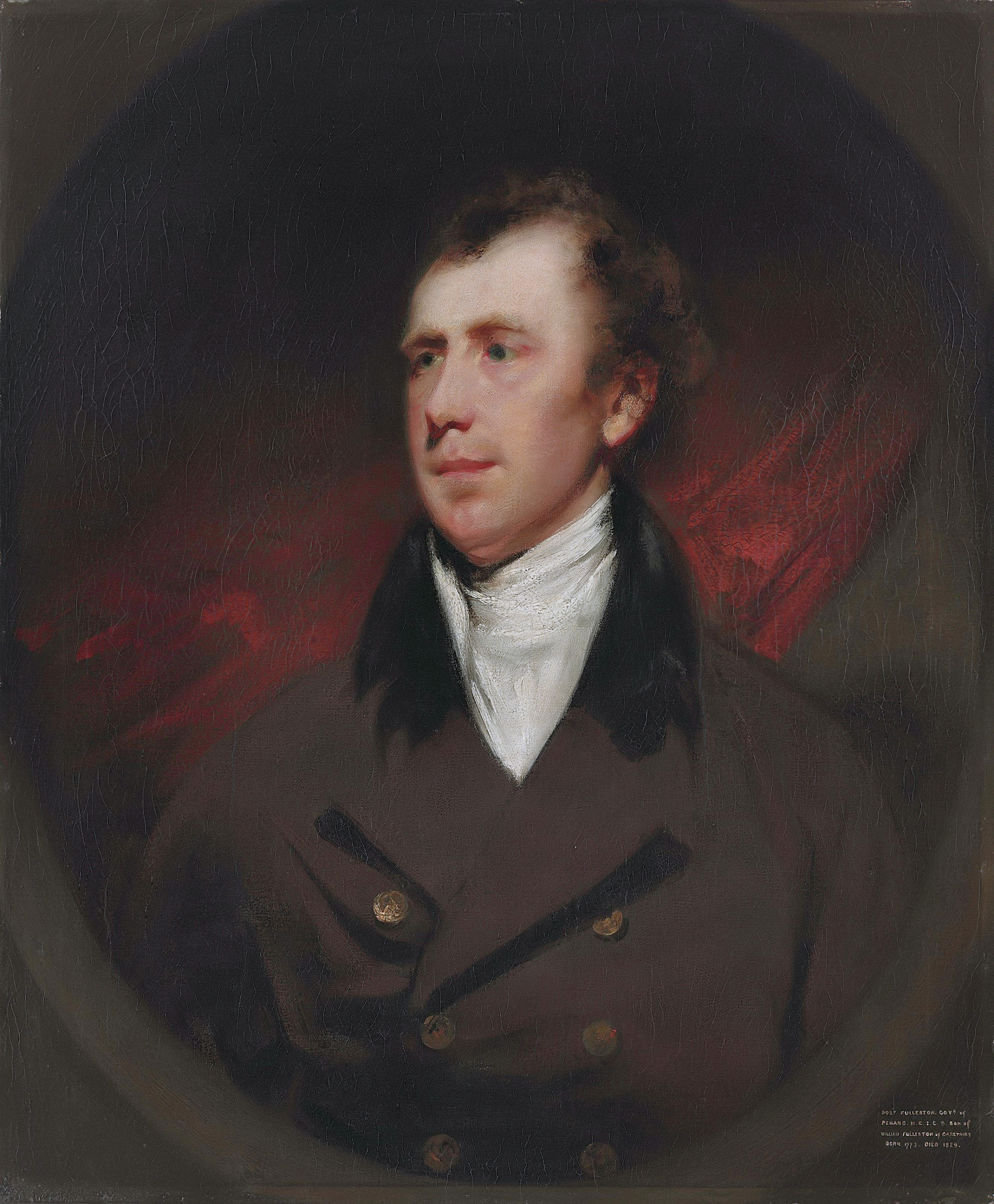
Robert Fullerton

- January 14 – William Amherst, 1st Earl Amherst, British ambassador to China, Governor-General of India (d. 1857)
- January 16 – Robert Fullerton, governor of Penang, first governor of British Straits Settlements (d. 1831)
- January 27 – Prince Augustus of Great Britain, Duke of Sussex (d. 1843)
- January 29 – Friedrich Mohs, German geologist, mineralogist (d. 1839)

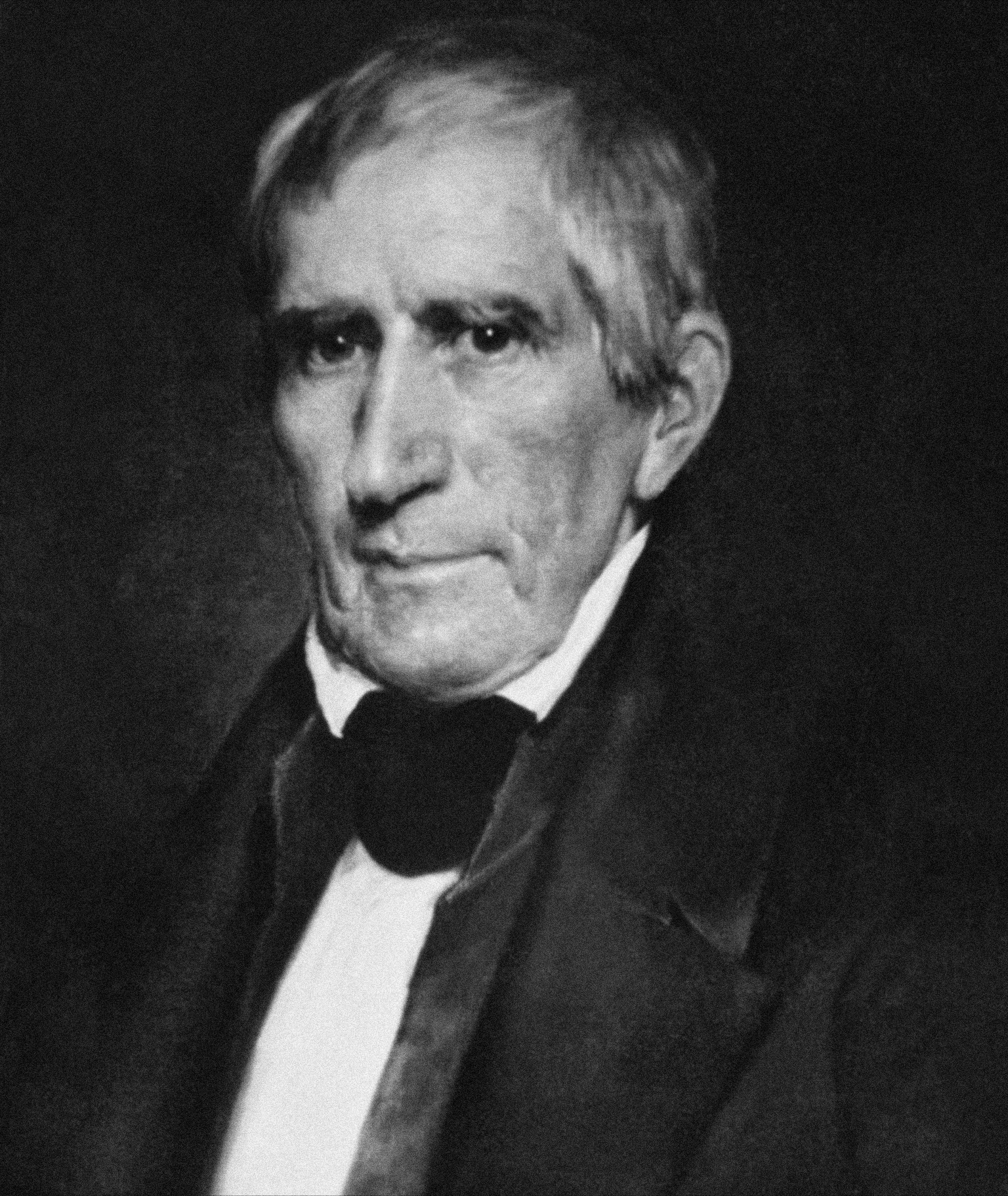
William Henry Harrison

- February 9 – William Henry Harrison, American military leader and ninth President of the United States (d. 1841)
- March 14 – John Holmes, American politician (d. 1843)
- March 16 – Juan Ramón Balcarce, Argentine military leader and politician (d. 1836)
- March 26 – Nathaniel Bowditch, American mathematician (d. 1838)
- April 4 – Étienne Maurice Gérard, Prime Minister and Marshal of France (d. 1852)
- April 9
  - Étienne Aignan, French writer, librettist, and playwright (d. 1824)
  - Marie Boivin, French midwife, inventor and obstetrics writer (d. 1841)
- April 14 – Jean-Baptiste de Villèle, Prime Minister of France (d. 1854)
- May 2 – Henrik Steffens, Norwegian philosopher (d. 1845)
- May 3 – Giuseppe Acerbi, Italian explorer (d. 1846)

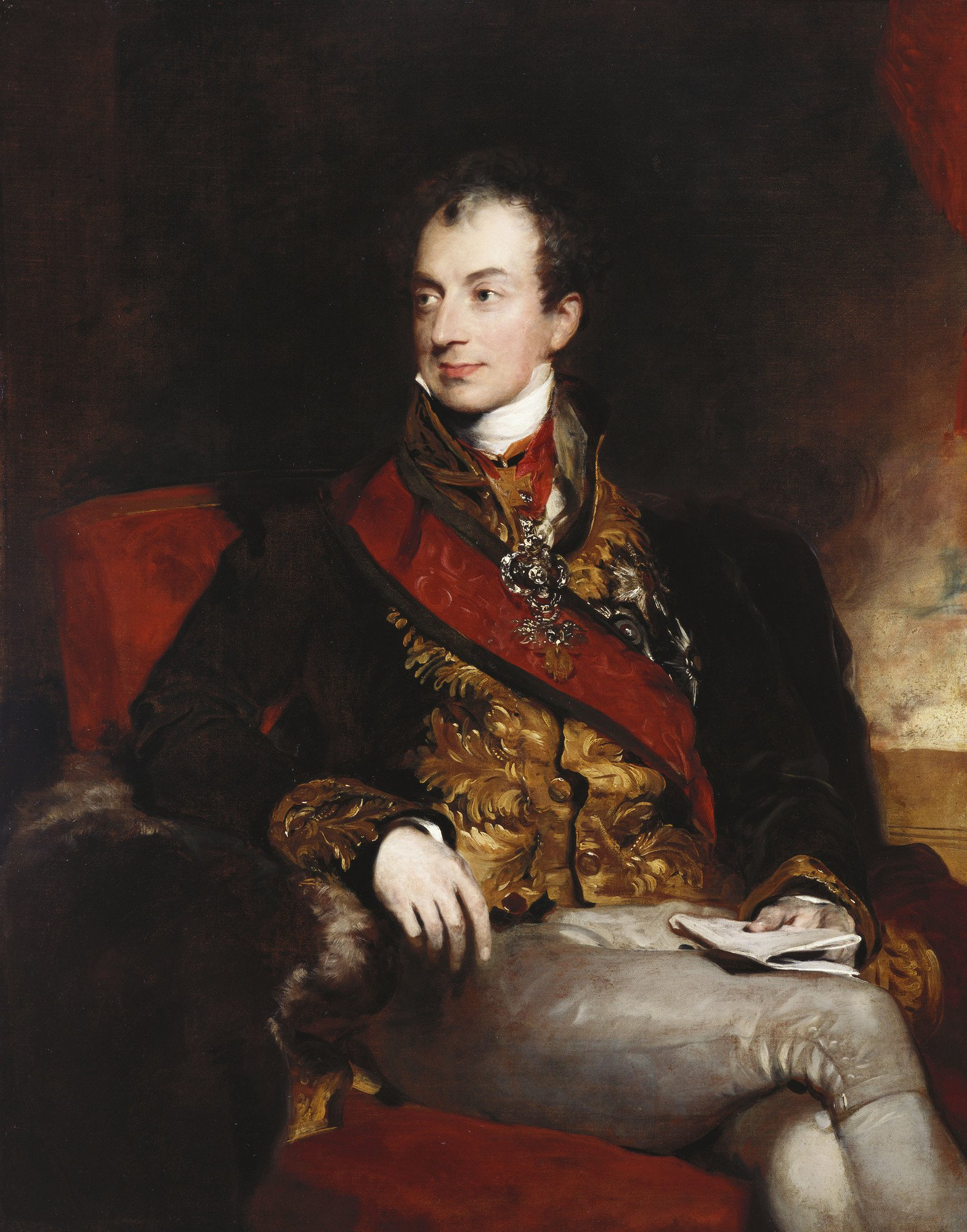
Klemens von Metternich

- May 15 – Prince Klemens Wenzel von Metternich, Austrian statesman (d. 1859)
- May 19 – Arthur Aikin, English chemist and mineralogist (d. 1854)
- May 31 – Ludwig Tieck, German writer (d. 1853)
- June 13 – Thomas Young, English scientist (d. 1829)
- July 23 – Thomas Brisbane, Scottish astronomer, Governor of New South Wales (d. 1860)
- August 12 – Karl Faber, German historian (d. 1853)
- August 22 – Aimé Bonpland, French explorer, botanist (d. 1858)
- September 17 – Jonathan Alder, American settler (d. 1849)

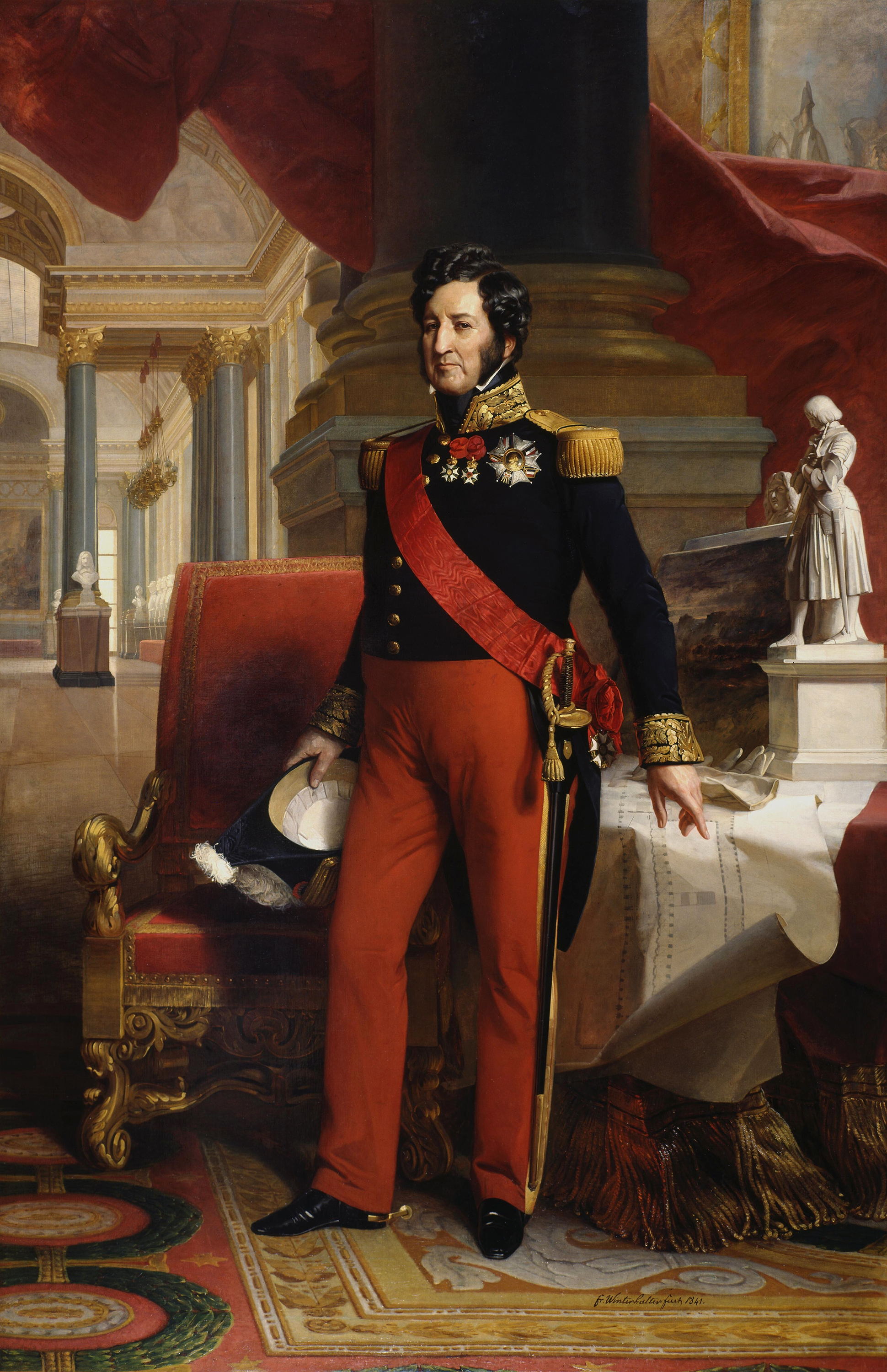
Louis Philippe I

- October 4 – Harriet Auber, English poet, hymnist (d. 1862)
- October 6 – Louis Philippe I, King of the French (d. 1850)
- November 6 – Henry Hunt, British politician (d. 1835)
- November 24 – Shadrach Bond, American politician and the first governor of Illinois (d. 1832)
- December 9 – Armand Augustin Louis de Caulaincourt, French general, diplomat (d. 1827)
- December 17 – Sylvain Charles Valée, Marshal of France (d. 1846)
- December 21 – Robert Brown, Scottish botanist (d. 1858)
- December 27 – Sir George Cayley, English aviation pioneer (d. 1857)
- Unknown – Johann Gottfried Arnold, German cellist (d. 1806)
- Unknown – Kyra Frosini, Greek heroine (d. 1800)
- Unknown – Isabel Zendal, Spanish nurse
- Unknown – Anna Moór, Hungarian actress (d. 1841)

== Deaths ==
- January 1 – Sir Richard Glyn, 1st Baronet, of Ewell, Lord Mayor of London (b. 1711)
- January 12 – Jacob von Eggers, Military engineer (b. 1704)
- January 21 – Alexis Piron, French writer (b. 1689)
- January 23
  - Manuel Pinto da Fonseca, 68th Grandmaster of the Knights Hospitaller (b. 1681)
  - Pieter van Reede van Oudtshoorn, Dutch administrator of the Cape Colony (b. 1714)
- February 20 – King Charles Emmanuel III of Sardinia (b. 1701)
- March 1 – Luigi Vanvitelli, Italian architect (b. 1700)

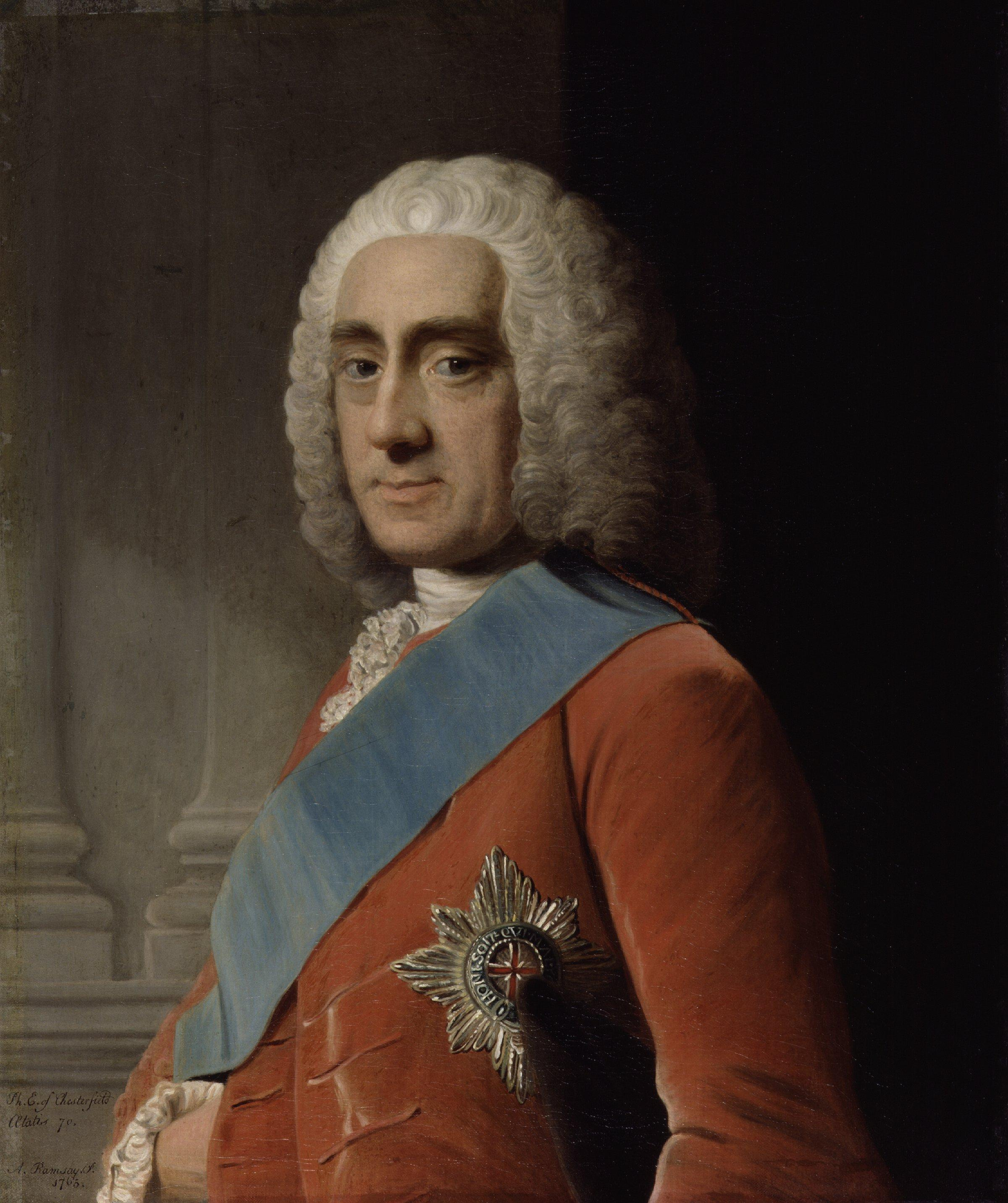
Philip Stanhope, 4th Earl of Chesterfield

- March 24
  - Stephen Leake, English numismatist, officer of arms at the College of Arms in London (b. 1702)
  - Philip Stanhope, 4th Earl of Chesterfield, English statesman and man of letters (b. 1694)
- March 20 – Gottlieb Heinrich Totleben, German noble (b. 1715)
- May 8 – Ali Bey Al-Kabir, Mamluk Sultan of Egypt (b. 1728)
- May 15 – Alban Butler, English Catholic priest, writer (b. 1710)
- May 28 – John Wayles, American lawyer and planter (b. 1715)
- June 21 – Jorge Juan y Santacilia, Spanish geodesist (b. 1713)
- June 27 – Mentewab, dowager Empress of Ethiopia (b. c. 1706)
- July 5 – Francisco José Freire, Portuguese historian, philologist (b. 1719)
- July 12 – Johann Joachim Quantz, German flutist, composer (b. 1697)
- July 23 – George Edwards, English ornithologist and naturalist (b. 1694)
- July 25 – Axel Löwen, Swedish duke (b. 1686)
- August 3 – Stanisław Konarski, Polish writer (b. 1700)
- August 19
  - Burkat Shudi, English harpsichord maker (b. 1702)
  - Francesco Zahra, Maltese painter (b. 1710)
- August 20 – Enrique Florez, Spanish historian (b. 1701)
- September 23 – Johan Ernst Gunnerus, Norwegian bishop and botanist (b. 1718)
- October 14 – Septimanie d'Egmont, French salonist (b. 1740)
- October 30 – Philippe de La Guêpière, French architect (b. 1725)
- November 2 – John Glas, Scottish minister (b. 1695)
- November 7 – Princess Anne Charlotte of Lorraine, French royal (b. 1714)

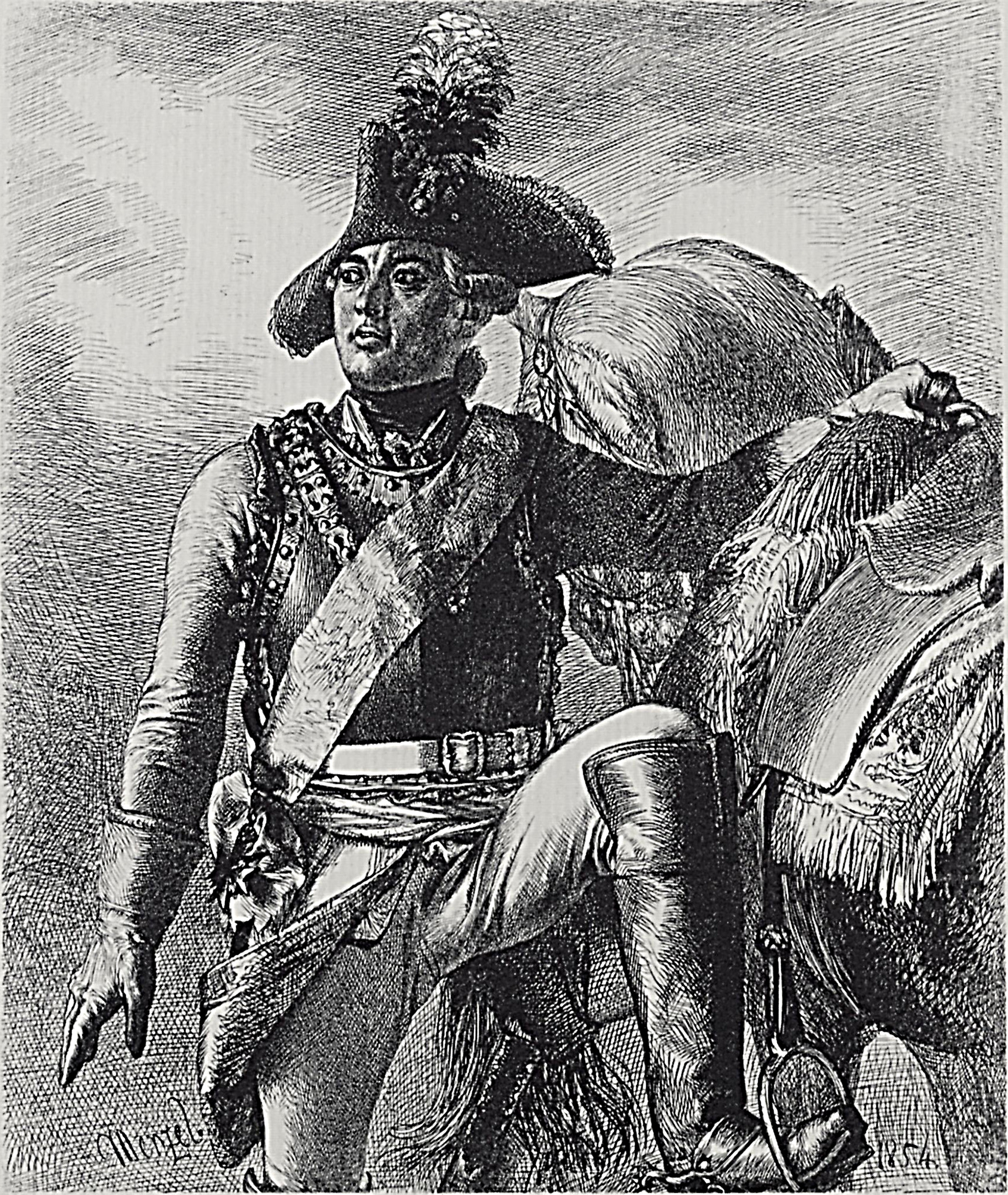
Friedrich Wilhelm von Seydlitz

- November 8 – Friedrich Wilhelm von Seydlitz, Prussian general (b. 1721)
- November 16 – John Hawkesworth, English writer (b. c. 1715)
- November 19 – James FitzGerald, 1st Duke of Leinster, Irish politician (b. 1722)

=== Full date unknown ===
- Bjarni Halldórsson, Icelandic legal figure and theologian (b. c. 1703)
