= Anti-Sacrilege Act =

French law against sacrilege

French Parliament
- Long title: Law for the suppression of crimes and offenses committed in buildings or against objects dedicated to the Catholic religion or to other faiths legally established in France
- Territorial extent: France
- Passed by: Chamber of Peers
- Passed: 18 February 1825
- Passed by: Chamber of Deputies
- Passed: 15 April 1825
- Assented to by: Charles X of France
- Royal assent: 20 April 1825
- Repealed: 11 October 1830

Legislative history

Initiating chamber: Chamber of Peers
- Bill title: Bill regarding the punishment of sacrilege
- Rapporteur: Pierre-Denis, Comte de Peyronnet
- Introduced: 4 January 1825
- Passed: 18 February 1825
- Voting summary: 127 voted for; 92 voted against

Revising chamber: Chamber of Deputies
- Rapporteur: Marie-Bénigne-Ferréol-Xavier de Chifflet d'Orchamps
- Passed: 15 April 1825
- Voting summary: 210 voted for; 95 voted against

Repealed by
- Law abolishing the law regarding sacrilege and theft in churches

Keywords
- Catholic Church in France; French criminal law

Text of statute as originally enacted
- Status: Repealed

The Anti-Sacrilege Act (1825–1830) was a French law against blasphemy and sacrilege passed in April 1825 under King Charles X. The death penalty provision of the law was never applied, but a man named François Bourquin was sentenced to perpetual forced labour for the sacrilegious burglary of Eucharistic objects; the law was later revoked at the beginning of the July Monarchy under King Louis Philippe I.

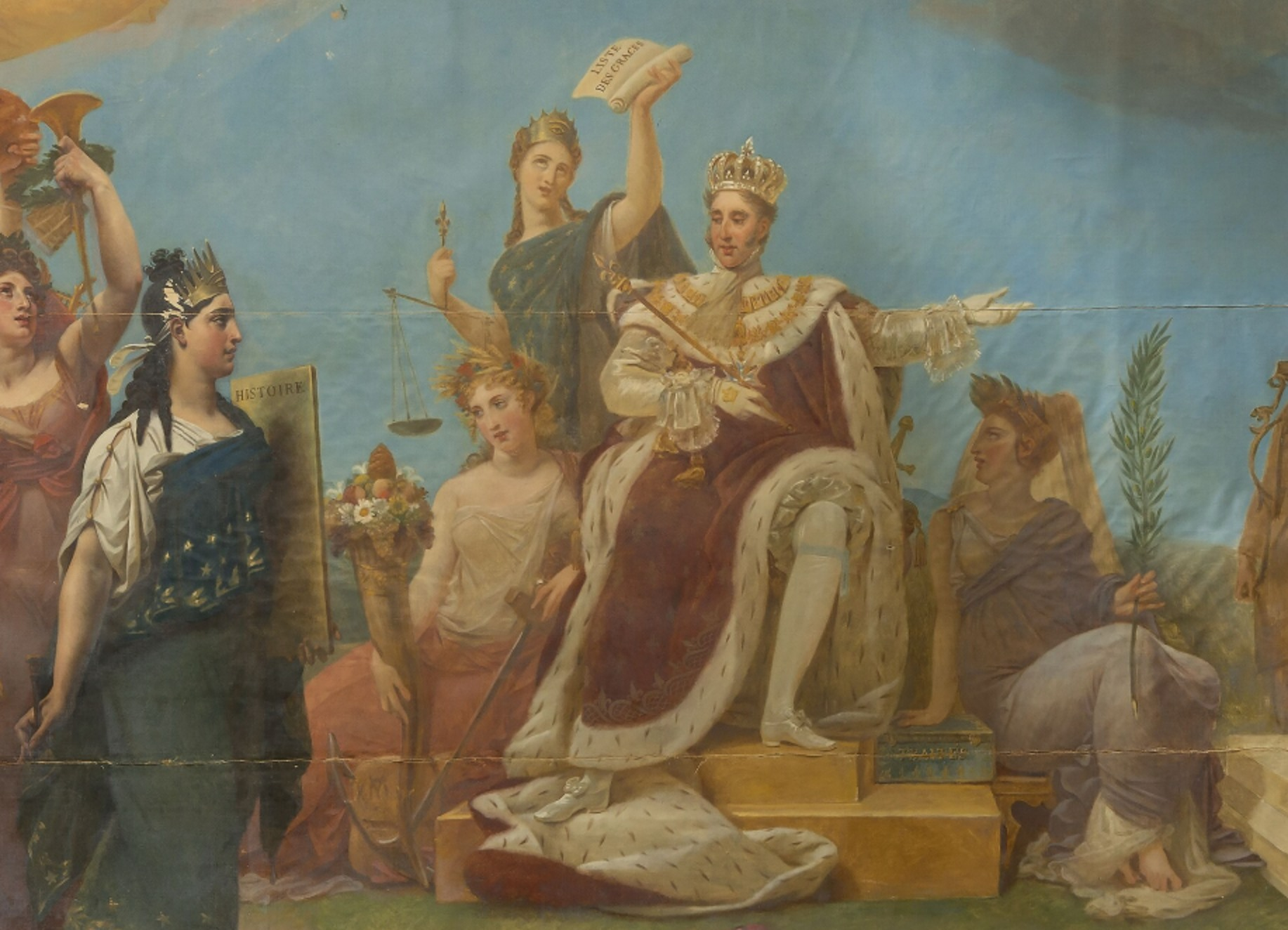
Charles X

== The draft bill ==
In April 1824, King Louis XVIII's government, headed by the Ultra-royalist Jean-Baptiste, Comte de Villèle, introduced a first draft of the law into Parliament. The elections of December 1823, conducted under restricted census suffrage, had produced a heavy ultraroyalist majority in the Chamber of Deputies, which was therefore dubbed Chambre retrouvée (in reference to the ultra-royalist Chambre introuvable elected after the Restoration). Despite this majority, the bill failed as it was not accepted by the Chamber of Peers.

After the accession of Charles X in September of the same year, Villèle's government decided to seize the opportunity and reintroduced the bill, giving an increase in the stealing of sacred vessels (chalices and ciboria) as the reason.

The Villèle government initially envisaged graduating sentences. Concerning profanations, the sentences were to change according to various cases. If the profanation had been done on vessels containing holy objects, the crime was supposed to be punished by perpetual forced labour. If the profanation had been done on vessels containing consecrated hosts, the punishment was death. If it was on the hosts themselves, the death sentence was the same as that given to parricides: cutting off the right hand followed by decapitation (a sentence in force during the Ancien Régime and repealed during the Revolution, but reestablished in 1810). Following the debates, this last punishment was later replaced by an "honorable amend" made by the criminal before dying.

== The government's argument ==
The Comte de Peyronnet, the minister in charge of the law project, described the law as a "necessary expiation after so many years of indifference or impiety". He was followed by the Comte de Breteuil, who declared: "In order to make our laws respected, let us first make religion be respected." The counterrevolutionary essayist Louis, Vicomte de Bonald adamantly defended capital punishment before the Assembly.

== The opponents' arguments ==
Some members of the liberal opposition formed by the Doctrinaires, including the Baron de Barante, the Comte de Languinais, Pierre Paul Royer-Collard and Benjamin Constant, argued that the law created an interpenetration between human justice and God's judgment, and that the state was supposed do no more than protect freedom of religion. Royer-Collard argued, "Just like religion which is not of this world, human law is not of the invisible world; both worlds, which touch each others, should never be confused: the tomb is their limit." He declared the law "anti-constitutional" and as "violating freedom of thought", imposing one specific religion over other ones. Benjamin Constant, a Protestant, argued that his religion itself prohibited him from voting for the law, as the real presence of the Christ in the host could be considered as such only by Catholics. Either the person said to be guilty believes in the dogma and is therefore "insane", argued Constant, or he does not, in which case sacrilege cannot be said to be constituted and he must therefore be punished only as a "heckler" (perturbateur).

Some reactionary politicians argued in the same manner: the Comte de Lanjuinais argued that the word of deicide was in itself a blasphemy, and that the law could not "constitute itself judge of the offenses against God". Thus Justice Minister Peyronnet finally decided to limit the law to sacrileges "voluntarily and publicly" committed, as not to interfere with inner conscience and confession. Peyronnet even made an analogy with "indecent assaults" (attentats à la pudeur): one shocks public morality only by committing such acts in public, not in private. The same goes, argued Peyronnet, in concerns with sacrilege. Peyronnet's argumentation was seen by the press as adventurous and ill-founded. Hugues Felicité Robert de Lamennais attacked Villèle's government in a pamphlet, asking how a sacrilege can be a crime committed against religion but not against God.

== Vote ==
Following long and passionate debates, the project was adopted by the Peers' Chamber by 127 votes against 96, then by the deputies by 210 votes against 95. The text benefited from the support of the thirteen peers who were also prelates, without whom the death penalty would not have been adopted by the Chambre des pairs. The Anti-Sacrilege Act specified that for the sacrilege to be constituted, the act must take place "voluntarily, publicly and by hatred or contempt for religion".

== Impact and evaluation ==
The death penalty provision of the law was never applied, but a man named François Bourquin, who was a weaver from Mossans, was sentenced to perpetual forced labour for the sacrilegious burglary of Eucharistic objects from three separate churches; the law was repealed after the 1830 July Revolution, in the first months of King Louis-Philippe's reign.

Historian Jean-Noël Jeanneney, former president of the Bibliothèque nationale de France (2002–2007), deemed the law "anachronistic" and highlighted the Ultra-Royalists' position of Enlightenment ideas by referring to the idea of non-intervention of the state in religious matters presented by the "Sacrilege" article in Diderot's and d'Alembert's Encyclopédie.

== See also ==
- Bourbon Restoration
- Dechristianization of France during the French Revolution
- France in the nineteenth century
- French criminal law
- Roman Catholicism in France

== Bibliography ==
- M. Duvergier de Hauranne, Histoire du gouvernement parlementaire en France, 1814-1848, t. VIII, 1867, chap. 34. (analysis of the debates by an Orleanist historian)
- H. Hasquin, "La loi du sacrilège dans la France de la Restauration (1825)", in Problèmes d'histoire des religions, Editions de l'université de Bruxelles, t. XIII, 2003, pp. 127–142.
- Jean-Noël Jeanneney, "Quand le sacrilège était puni de mort en France", in L'Histoire, June 2006, pp. 68–72.
- J.-H. Lespagnol, La Loi du Sacrilège, Domat-Montchrestien, 1935.
- L.F. du Loiret (Le Four), Histoire abrégée du sacrilège chez les différents peuples et particulièrement en France, t. II, self-published, 1825.
