= Ástríður Bjarnadóttir =

18th-century Icelandic noblewoman

- Born: 1729
- Disappeared: 1802
- Spouse: Halldór Jakobsson
- Children: Guðrún Halldórsdóttir
- Parent(s): Bjarni Halldórsson, Hólmfriður Vídalínsdóttir
- Relatives: Þorbjörg Bjarnadóttir (sister), Reynistaður Brothers (nephews)

Ástríður Bjarnadóttir (1729–1802) was the wife of an Icelandic sýslumaður, Halldór Jakobsson, whom she did not want to marry.

== Family ==
Her father was Bjarni Halldórsson of Þingeyrar who was the sýslumaður in Húnavatnssýsla county, and her mother was Hólmfriður (died 1736), the daughter of Páll Vídalín. Ástríður was their older daughter; her sister was named Þorbjörg and they had three brothers, Páll, Jón, and Halldór Vídalín, which made the Reynistaður Brothers Ástríður's nephews.

== Marriage ==
Ástríður was engaged to Erlendur who was a student and had been one of her father's boys. Ástríður and Erlendur had one child together (out of wedlock) who died young. Bjarni was incensed and he reportedly punished her physically. A little later, Ástríður and Erlendur fled to Hólar where Bishop Gísli Magnússon wrote Bjarni a letter recommending that he give his permission for Ástríður and Erlendur to marry, but her father did not allow it and instead demanded that she return home.

In 1760, she was unwillingly married to Halldór Jakobsson who was the sýslumaður of Strandasýsla county. Their wedding took place in Þingeyrar and they lived in Fell in Kollafjörður. The couple had one daughter, Guðrún, and she married Einar Thorlacius of Grenjaðarstaður, but she died in 1783.

Ástríður was considered avaricious and stingy, other than towards Erlendur, who had married Karítas Sigurðardóttir. When the outlaw-thief Halldór Ásgrímsson was arrested, she did not want him to be fed if he did not work for his food, but then he ran away. Fjalla-Eyvindur, who was caught in 1763—along with Halla Jónsdóttir and Abraham—also ran away from Fell, and Ástríður allegedly helped them. When Halldór Jakobsson invited Magnús Ketilsson to his home in Fell, she offended him and his spouse with an inferior spread.

In 1787, the merchant vessel Fortúna (Fortune) ran aground off the coast of Eyvindarfjörður. It is said:

That when the sýslumaður Halldór left home to repair the stranded Fortúna, Ástríður asked him to be careful, which she did not typically do, she said that she expected that the trip would be his undoing and it turned out that her prediction came true.

The so-called "Fortune situation" led to the sýslumaður Halldór being dismissed from his position.

Ástríður's relationship with Halldór was difficult and, in 1796, after more than 30 years of marriage, she left him. She moved to Reynistaður where Halldór's brother lived. In 1800, he died and Ástríður moved to Víðidalstunga where her sister Þorbjörg, by then a widow, lived. Ástríður died there in 1802.
