= Anna Moór =

Hungarian actress

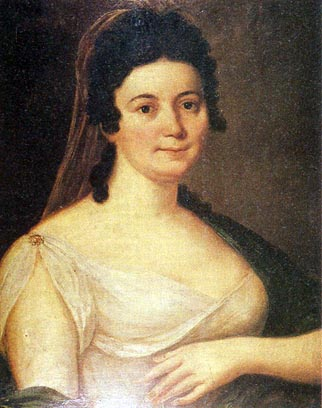
Anna Moór

Anna Moór (1773–1841) was a Hungarian stage actress. She belonged to the first professional actresses in Hungary, the star actress of the first Hungarian language theater company.

Anna Moór performed in the inauguration performance of the first Hungarian language theater company in the Court Theatre of Buda on 25 October 1790. The first Hungarian theater company in Hungary was formed by Kelemen László and composed of the first pioneer generation of Hungarian stage actors, such as Sehy Ferenc Lángné Elizabeth Clement Kontz József Láng Ádám János, and Anna Moór is referred to as the female star of the theater. She was appreciated within both comic roles and as heroine. Among her roles was the title role in Etelka by Dugonics András.
