= Þingeyrakirkja =

19th-century stone church in Iceland

Coordinates: 65.5545°N 20.4043°W

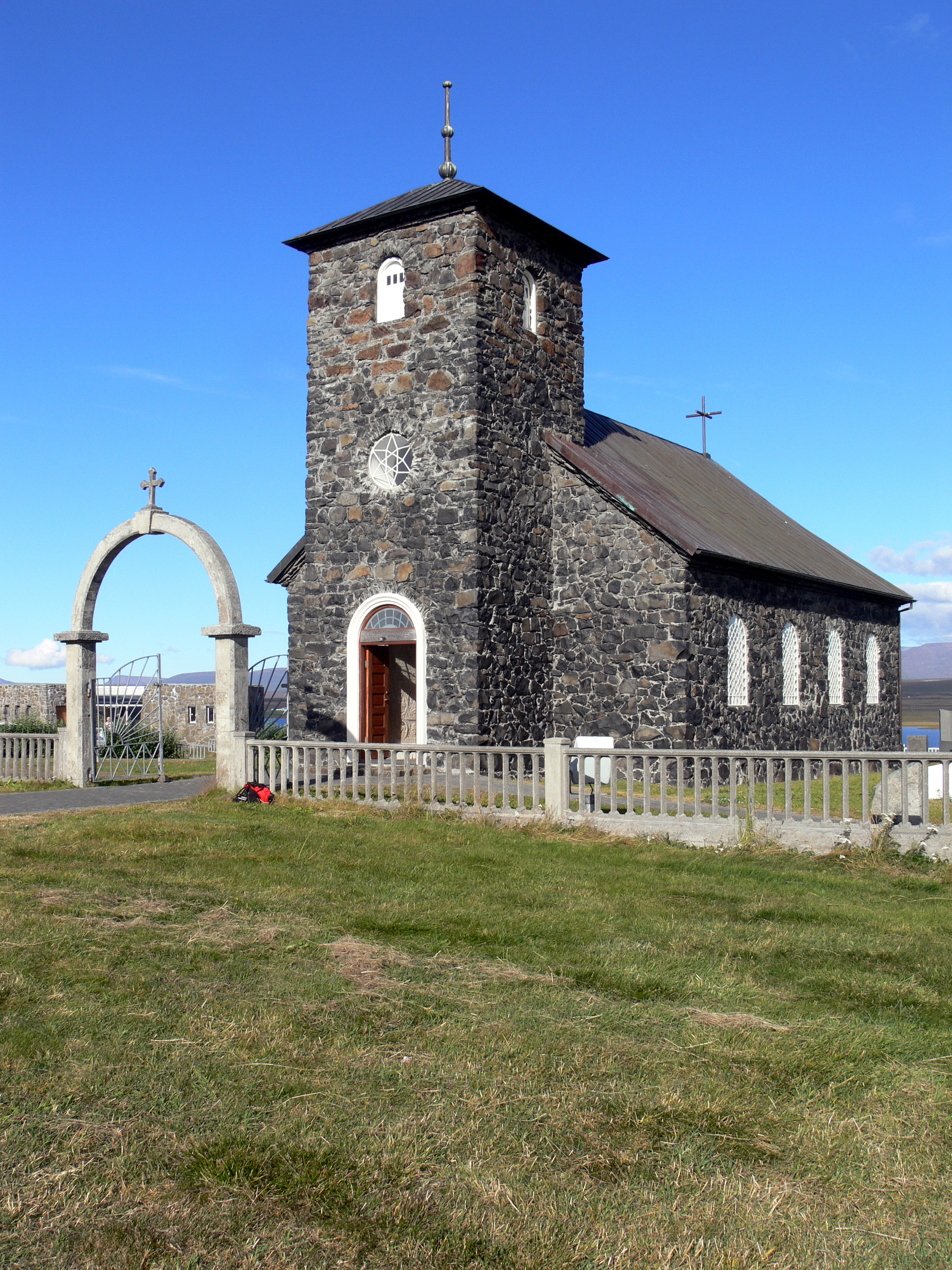
Church in Þingeyrar (Þingeyrakirkja)

Þingeyrakirkja is an Icelandic church situated between lakes Hóp and Húnavatn at Þingeyrar in Iceland's Northwestern Region.

It was consecrated on 9 September 1877 by the Reverend Eiríkur Briem from Steinnes. Þingeyrakirkja is a stone church which replaced an old turf church, the objects from which were moved to Þingeyrakirkja. Among the valuable items are an alabastar altarpiece most likely dating from the 13th century, and a pulpit estimated to be of Dutch origin from 1696. The pulpit was a gift from Lárus Gottrúp, a lawyer who resided at Þingeyrar Monastery (Þingeyraklaustur) from 1683 to 1721. He also gave a silver baptismal font inscribed with the dates 1663 and 1697. A silver chalice and an altar linen from 1763 are also among the church's historically valuable possessions.

Ásgeir Einarsson (1809–1885) was largely responsible for the church's construction. Einarsson was a local farmer and a member of the Icelandic Parliament ( Alþingi). Construction of the church took 13 years and required transporting stone from Nesbjörg throughout the winter of 1864–65, by sled over the ice-covered lake Hóp on an 8-km journey. Stonemason Sverrir Runólfsson assisted with the planning and built the church walls. Each stone used was put in stowage or tied down and also glued with chalk, and the stones have not moved to this day.
