= Polignac Memorandum =

British document written in 1823

The Polignac Memorandum was a document by George Canning (British Foreign Secretary) written in October 1823, stating that Great Britain had no intention of aiding Spain in the retention of its colonies in Latin and South America. The document was a result of talks with Prince Jules de Polignac, the French Ambassador to Great Britain. Both countries (France and Great Britain) agreed that there was no hope of Spain recovering its colonies in the Americas, that neither nation had any desire to gain territory in the region, or gain exclusive commercial treaties. Canning was then able to advise King George IV to extend diplomatic recognition to Buenos Aires, Colombia, and Mexico, and authorize British ministers in South America to negotiate with their respective states for commercial treaties.

During this time period, the European states had formed the Quintuple Alliance after the 1815 Congress of Vienna to restore balance to Europe after the Napoleonic Wars. Spain was having trouble with its colonies in Latin and South America, and was fighting a losing battle to remain an empire. Villele, the French Prime Minister under Louis XVIII viewed the Polignac Memorandum as a way to refuse to aid Ferdinand VII in his attempts to regain his colonies.
