= Hóp =

Hóp may refer to:

- Hóp (Iceland), an Icelandic lake
- Hóp (Vinland), a Viking name for what was possibly a part of the North American Atlantic coast
