= Þingeyrar =

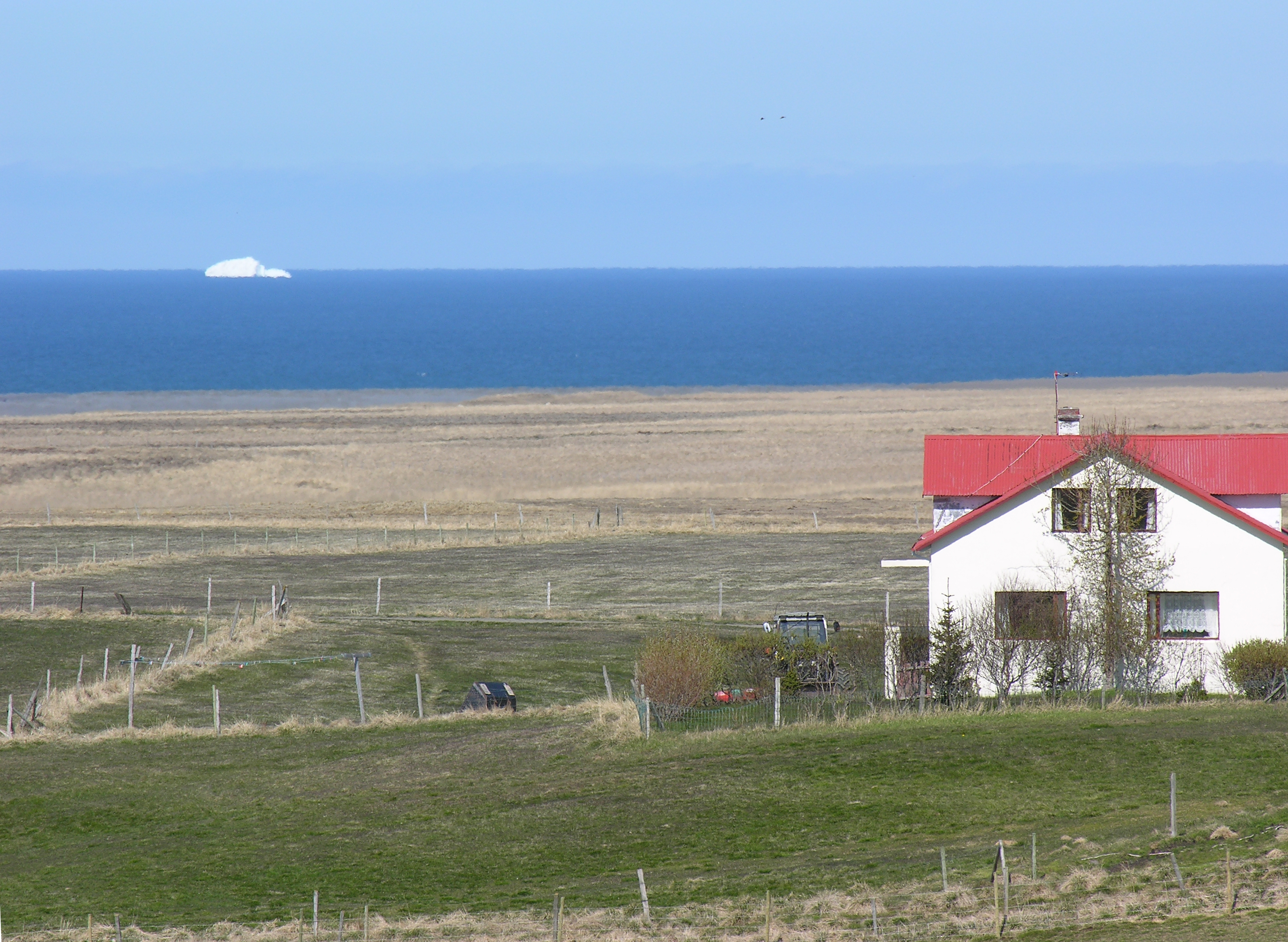
- View from Route 1 towards Þingeyrasandur

- Location within Iceland
- Coordinates: 65.538063°N 20.616341°W
- Country: Iceland
- Region: Norðurland vestra
- Time zone: UTC+0 (WET)
  - Summer (DST): UTC+0 (Not observed)

Þingeyrar (Thingøre in some older texts) is a farm in Iceland's Northwestern Region. It lies adjacent to the sandy coastal plain of Þingeyrasandur (or Thingøresand), between the Skagi and Vatnsnes peninsulas and just northeast of lake Hóp. Þingeyrar was formerly the location of the famous convent Þingeyraklaustur (1133–1551). It is also the site of Iceland's first stone church, Þingeyrakirkja.

Icelandic scholar and politician Björn M. Ólsen (1850–1919) was born in Þingeyrar. Bjarni Halldórsson (c. 1703–1773), an Icelandic legal figure and theologian, spent most of his life in Þingeyrar.

One of the earliest recorded giant squid (Architeuthis dux) specimens was found washed ashore on Þingeyrasandur in 1639.
