= Pierre-Denis, Comte de Peyronnet =

French politician

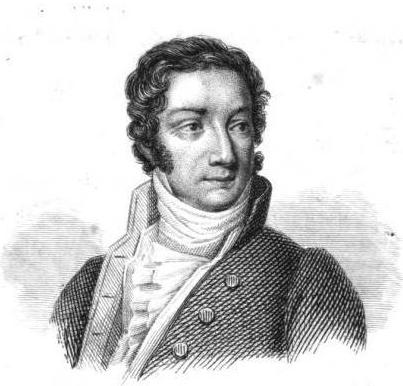
Pierre-Denis, Comte de Peyronnet

Pierre-Denis, comte de Peyronnet (9 October 1778, in Bordeaux – 2 January 1854) was the president of the Bordeaux Court in France in 1815, Minister of Justice from 1821 to 1828 and four times Minister of Interior. Opposed to Napoleon's Empire, he rallied himself to the Bourbons during the Restoration. An Ultra-royalist, he supported the Anti-Sacrilege Act, the 1827 law restricting press freedom, and the loi du droit d'aînesse.

== Life ==
The Count of Peyronnet's father had bought a charge of secretary to the King, thus conferring himself a noble title. He was guillotined during the Terror. After law studies, Pierre-Denis de Peyronnet was received as a lawyer in 1796. On 26 October 1815, he was named president of the first instance Court of Bordeaux, and then, a year later, public prosecutor in Bourges.

The Count of Peyronnet was elected deputy on 13 November 1820, and established himself in Paris. Nominated general prosecutor at the Royal Court of Rouen, he was then called for on 14 December 1821 to become Minister of Justice (and remained so until 1828). From 6 September to 29 October 1822, he was also interim Minister of Interior. There, he defended before the National Assembly the law project restricting press freedom (1822).

Reelected on 6 March 1824 as both deputy of the Cher and of the Gironde, he chose to sit as a Gironde deputy.

He was again interim Interior Minister from 9 July to 2 August 1825, and defended the Anti-Sacrilege Act. He was again Interior Minister from 30 August to 19 September 1826, and defended the press censorship bill (loi de justice et d'amour) of 1827. The King named him pair of France on 4 January 1828, and he left the Ministry the following day.

On 19 May 1830, he became Interior Minister for the fourth time, and remained so until the fall of the regime. He counter-signed the 25 July Ordinances which provoked the 1830 July Revolution. He was then charged of high treason, alongside three other ministers of Charles X, Jules de Polignac, Jean de Chantelauze and Martial de Guernon-Ranville, and was condemned by the Court of Pairs to a life sentence and civil degradation.

Detained in the fort of Ham, he benefitted from a collective pardon issued by the first cabinet of Louis Mathieu Molé on 17 October 1836. He finally died on 2 January 1854 in the Château de Montferrand in Gironde.

== Works ==
- Esquisse Politique (1829)
- Pensées d'un Prisonnier (1834)
- Satires (1854)
- Histoire de France (1855)

== Sources ==
- Archives familiales Peyronnet
- Archives départementales de Bordeaux
- Dictionnaire des Parlementaires, Tome IV (gallica.fr)
