= Sehy Ferenc =

Hungarian stage actor

Sehy Ferenc (1764-1799), was a Hungarian stage actor. He belonged to the pioneer generation of professional actors of his country as a member of the first Hungarian theater company founded by Kelemen László, and played the male main part of several successful productions.
