= Jean de Chantelauze =

French lawyer and politician

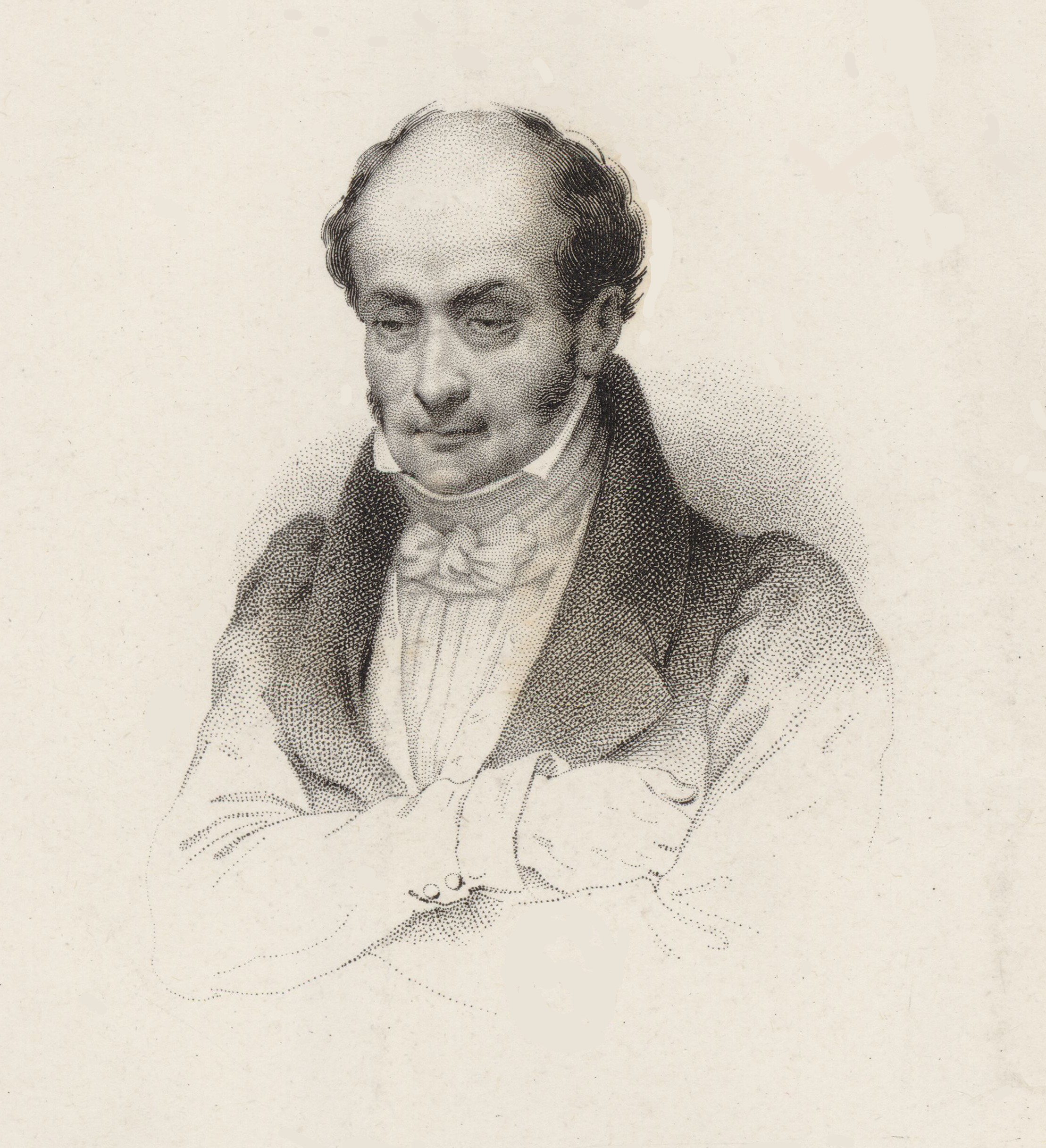
- Born: 10 November 1787; Montbrison, Loire, France
- Died: 10 August 1859 (aged 71); Château de Beauplan, Pierrelatte, Drôme, France
- Occupation: Politician
- Known for: Minister of Justice

Jean Claude Balthazar Victor de Chantelauze (10 November 1787 – 10 August 1859) was a French lawyer and politician who was appointed Minister of Justice in the last weeks of the Bourbon Restoration. He lost his post in the July Revolution of 1830, and spent the next six years in prison.

== Early years ==
Jean Claude Balthazar Victor de Chantelauze was born in Montbrison, Loire, on 10 November 1787. He became known after the first Bourbon Restoration in 1814 by a very liberal brochure on the draft constitution that the conservative senate had to submit to King Louis XVIII. He was then appointed deputy prosecutor in Montbrison. He made a point of resigning during the Hundred Days when Napoleon returned from exile. After the second Restoration this earned him the position of Advocate-General at the court of Lyon on 25 October 1815. He was awarded the cross of the Legion of Honor in 1821. He was appointed Attorney General first at the court of Douai on 21 July 1826, and three months later at the court of Riom.

== Political career ==
On 17 November 1827 Chantelauze was elected as a deputy for the Loire (Montbrison). There were some difficulties about the election and he did not enter the chamber until 11 February 1828. At the opening session of 1830 Chantelauze was supported by the government in a bid to become President of the Chamber, winning 116 votes. In the secret committee of 15 March 1830 he protested against the proposed hostile address to the government. When Jean Joseph Antoine de Courvoisier resigned, King Charles X offered the Ministry of Justice to Chantelauze, who accepted on 19 May 1830 after much hesitation. Chantelauze was reelected on 23 June 1830. He signed the reactionary July Ordinances on 25 July 1830 without speaking for or against them.

== Later years ==
During the July Revolution that erupted on 26–29 July 1830, Chantelauze accompanied the king to Rambouillet, and after the abdication retired to the Tours region. He was arrested and taken to Tours, where he pleaded immunity as a deputy without success. He was jailed, and on 25 August 1830 was taken to the Château de Vincennes. He was tried in front of the Chamber of Peers on 15 December 1830, and on 21 December 1830 was sentenced to life imprisonment, as were Pierre-Denis, Comte de Peyronnet and Martial de Guernon-Ranville.

Chantelauze was imprisoned in the Château de Ham. He was released in 1836 when a collective pardon was granted at the instigation of Molé ministry. After this he lived in deep retirement. He died in the Château de Beauplan, Pierrelatte, Drôme, on 11 August 1859, aged 71.
