= Amende honorable =

Ritual public humiliation in France

Amende honorable was originally a mode of punishment in France which required the offender, barefoot and stripped to his shirt, and led into a church or auditory with a torch in his hand and a rope round his neck held by the public executioner, to beg pardon on his knees of his God, his king, and his country.

By acknowledging their guilt, offenders made it clear, implicitly or explicitly, that they would refrain from future misconduct and would not seek revenge. Often used as a political punishment, and sometimes as an alternative to execution, it would sometimes serve as an acknowledgement of defeat and an instrument to restore peace.

The term is now used to denote a satisfactory apology or reparation.

== History ==
=== Origins ===
Despite its name, the amende honorable is a ritual of public humiliation, which origins can be traced back to the Roman ritual of deditio or receptio in fidem.

From the 9th to the 14th century, a punishment called harmiscara in Latin (Harmschar in German, haschiée in French), consisting in carrying a dog or a saddle, was used to punish members of the nobility who had outraged the monarch or the church. Such a punishment was imposed, for example, in 1155 by Frederick Barbarossa to punish those who had troubled the peace in the Holy Roman Empire.

In a similar fashion, In 1347, the Burghers of Calais presented themselves in shirt and rope around their necks to beg the forgiveness of King Edward III, offended by the city's refusal to submit to him – a ritual that may have biblical origins.

The term amende honorable seems to spread during the 14th and 15th centuries – historian Jean-Marie Moeglin notes that Enguerrand de Monstrelet used it in the context of the reparations requested by the Duchess of Orleans after the assassination of her husband, Duke Louis of Orleans. It appeared in the acts of Parliament at roughly the same time, in an agreement of 1401.

During the 15th century, the amende honorable seems a rather common form of punishment administered by ecclesiastical courts. Studying the forms of punishment pronounced by the judicial vicar of Cambray, Véronique Beaulande-Barraud finds the amende honorable to be among the most common of sentences, rarer than fines in wax but as common as prison terms and excommunications.

However, the amende honorable rarely constitutes the full sanction, but generally a complement to other forms of punishment, such as banishment, pilgrimages, jail or even death sentences. Nicole Gothier notes:

The amende honorable is addressed to those who have suffered the insult or damage, [and] it takes place on the "place of wrongdoing" as specified in the style of the Parliament. But such a ceremony, which puts the convicted person's self-esteem to the test, since it makes no mystery of the indignity of the crime, is rarely sufficient in itself. To punish the misdeed, once the culprit has publicly confessed their darkness and acknowledged their guilt, another penalty feels needed. In the best of cases it is only a banishment, [but] usually a corporal punishment, or even a death sentence. Thus, the amende honorable is close to a confession and penance, made with the prospect of facing the tribunal of God.

=== Amende honorable by John the Fearless (1408) ===
The first widely known example of Amende honorable is the one made by Duke of Burgundy John the Fearless, after the murder of Duke Louis of Orleans in 1408:

In order to make reparation for his crime, the Duke of Burgundy had to make Amende honorable: in the presence of the entire royal court, he had to confess his crime publicly and ask forgiveness from the victims, that is the Duchess of Orleans and her son, while wearing a girdle or a chaperone, kneeling on the ground.

Amable Guillaume Prosper Brugière, baron de Barante thus describes the ordeal:

The Duke of Burgundy was to be brought to the Louvre or to whatever place the king liked.

There, in the presence of the king, or of the Duke of Aquitaine, of all those of royal blood, and of the council, before the people, the said Duke of Burgundy, without hood or belt, kneeling before Madame d'Orléans and her children, accompanied by as many people as they would like, was to say and confess, publicly and loudly, that, maliciously and by ambush, he had murdered the Duke of Orleans out of hatred, envy, covetousness and not for any other cause, notwithstanding the things he had claimed on the subject. For each and every one of his offenses, he repented and asked Madame d'Orléans and her children to forgive him, humbly begging them to forgive him; that he knew of nothing ill against the good and honor of the Duke d'Orléans.

He was then to be taken to the courtyard of the palace and to the Hôtel Saint-Paul where, on the scaffolding erected for this purpose, he would repeat the same words; he would remain there on his knees until the priests present had recited the seven psalms of penance, the litanies, and prayers for the repose of the soul of the Duke d'Orléans. Then, he would kiss the ground and ask for forgiveness. An account of this Amend would be made in the royal letters addressed to all the good cities, in order to be shouted and published to the sound of the trumpets.

=== Grande Rebeyne revolt (1529) ===
After the failed Grande Rebeyne revolt in Lyon, several rebels were sentenced to an Amende honorable in the streets of the city:

Several rebels had to make Amende honorable: it is said that they had to hold a burning torch in their fist, and to put a rope around their necks, escorted by sergeants and criers, who loudly and clearly announced the identity of the accused and his crimes. The undignified appearance comes to reinforce the public statement in two parts: confession and request for forgiveness for one's faults.

=== Amende honorable as part of the execution of Robert-François Damiens (1757) ===
The amende honorable was sometimes incorporated into a larger ritual of capital punishment (specifically the French version of drawing and quartering) for parricides and regicides; this is described in the 1975 book Discipline and Punish by Michel Foucault, notably in reference to Robert-François Damiens who was condemned to make the amende honorable before the main door of the Church of Paris in 1757.

== In the arts ==
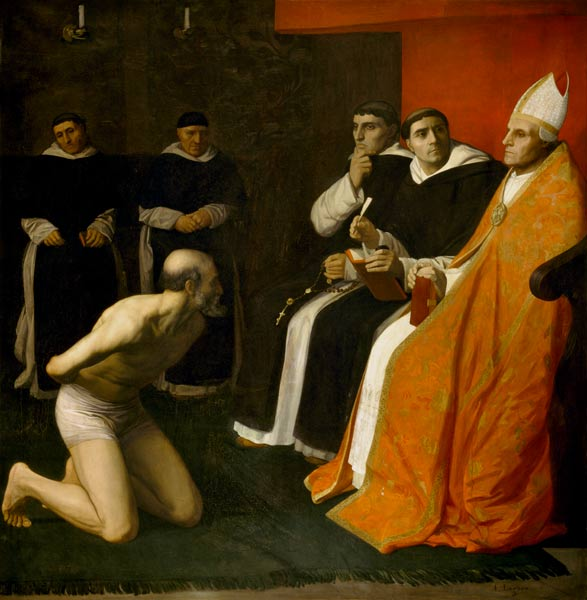
Alphonse Legros, Une amende honorable, Musée d'Orsay

In Victor Hugo's The Hunchback of Notre-Dame, the death sentence imposed on Esmeralda includes an amende honorable:

The clerk then began to write, and presently handed a long scroll of parchment to the President; after which the poor girl heard the people stirring, and an icy voice say: "Bohemian girl, on such a day as it shall please our lord the King to appoint, at the hour of noon, you shall be taken in a tumbrel, in your shift, barefoot, a rope round your neck, before the great door of Notre Dame, there to do penance with a wax candle of two pounds' weight in your hands; and from there you shall be taken to the Place-de-Grève, where you will be hanged and strangled on the town gibbet, and your goat likewise; and shall pay to the Office three lion-pieces of gold in reparation of the crimes, by you committed and confessed, of sorcery, magic, prostitution, and murder against the person of the Sieur Phœbus de Châteaupers. And God have mercy on your soul!"

L'Amende Honorable is the name of an 1831 painting by Eugène Delacroix; it depicts an imaginary scene, taking place in the 16th century in the Palace of Justice in Rouen, in which a monk is dragged before the Bishop of Madrid for rebelling against his orders.

Alphonse Legros also painted an Amende Honorable (around 1868), depicting a religious court at the time of the Inquisition.
