= Jean Baptiste Gay, 1st Viscount of Martignac =

French statesman (1778–1832)

The Viscount of Martignac
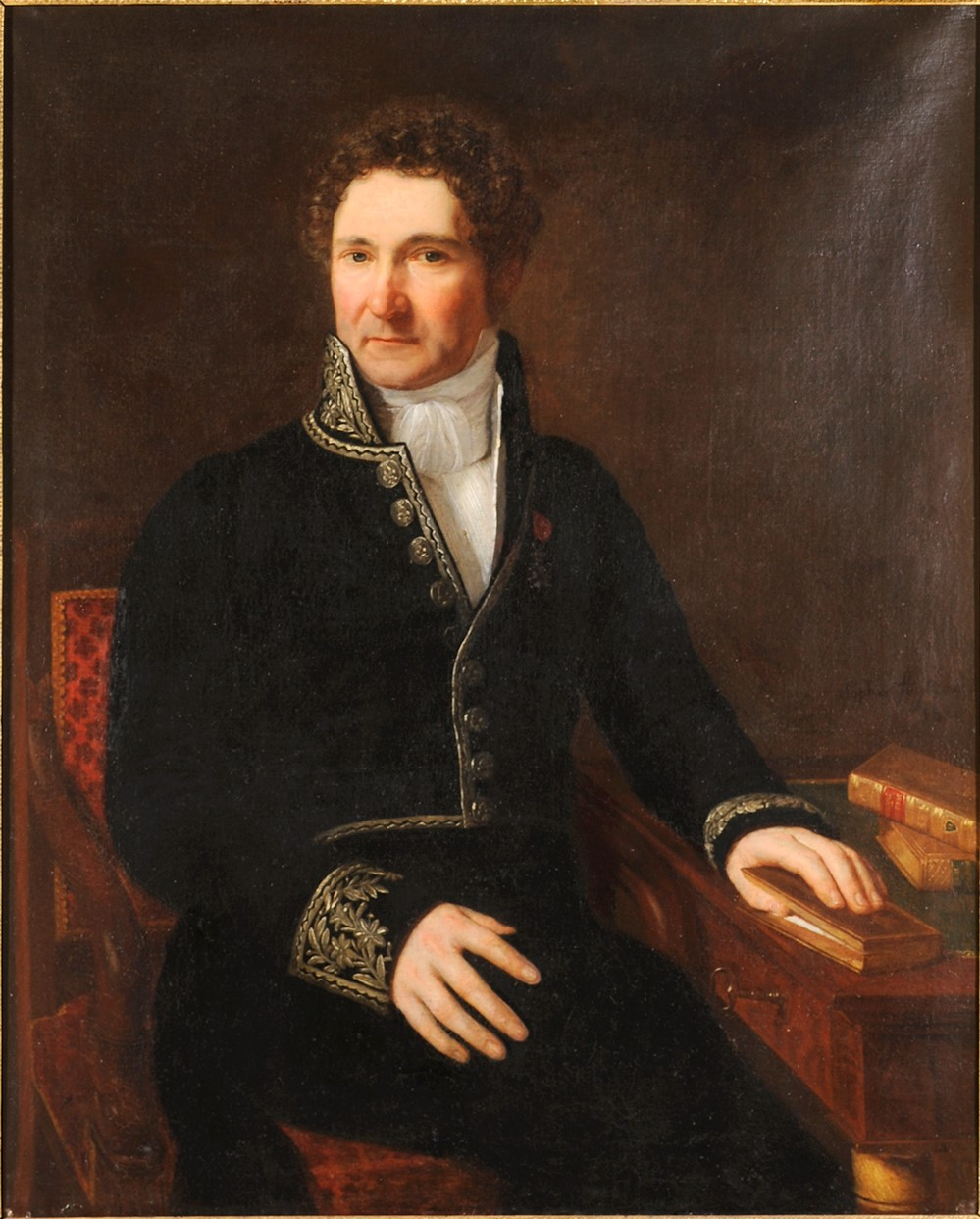

Prime Minister of France
- In office 4 January 1828 – 8 August 1829
- Monarch: Charles X
- Preceded by: Joseph de Villèle
- Succeeded by: Jules de Polignac

Member of the Chamber of Deputies for Lot-et-Garonne
- In office 5 October 1816 – 3 April 1832
- Preceded by: Pierre Charles Sylvestre
- Succeeded by: Jean Baptiste Bory de Saint-Vincent
- Constituency: Marmande

Personal details
- Born: 20 June 1778 Bordeaux, Gascony, France
- Died: 3 April 1832 (aged 53) Paris, Seine, France
- Resting place: Père Lachaise Cemetery
- Party: Ultra-royalist (1815–1828); Doctrinaires (1828–1830); Legitimist (1830–1832)
- Spouse: Élisabeth de Phéllipeaux (m. 1812; died 1832)
- Education: University of Bordeaux
- Profession: Lawyer, poet, vaudevillist

Jean-Baptiste Sylvère Gay, 1st Viscount of Martignac (20 June 1778 – 3 April 1832) was a moderate royalist French statesman during the Bourbon Restoration 1814–30 under King Charles X.

== Biography ==
Martignac was born in Bordeaux, France. In 1798 he became secretary to Emmanuel Joseph Sieyès; after serving for a while in the army, he turned to literature, producing several light plays. Under the Empire he practised with success as an advocate at Bordeaux, where in 1818 he became advocate-general of the cour royale. In 1819 he was appointed procureur-général at Limoges, and in 1821 was returned for Marmande to the Chamber of Deputies, where he supported the ultraroyalist policies of Villèle. In 1822 he was appointed councillor of state, in 1823 he accompanied the duc d'Angouléme to Spain as civil commissary; in 1824 he was created a viscount and appointed director-general of registration.

In contact with practical politics his ultra-royalist views were gradually modified in the direction of the Doctrinaires, and on the fall of Villèle he was selected by Charles X to carry out the new policy of compromise. On 4 January 1828 he was appointed minister of the interior, and, though not bearing the title of president, became the virtual head of the cabinet. He succeeded in passing the act abolishing the press censorship, and in persuading the king to sign the ordinances of 16 June 1828 on the Jesuits and the little seminaries.

He was exposed to attack from both the extreme left and the extreme right, and when in April 1829 a coalition of these groups defeated him in the chamber, Charles X, who had never believed in the policy he represented, replaced him by the prince de Polignac. Despite being dismissed, Martignac remained true to his legitimist principles: in March 1830, he voted against the Address of the 221 that criticized the Polignac ministry. During the revolution that followed he remained true to his legitimist principles. His last public appearance was in defence of Polignac in the Chamber of Peers in December 1830.

== Works ==
- Bordeaux au mois de Mars 1815 (1830)
- Essai historique sur les révolutions d'Espagne et l'intervention française de 1823 (1832).

Political offices
Preceded by Comte de Villèle	Prime Minister of France; 1828–1829	Succeeded by Prince de Polignac
