= Carmelite Monastery of Buda =

Historic theatre in Budapest, Hungary

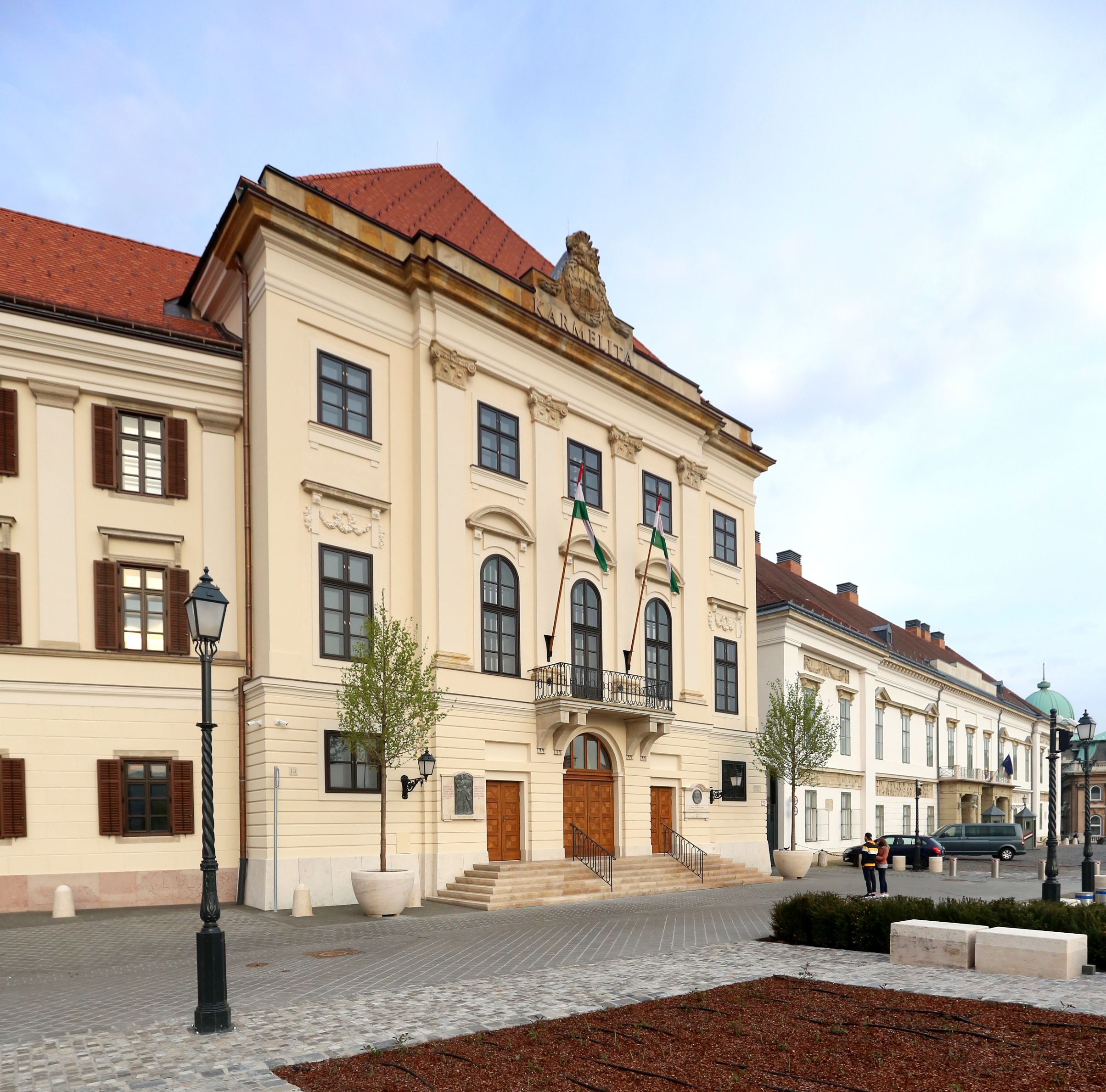

General information
- Architectural style: Baroque architecture
- Location: Budapest, Hungary, Várkerület, Színház street 1-3.
- Coordinates: 47°29′53.98″N 19°2′16.12″E
- Completed: 1736; 290 years ago
- Renovated: 1815, 1947, 1978, 2018

Design and construction
- Architects: Wolfgang von Kempelen, Gábor Zoboki

The Carmelite Monastery of Buda (Hungarian: Karmelita or Karmelita kolostor) is a building in the Castle Quarter of Budapest, the capital city of Hungary, that served as the seat of the Prime Minister of Hungary from 2019 until 2026. It was formerly a Carmelite Catholic monastery and theatre.

The Carmelite Order built the monastery on a parcel that had been occupied by a mosque during the Ottoman occupation of Hungary. The Order received the land in 1693 after the 1686 liberation of Buda, completed the monastery in 1736, and consecrated it in 1763. In the 1780s, Joseph II's Klostersturm forced the Carmelites to disband, and in 1786, an imperial decree converted the monastery into the Castle Theatre (Várszínház) "for the delectation of high-ranking court officials." Notable performances during the imperial era included Ludwig van Beethoven and the premiere of Bánk bán.

Heavily damaged during World War II, the theatre was renovated by the state communist government in 1971 to serve as the seat of the People's Theatre and, after 1982, the National Theatre. In 2001, the National Dance Theatre became the building's primary tenant. The Hungarian government appropriated the Carmelite Monastery in 2014 and began further renovations in 2016 to prepare it for use as the prime minister's office. The prime ministry moved into the building in 2019. On 12 May 2026, Orbán's successor Péter Magyar moved the prime minister's residence to a building that formerly housed the Ministry of Construction and Transport on Alkotmány utca 5.

== History ==
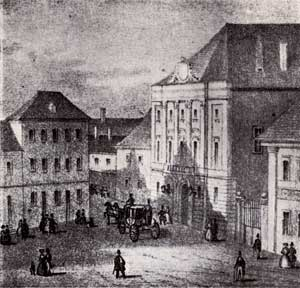
The Court Theatre of Buda in the 18th century

In the Middle Ages, the area was occupied by a Franciscan church devoted to St. John, built between 1269 and 1270. The building was converted to a mosque during the Turkish occupation, and was destroyed in the 1686 siege of Buda. The plot was given to the Carmelites in 1693. Laying the foundation stone in 1725, their church was built by 1736, but only consecrated in 1763.

Joseph II dissolved the order in 1784, and on his trip to Buda in 1786, he personally arranged to convert the church to a theatre, to entertain government officers of Buda. The plans were made by Wolfgang von Kempelen. A part of the crypt under the sanctuary was rebuilt as a trap room, and cells functioned as changing rooms. The high altar became the stage. With a three-story auditorium, and a capacity of 1200 seats, the premiere was held on 17 October 1787, from which on the theatre was home to mainly German productions for the next few decades. The first ever play in the Hungarian language was premiered on its stage, on 25 October 1790, by the company of László Kelemen. On 7 May 1800 Beethoven gave a concert here. The building was renovated in 1815.

According to a pact with the municipality of Buda, for a symbolic lease, a company from Kassa played in the theatre between 1833 and 1837, including acclaimed actors of the era, like Déryné, Márton Lendvay or Gábor Egressy. They formed the foundations of the later National Theatre opening in 1837. Until 1870, German troupes were playing in the building, when German plays were banned by the municipality. From 1871, the theatre was home to the National Theater, and from 1885 to 1886, also hosted plays of the Népszínház the Opera House, and the Academy of Drama.

After World War I, the theatre re-opened on 21 March 1918. Plans were made to make the theatre a chamber theatre of the National Theatre, but it was found unfit for the task. Smaller groups played in the building until 1924, when, after the gallery collapsed, it was closed for the next five decades. During World War II, it received severe bomb hits, collapsing the balcony. Until the end of the war, the building functioned as an army storage. Renovations took place in 1947.

The Várszínház was reopened on 13 February 1978, and was the home to the Népszínház until 1982, after which it was the chamber theatre of the National Theatre until 1 December 2001. From 2001 until 2019, it was the home of the National Dance Theatre (thus being a theatre only in its name). Between 2019 and 2026, the building has been a seat of the offices of the Prime Minister of Hungary.

== Sources ==
- - National Theatre in the Hungarian Theatrical Lexicon (György, Székely. Magyar Színházmuvészeti Lexikon. Budapest: Akadémiai Kiadó, 1994 ISBN 978-963-05-6635-3), freely available on mek.oszk.hu
- Aurél, Molnár. A Várszínház. Pécs : Szikra Nyomda, 1978. OCLC: 21774521
