= Bjarni Halldórsson =

Icelandic legal figure and theologian

- Born: 1703
- Disappeared: 1773
- Known for: Sýslumaður of Húnavatnssýsla county
- Spouse: Hólmfriður Vídalínsdóttir
- Children: Ástríður Bjarnadóttir, Þorbjörg Bjarnadóttir, Páll Bjarnasson, Jón Bjarnasson, and Halldór Vídalín

Bjarni Halldórsson (c. 1703 – 1773) was an Icelandic legal figure and theologian. He is best known for being a county magistrate. He first lived in Víðidalstungu but most of his life he lived in Þingeyrar.
