= Magnús Ketilsson =

Icelandic publisher and author

Magnús Ketilsson (29 January 1732 – 18 July 1803), was an Icelandic publisher and author. He ran Hrappsey Press, an Icelandic publishing company focused on non-religious publications. He published Islandske Maaneds Tidender (1773–1776), a periodical in the Danish language. He had an influence on the development of Icelandic spelling and grammar. He has been described as a leader of the neo-classic enlightenment movement in Iceland.

He studied at the University of Copenhagen. He became sýslumaður (district commander) of Dalasýsla in 1754.
