= Maussans =

- Commune
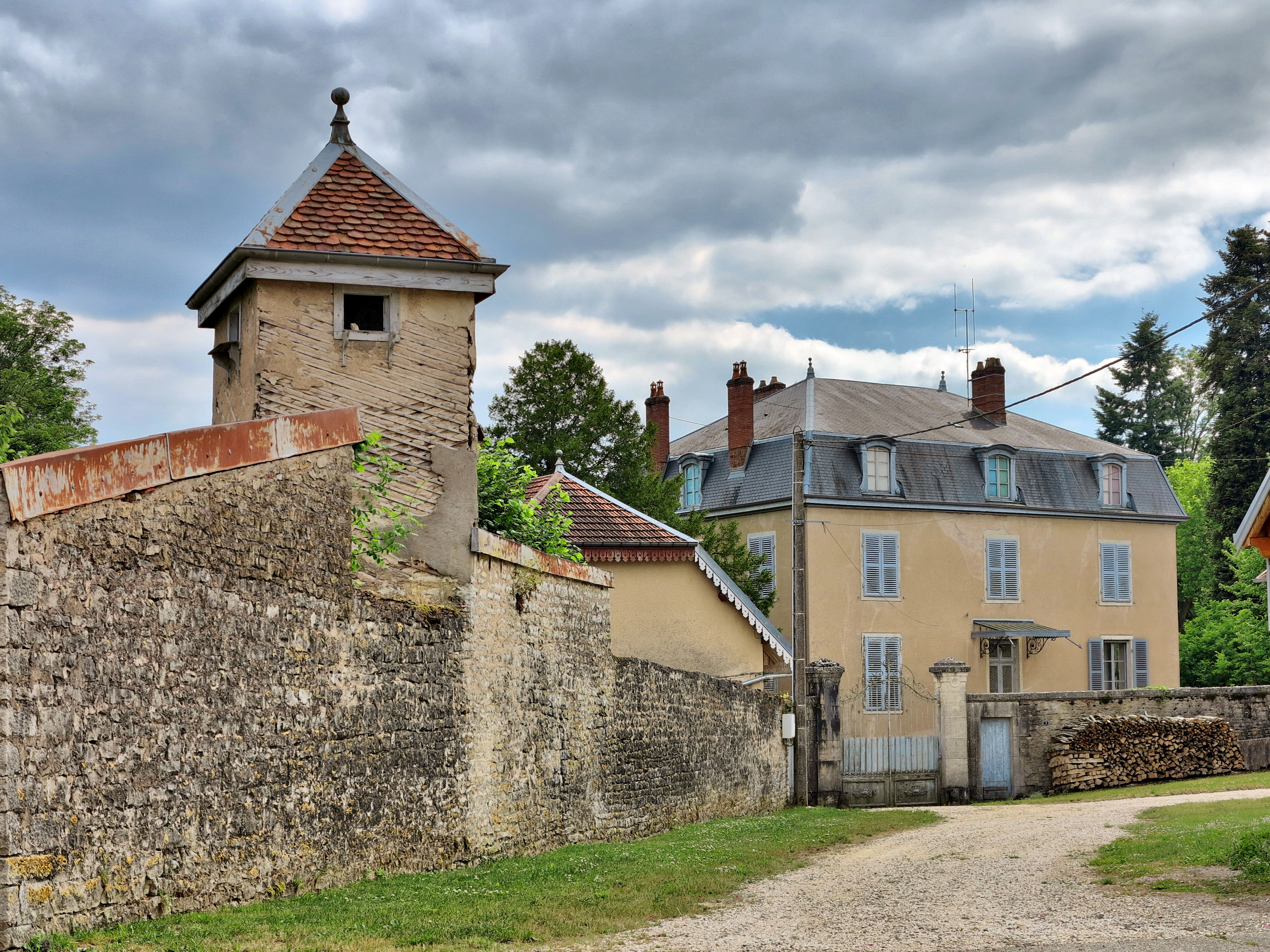
- The chateau in Maussans
- Location of Maussans
- Location within France Location within Bourgogne-Franche-Comté
- Coordinates: 47°25′55″N 6°15′13″E
- Country: France
- Region: Bourgogne-Franche-Comté
- Department: Haute-Saône
- Arrondissement: Vesoul
- Canton: Rioz

Government
  - Mayor (2020–2026): Pascal Marilly
- Area^{1}: 3.92 km^{2} (1.51 sq mi)
- Highest elevation: 308 m (1,010 ft)
- Lowest elevation: 235 m (771 ft)
- Population (2023): 56
  - Density: 14/km^{2} (37/sq mi)
- Time zone: UTC+01:00 (CET)
  - Summer (DST): UTC+02:00 (CEST)
- INSEE/Postal code: 70335 /70230
- ^{1} French Land Register data, which excludes lakes, ponds, glaciers > 1 km^{2} (0.386 sq mi or 247 acres) and river estuaries.

Maussans (French pronunciation: [mosɑ̃]) is a commune in the Haute-Saône department in the region of Bourgogne-Franche-Comté in eastern France.

== See also ==
- Communes of the Haute-Saône department
