= Joseph de Villèle =

Prime Minister of France from 1821 to 1828

The Count of Villèle
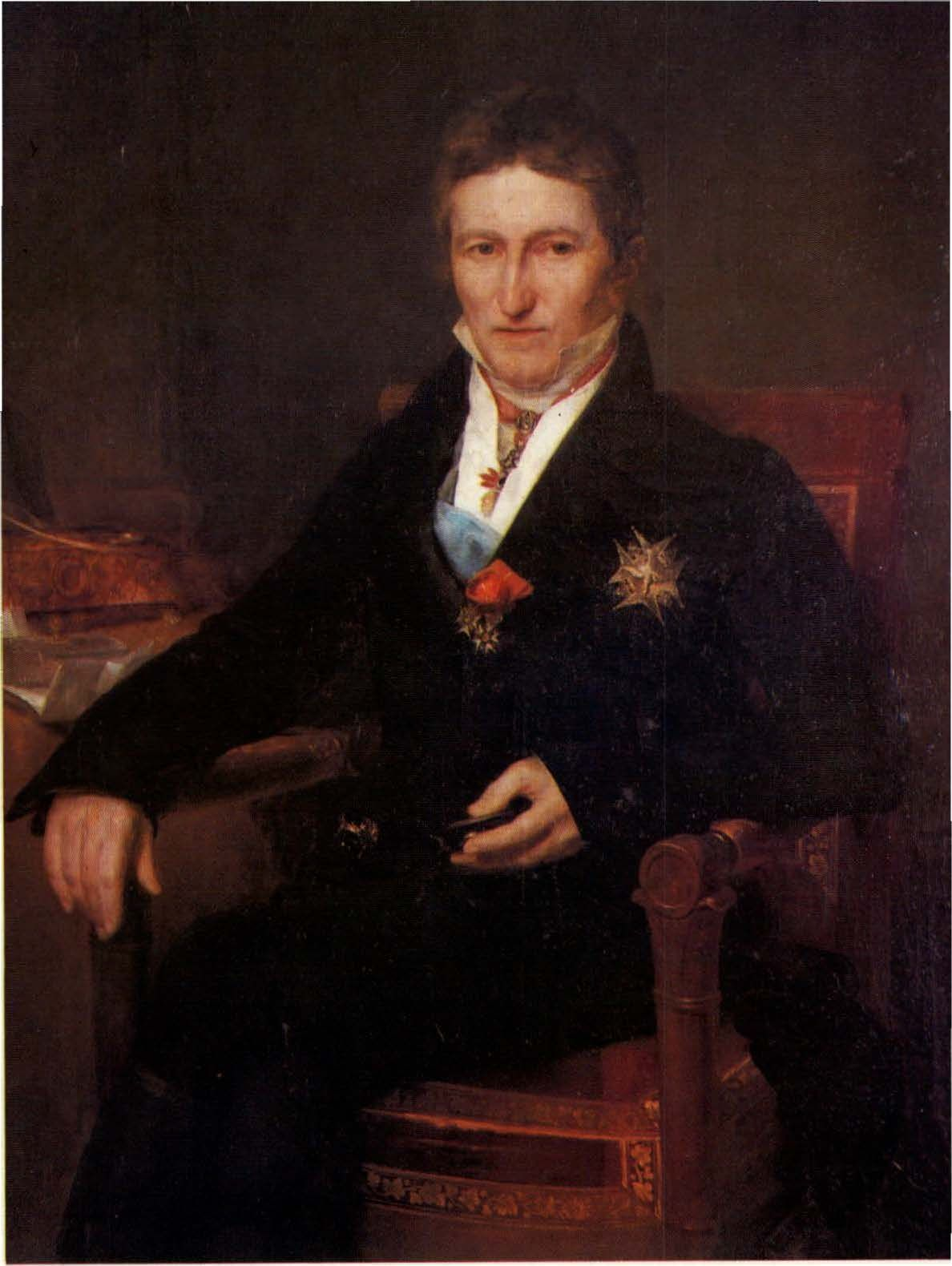
- Portrait by Jean-Sébastien Rouillard

Prime Minister of France
- In office 14 December 1821 – 4 January 1828
- Monarchs: Louis XVIII; Charles X
- Preceded by: Armand-Emmanuel du Plessis de Richelieu
- Succeeded by: Jean Baptiste de Martignac

Member of the Chamber of Deputies for Haute-Garonne
- In office 5 October 1816 – 5 July 1830
- Preceded by: Louis Emmanuel Dupuy
- Succeeded by: Blaise Vezian de Saint-André
- Constituency: Toulouse

Mayor of Toulouse
- In office 1815–1818
- Preceded by: Raymond Lanneluc
- Succeeded by: Guillaume de Bellegarde

Personal details
- Born: 14 April 1773 Toulouse, Languedoc, France
- Died: 13 March 1854 (aged 80) Toulouse, Haute-Garonne, French Empire
- Party: Ultra-royalist
- Spouse: Mélanie Panon Desbassayns (m. 1799; died 1854)
- Children: 5
- Profession: Land owner

Jean-Baptiste Guillaume Joseph Marie Anne Séraphin, 1st Count of Villèle (14 April 1773 – 13 March 1854), better known simply as Joseph de Villèle (/vɪˈlɛl/; French: [vilɛl]), was a French statesman who served as the Prime Minister of France from 1821 to 1828. He was a leader of the Ultra-royalist faction during the Bourbon Restoration.

== Youth ==
Joseph de Villèle was born on 14 April 1773 in Toulouse. He was brought up to go into the navy, and he joined the "Bayonnaise" at Brest in July 1788. He served in the West and East Indies. Arrested in the Isle of Bourbon (now Réunion) under the Reign of Terror, he was freed by the Thermidorian Reaction (July 1794). In 1796 he helped oust Baco and Burnel, who had come to the island to enforce the 1794 abolition of slavery. He acquired a plantation and sixty slaves, and in 1799 he married the daughter of M. Desbassyns de Richemont, whose estates he had managed.

Villèle served in the Colonial Assembly from 1799-1803. The arrival of General Decaen, appointed by Napoleon Bonaparte in 1802, restored security to the island, and five years later Villèle, who had now accumulated a large fortune, returned to France. He was mayor of his commune, and a member of the council of the Haute-Garonne under the Empire.

== The Bourbon Restoration (1815–1830) ==
At the Bourbon Restoration of 1814 he at once declared for the royalist principles. He was mayor of Toulouse in 1814–15 and deputy for the Haute-Garonne in the ultra-royalist Chambre introuvable of 1815.

Villèle, who before the promulgation of the charter had written some Observations sur le projet de constitution, opposing it as too democratic in character, naturally took his place on the extreme right with the ultra-royalists. In the new Chamber of 1816 Villèle's party was in a minority, but his personal authority nevertheless increased. He was looked on by the ministerialists as the least unreasonable of his party, and by the "ultras" as the safest of their leaders.

Under the electoral law of 1817 the Abbé Grégoire, who was popularly supposed to have voted for the death of Louis XVI in the convention, was admitted to the Chamber of Deputies. The Conservative party gained strength from the alarm raised by this incident and still more from the shock caused by the assassination of the duc de Berry. The duc de Richelieu was compelled to admit to the cabinet two of the chiefs of the "ultras", Villèle and Corbière. Villèle resigned within a year, but on the fall of Richelieu at the end of 1821 he became the real chief of the new cabinet, in which he was minister of finance.

Although not himself a courtier, he was backed at court by Sosthene de la Rochefoucauld and Madame du Cayla, and in 1822 Louis XVIII gave him the title of count and made him formally prime minister. He immediately proceeded to muzzle opposition by stringent press laws, and the discovery of minor liberal conspiracies afforded an excuse for further repression. Forced against his will into interference in Spain by Mathieu de Montmorency and Chateaubriand, he contrived to reap some credit for the monarchy from the successful campaign of 1823.

Meanwhile, he had consolidated the royal power by persuading Louis XVIII to swamp the liberal majority in the upper house by the nomination of twenty-seven new peers; he availed himself of the temporary popularity of the monarchy after the Spanish campaign to summon a new Chamber of Deputies. This new and obedient legislature, to which only nineteen liberals were returned, made itself into a septennial parliament, thus providing time, it was thought, to restore some part of the ancien regime.

Villèle's plans were assisted by the death of Louis XVIII and the accession of his brother, Charles X, a staunch believer in absolute monarchy. Prudent financial administration since 1815 had made possible the conversion of the state bonds from 5 to 3%. It was proposed to utilize the money set free by this operation to indemnify by a billion francs (Le milliard des émigrés) the émigrés for the loss of their lands at the Revolution; it was also proposed to restore their former privileges to the religious congregations.

Both these propositions were, with some restrictions, secured. Sacrilege was made a crime punishable by death with the 1825 Anti-Sacrilege Act (Loi contre le blasphème), and the ministry were preparing a law to alter the law of equal inheritance, and thus create anew the great estates. These measures roused violent opposition in the country, which a new and stringent press law, nicknamed the "law of justice and love," failed to put down. The peers rejected the law of inheritance and the press law; it was found necessary to disband the National Guard; and in November 1827 seventy-six new peers were created, and recourse was had to a general election. The new Chamber proved hostile to Villèle, who resigned to make way for the short-lived moderate ministry of Martignac.

The new ministry made Villèle's removal to the upper house a condition of taking office, and he took no further part in public affairs. At the time of his death, he had advanced as far as 1816 with his memoirs, which were completed from his correspondence by his family as Mémoires et correspondance du comte de Villèle (Paris, 5 vols., 1887–90).

== See also ==
- Anti-Sacrilege Act
- Franco-Trarzan War of 1825
- Ultra-royalist

== Bibliography ==
- C. de Mazade, L'Opposition royaliste (Paris, 1894)
- J. G. Hyde de Neuville
- Notice sur le comte de Villèle (Paris, 1899)
- M. Chotard, "L'Œuvre financière de M. de Villèle," in Annales des sciences politiques (vol. v., 1890).

Political offices
Preceded by Duc de Richelieu	Prime Minister of France; 1821–1828	Succeeded by Vicomte de Martignac
French nobility
Preceded by Title created	Count of Villèle; 1822–1851	Succeeded by Louis de Villèle
