= Francisco José Freire =

Portuguese historian and philologist (1719–1773)

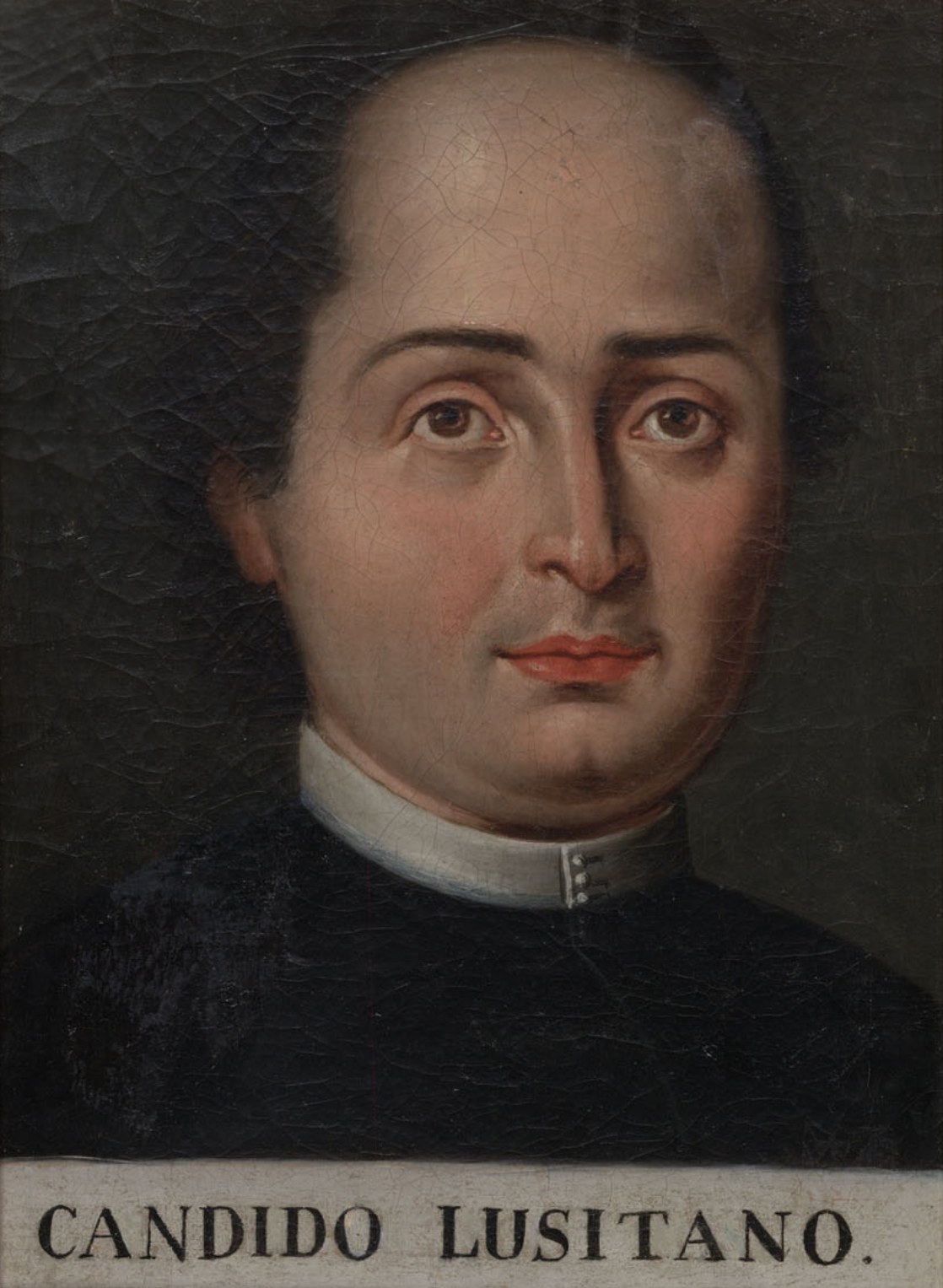
Cândido Lusitano

Francisco José Freire (Portuguese pronunciation: [fɾɐ̃ˈsiʃku ʒuˈzɛ ˈfɾɐjɾɨ]) (3 January 1719, Lisbon.– 5 July 1773) was a Portuguese historian and philologist.

He belonged to the monastic society of St Philip Neri, and was a zealous member of the literary association known as the Academy of Arcadians, in connexion with which he adopted the pseudonym of Cândido Lusitano. He contributed much to the improvement of the style of Portuguese prose literature, but his endeavour to effect a reformation in the national poetry by a translation of Horace's Ars poetica was less successful.

The work in which he set forth his opinions regarding the vicious taste pervading the current Portuguese prose literature is entitled Maximas sabre a Arte Oratoria (1745) and is preceded by a chronological table forming almost a social and physical history of Portugal. His best known work, however, is his Vida do Infante D. Henrique (1758), which has given him a place in the first rank of Portuguese historians, and has been translated into French (Paris, 1781).

He also wrote a poetical dictionary (Diccionario poetico) and a translation of Racine's Athalie (1762), and his Reflexions sur la langue portugaise was published in 1842 by the Lisbon society for the promotion of useful knowledge.

Freire died at Mafra on 5 July 1773.
