= Amable Guillaume Prosper Brugière, baron de Barante =

French statesman and historian (1782–1866)

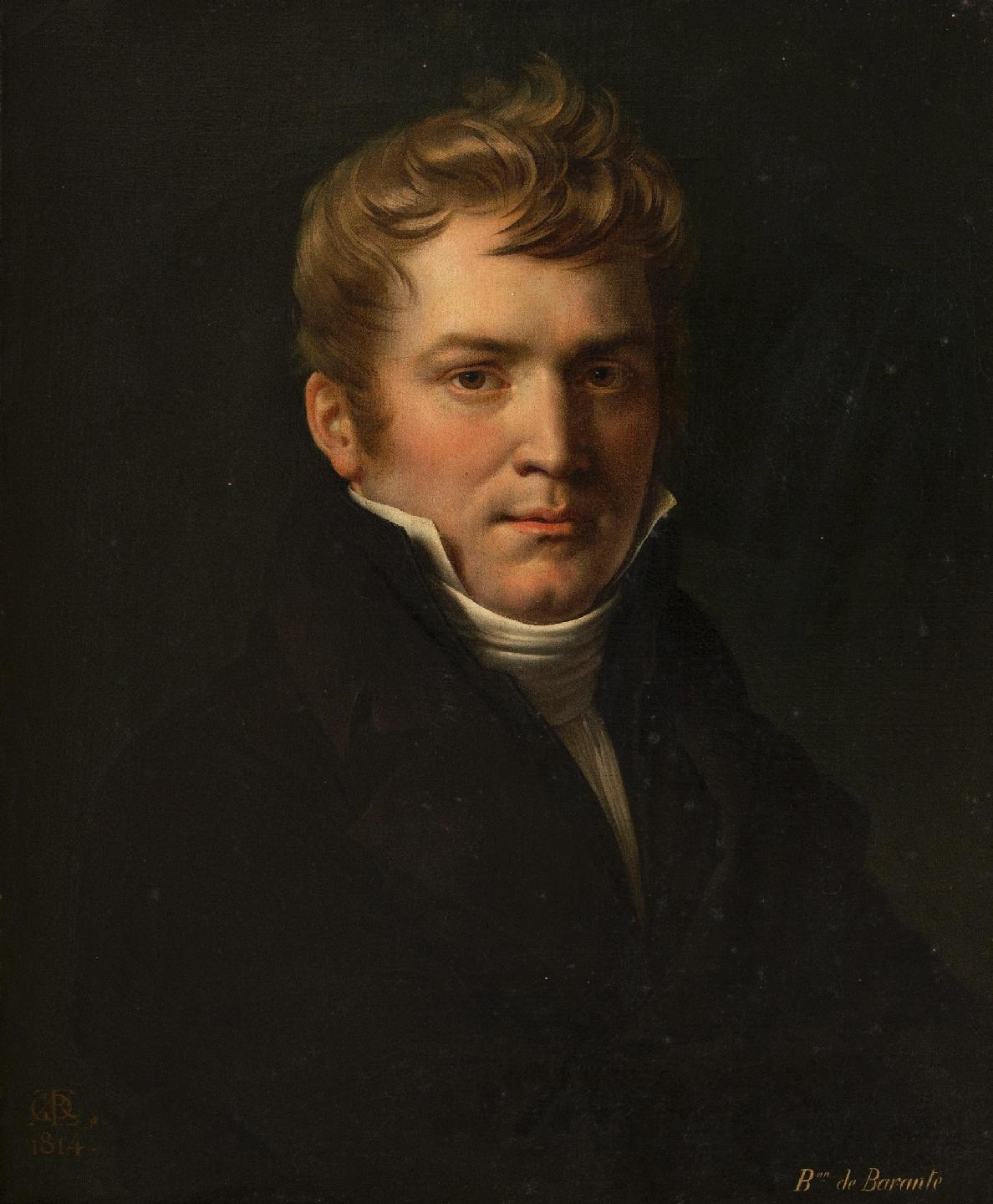
Amable Guillaume Prosper Brugière, baron de Barante.

Amable Guillaume Prosper Brugière, baron de Barante (June 10, 1782 – November 22, 1866) was a French statesman and historian. Associated with the center-left, he was described in France as the first man to call himself, "without any embarrassment or restriction, a Liberal."

== Life ==
Barante was born at Riom, Puy-de-Dôme, the son of an advocate. At the age of sixteen he entered the École Polytechnique at Paris, and at twenty obtained his first appointment in the civil service. His abilities secured him rapid promotion, and in 1806 he obtained the post of auditor to the council of state. After being employed in several political missions in Germany, Poland, and Spain, during the next two years, he became prefect of Vendée.

At the time of the return of Napoleon I he held the prefecture of Nantes, and this post he immediately resigned. On the second restoration of the Bourbons he was made councillor of state and secretary-general of the ministry of the interior. After filling for several years the post of director-general of indirect taxes, he was created in 1819 as a peer of France and was prominent among the Liberals.

After the revolution of July 1830, Barante was appointed ambassador to Turin, and five years later to St Petersburg. Throughout the reign of Louis Philippe he remained a supporter of the government; and after the fall of the monarchy, in February 1848, he withdrew from political affairs and retired to his country seat in Auvergne. Shortly before his retirement he had been made grand cross of the Legion of Honour.

He died at the Castle of Barante, near Thiers, in 1866.

== Works ==
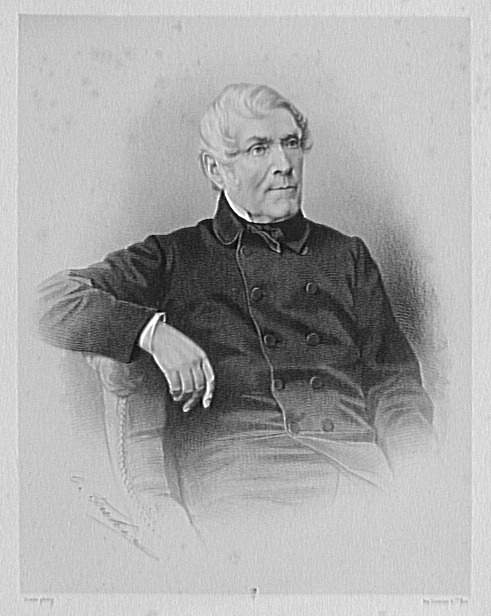
Barante in his later years.

Barante's Histoire des ducs de Bourgogne de la maison de Valois, which appeared in a series of volumes between 1824 and 1828, procured him immediate admission to the Académie Française. Its narrative qualities, and purity of style, won high praise from the romantic school, but it exhibits a lack of the critical sense and of scientific scholarship. Amongst his other literary works are:

- a Tableau de la littérature française au dix-huitième siècle, of which several editions were published
- Des communes et de l'aristocratie (1821)
- a French translation of the dramatic works of Schiller
- Questions constitutionnelles (1850)
- Histoire de la Convention Nationale, which appeared in six volumes between 1851 and 1853
- Histoire du Directoire de la République française (1855)
- Études historiques et biographiques (1857)
- La Vie politique de M. Royer-Collard (1861)

The version of Hamlet for Guizot's Shakespeare was his work.

His Souvenirs were published by his grandson (Paris, 1890–99).
