= Víðidalstunga =

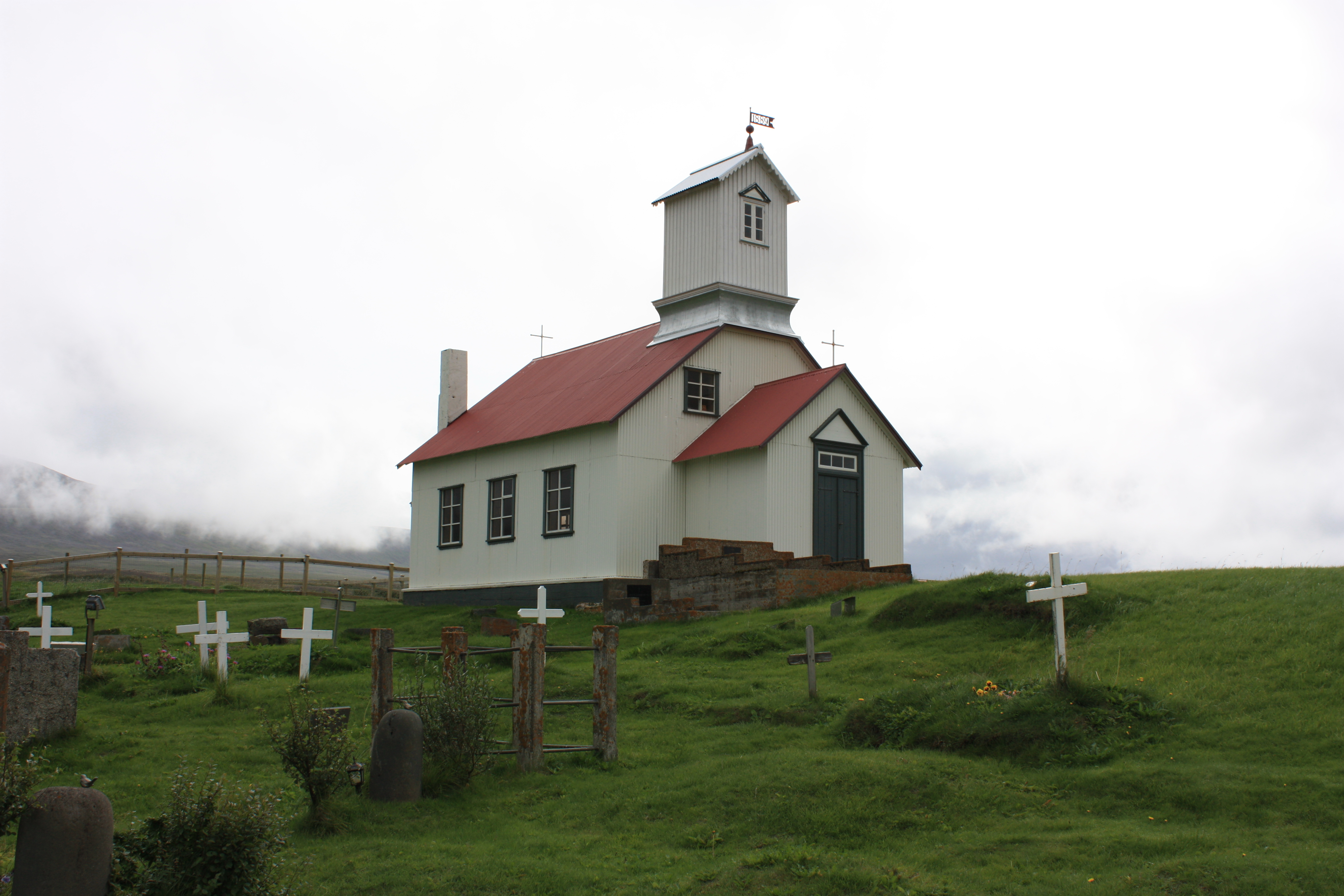
- Nickname: Víðidalstungukirkja
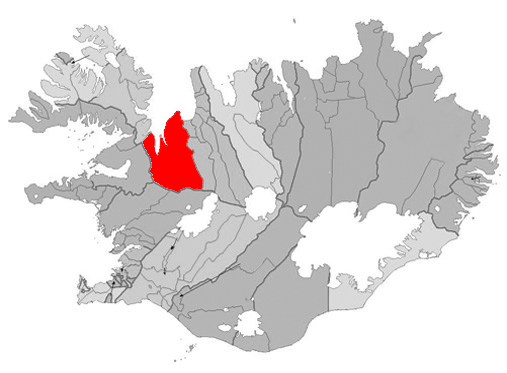
- Location of the Municipality of Húnaþing vestra

- Location of Víðidalstunga in Iceland
- Coordinates: 65°21′N 20°36′W
- Country: Iceland
- Constituency: Northwest Constituency
- Region: Northwestern Region
- Municipality: Húnaþing vestra

Víðidalstunga (Icelandic pronunciation: [ˈviːðɪˌtalsˌtʰuŋka]) is a small farm in Víðidalur in the former parish of Þorkelshólshreppur, Vestur-Húnavatnssýsla, Iceland.

An ancient manor and noble family lived in the area was centuries since at least the early 14th century. Víðidalstungu Church was built in 1889 and contains an altar with paintings by the painter Ásgrímur Jónsson.
