= Hóp (Iceland) =

Lake in Iceland

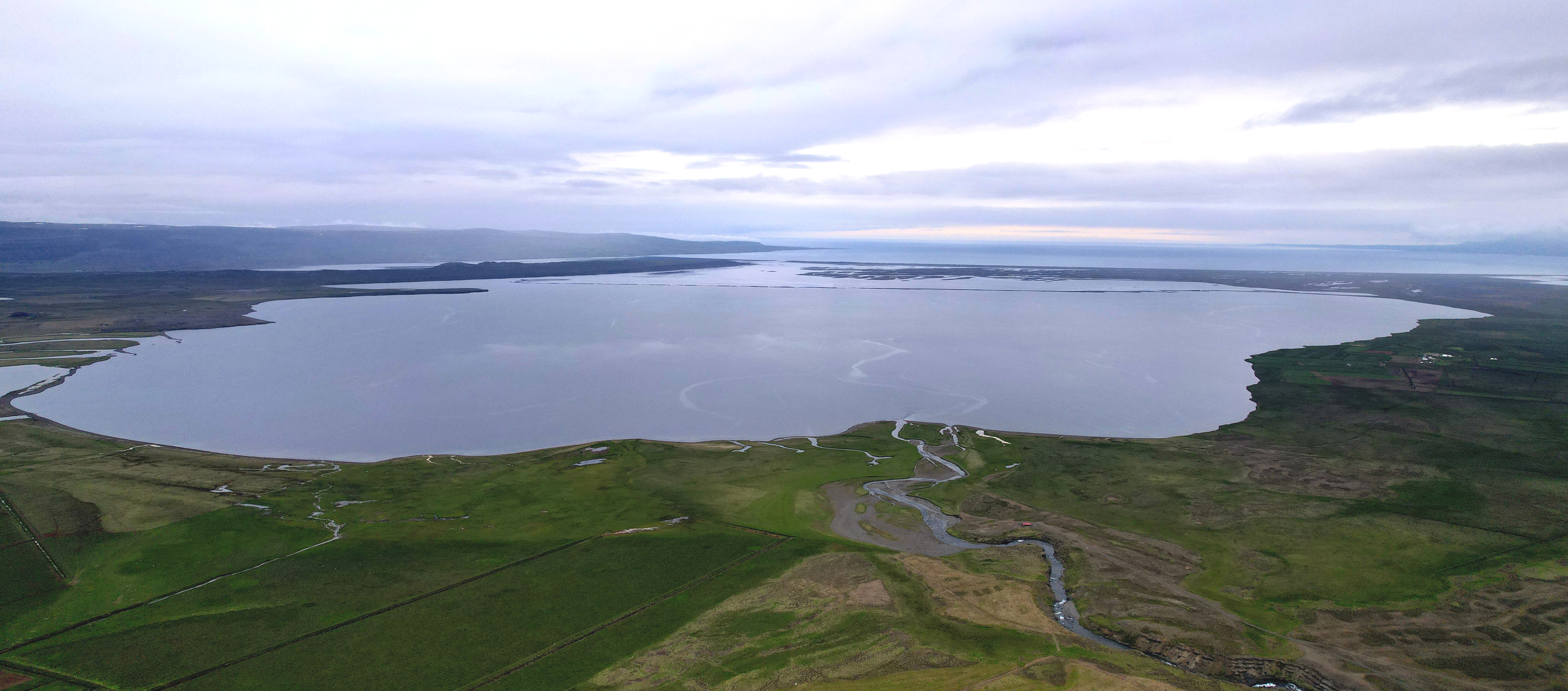

- Location within Iceland
- Coordinates: 65°32′N 20°30′W
- Basin countries: Iceland
- Surface area: 29–44 km^{2} (11–17 sq mi)
- Max. depth: 9 m (30 ft)

The lake Hóp (Icelandic pronunciation: [ˈhouːp]) is situated in the north of Iceland near Blönduós at the Húnafjörður.

In reality, the lake is more of a lagoon than a lake. Its surface area depends on the tides and oscillates between 29 and 44 km^{2}. Its greatest depth is 9 m.

== See also ==
- List of lakes of Iceland
