= Kelemen László =

Hungarian stage dramatist and theater director

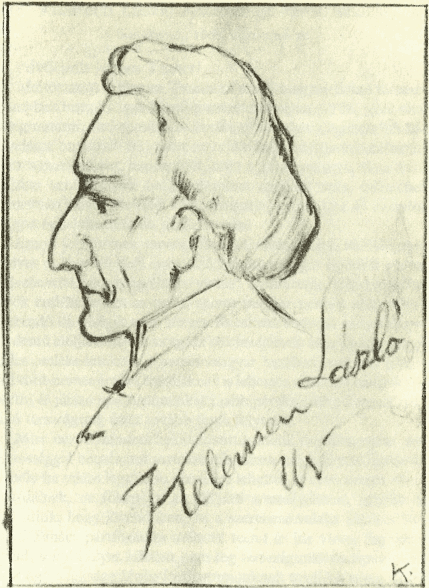
- Born: July 26, 1762; Kecskemét, Kingdom of Hungary
- Died: 24 December 1814 (aged 52); Csanádpalota, Kingdom of Hungary

Kelemen László (1762–1814) was a Hungarian stage dramatist and theater director. He played a major pioneer role in Hungarian theater history as the founder of the first professional Hungarian language theater company in Hungary, for which he also produced plays.
