= Alexandre-François Vivien =

French lawyer and politician

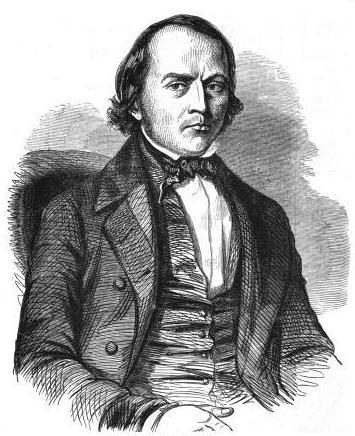
- Portrait from Journées illustrées de la Révolution de 1848
- Born: 3 July 1799; Paris, France
- Died: 7 June 1854 (aged 54); Paris, France
- Occupation: Politician

Alexandre François Auguste Vivien (or Vivien de Goubert; 3 July 1799 – 7 June 1854) was a French lawyer and politician. He was Minister of Justice during the July Monarchy, and Minister of Public Works in the French Second Republic.

== Early years ==
Alexandre François Auguste Vivien was born on 3 July 1799 in Paris. He was the son of a lawyer in Goubert. At first he meant to follow a military career, but he changed to studying for the bar. He became an advocate in Amiens in 1820, then in Paris in 1826. In 1825 he wrote a book on gambling and its effect on individuals and families.

== July Monarchy ==
Vivien was among the new men who were sought by the July Monarchy. He did not play any role in the July Revolution, but on 10 August 1830 was appointed Attorney General of the Royal Court of Amiens. He was appointed Prefect of Police on 21 February 1831, replacing Jean-Jacques Baude. He was criticized for excessive zeal by the opposition, but also was criticized for lack of decisiveness on the Republican riots in April and July 1831. He disagreed with the Minister of the Interior, Casimir Pierre Périer, and had to give way to Henri Gisquet on 17 September 1831, when he became a State Councillor.

Vivien was elected a deputy on 17 February 1833 for the Saint-Quentin extramural arrondissement, and reelected until 1848. He maintained an independent position in the house, and played a leading role in the debates over the laws concerning the organization of department and arrondissement councils in 1833. He was a member of the center-left opposition, but was appointed to chair the Legislation Committee on 13 October 1839. He was made Minister of Justice on 1 March 1840 in the cabinet of Adolphe Thiers. When the cabinet of François Guizot came into power on 29 October 1840 he joined the opposition to the royalists. He became president of the legislative committee of the Council of State on 25 December 1843. On 26 December 1845 he entered the Academy of Moral and Political Sciences.

== Second Republic ==
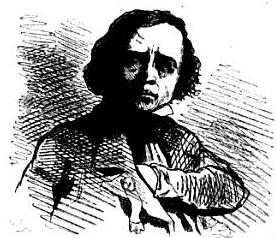
Caricature of Vivien by Cham (1850)

Vivien did not support the February Revolution of 1848, but on 23 April 1848 was elected to represent Aisne in the Constituent Assembly. He was made a member of the Constitution Committee, where he played a prominent role as a Conservative. In the Assembly he voted in favor of actions to restore calm, against the abolition of the death penalty and for the expedition to Rome.

From 13 October 1848 to 10 December 1848 Vivien was Minister of Public Works in the cabinet of General Louis-Eugène Cavaignac. He was one of the three candidates presented by President Louis-Napoléon Bonaparte for the office of vice president of the Republic; he came second. He was named president of the Legislation Section of the Council of State in April 1849.

After the coup d'état of 2 December 1851 he retired from public life. Vivien died on 7 June 1854 in Paris from pneumonia. He was aged 54.

== Works ==
- Le Joueur ou Les Jeux dans leurs conséquences sur la moralité des individus et la fortune des familles (Paris, 1825, in-8°)
- Traité de la législature des théâtres (1830)
