= Henri Georges Boulay de la Meurthe =

Vice president of France from 1849 to 1852

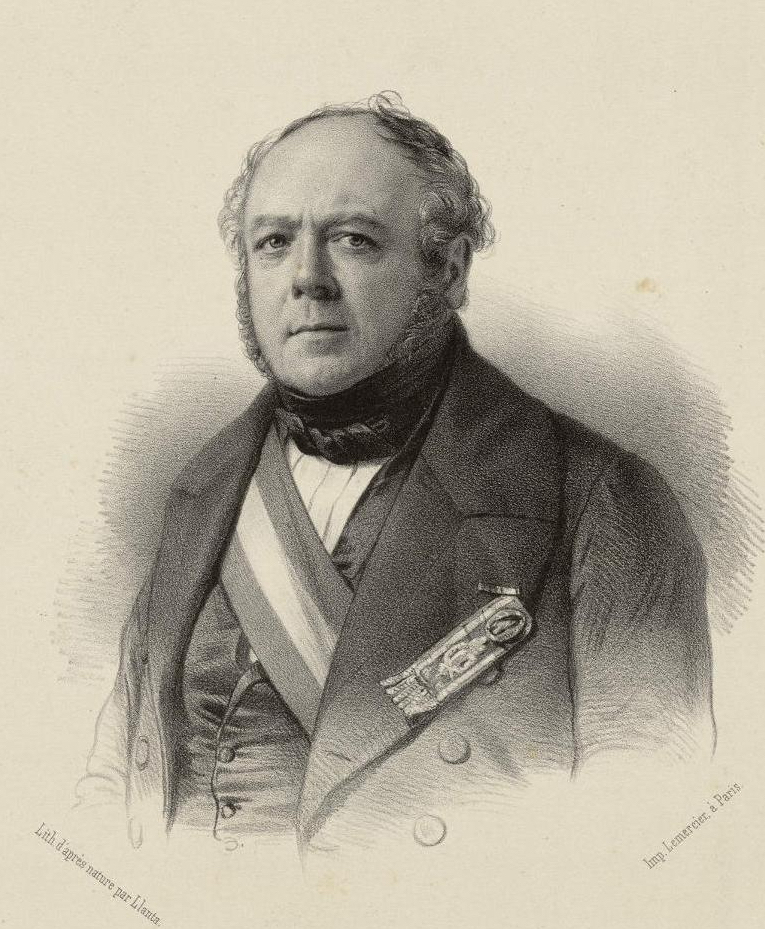

Vice President of France
- In office 20 January 1849 – 29 March 1852
- President: Louis-Napoléon Bonaparte
- Preceded by: Office established
- Succeeded by: Office abolished

Personal details
- Born: 15 July 1797 Nancy, France
- Died: 24 November 1858 (aged 61) Paris, France

Henri Georges Boulay de la Meurthe, 2nd Count Boulay de La Meurthe (15 July 1797 – 24 November 1858) was a French politician who served as vice president from 1849 to 1852, and is the only person to ever have that title.

== Biography ==
He was born in Nancy, France in 1797.

A staunch Republican and Bonapartist, he was elected to the Provisional Assembly in 1848, and was elected to the newly established office of vice president on 20 January 1849. He served until 29 March 1852, when the office was omitted in the new Constitution proclaimed in the aftermath of Louis-Napoleon Bonaparte's coup d'état. He served in the Senate from 26 January 1852 until his death on 24 November 1858.

He died in Paris, France on 24 November 1858 at the age of 61.
