= Achille Baraguey d'Hilliers =

Marshal of France and politician (1795–1878)

Achille Baraguey d'Hilliers 1st Comte Baraguey d'Hilliers
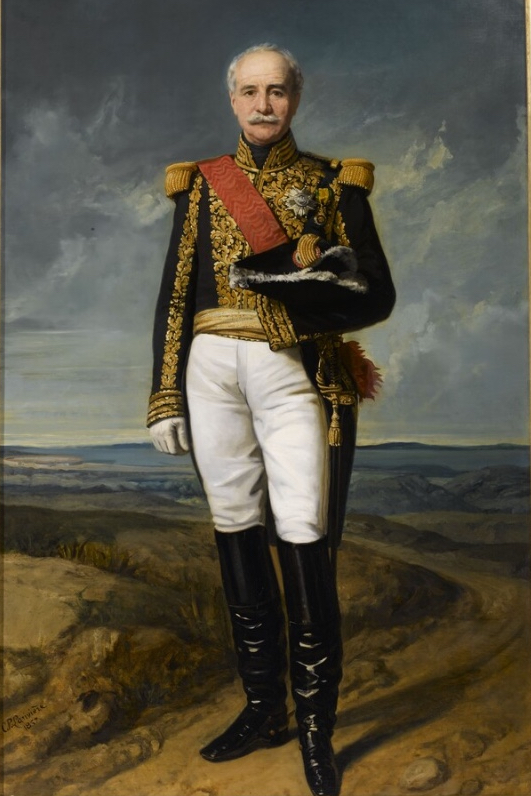
- Portrait by Charles-Philippe Larivière, 1857
- Born: September 6, 1795; Paris, French First Republic
- Died: June 6, 1878 (aged 82); Amélie-les-Bains, French Third Republic
- Education: Prytanée National Militaire
- Relatives: Louis Baraguey d'Hilliers (father); Charles-Marie Denys de Damrémont (brother-in-law)
- Military career
- Allegiance: France
- Branch: Grande Armée; French Army
- Rank: Marshal of France
- Commands: Constantine
- Conflicts: Napoleonic Wars; Hundred Thousand Sons of Saint Louis; Invasion of Algiers (1830); Crimean War; Second Italian War of Independence; Franco-Prussian War
- Other work: Politician

Louis-Achille Baraguey d'Hilliers, 1st Comte Baraguey d'Hilliers (French: [aʃil baʁaɡɛ dijje]; 6 September 1795 – 6 June 1878), was a Marshal of France and politician.

Baraguey d'Hilliers was born in Paris, the son of the French revolutionary general Louis Baraguey d'Hilliers. He was educated at the Prytanée National Militaire and joined the Grande Armée. Baraguey d'Hilliers served as a second lieutenant in the Russian campaign of 1812, and in 1813 was an aide-de-camp to Marshal Marmont at the Battle of Leipzig, where he lost his left hand. Promoted to captain in 1815, he fought at Quatre Bras. In 1823, he served in the campaign to restore Bourbon power in Spain, where he remained until 1825.

He distinguished himself in Algeria, where he was promoted to colonel after the capture of Algiers in 1830. In 1834, Baraguey d'Hilliers was made vice-governor of the military academy of Saint Cyr, promoted to général de brigade in 1836, he was made commandant of the academy. Sent to Algeria in 1841, by 1843 he had been promoted to général de division and was made commandant of Constantine. Put on the non active list in 1844, by 1847 he was reinstated and made Inspector-General of infantry. After the Revolution of 1848, Nicolas Changarnier was sent as commanding general to Besançon and was elected to the constituent assembly for the department of Doubs. He was one of the three candidates presented by President Louis-Napoléon Bonaparte for the office of vice president of the Republic; he received only one vote. He was then appointed commander-in-chief of the French troops that invaded the revolutionary Roman Republic, in 1849, in the context of the First Italian War of Independence.

Oriental Army of the Crimean campaign by Gustav Bartsch. From left to right: Admiral Ferdinand-Alphonse Hamelin, Lord Lucan, Lord Raglan, Admiral Dundas, Sir John Campbell, Duke of Cambridge, Lord Cardigan, Ismail Pasha, Omer Pasha, Muhlis Pasha (Grigore Sturdza), Sultan Abdülmecid I, Said-Bey (Vasile Obedeanu), Ahmed Pasha, col. Desmaret, Marshal Baraguey d'Hilliers, Prince Napoleon, col. Trochu, Marshal de Saint-Arnaud, general Bosquet, general de Canrobert

In 1851, he replaced as commander of the army of Paris Nicolas Changarnier, whom President Napoleon Louis Bonaparte distrusted, and was a supporter of the latter's coup d'état later in that year. In 1853, Baraguey d'Hilliers was sent to Constantinople as ambassador extraordinaire, and recalled in 1854. During the Crimean War he was given command of the expeditionary force destined for the Baltic Sea. After capturing Bomarsund, Baraguey d'Hilliers was promoted to Marshal of France and made a Senator of the French Second Empire. He would later serve as vice-president of the French Senate. During the Italian campaign of 1859, Baraguey d'Hilliers commanded the I Corps with which he distinguished himself by capturing the town of Solferino during the Battle of Solferino. After the war he was given command of V Corps in Tours.

Made governor of Paris in 1870, by his frankness he made himself unpopular with the Empress Eugénie and with Count Palikao. On 12 August, he was replaced by Trochu. After the end of the Franco-Prussian War, Adolphe Thiers made him president of a commission investigating the causes of the French defeat. He died in 1878 in Amélie-les-Bains.

== Honours ==
- Second French Empire: Baton of Maréchal de France
- Second French Empire: Grand Croix of the Legion of Honour
- Second French Empire: Médaille militaire
- Second French Empire: Commemorative medal of the 1859 Italian Campaign
- Second French Empire: Saint Helena Medal
- United Kingdom: Crimea Medal
- Kingdom of Sardinia: Knight of the Supreme Order of the Most Holy Annunciation
- Kingdom of Sardinia: Grand Cross of the Order of Saints Maurice and Lazarus
