= Vice President of France =

1848–1852 French government office

Vice President of the French Republic
- Vice-président de la République française
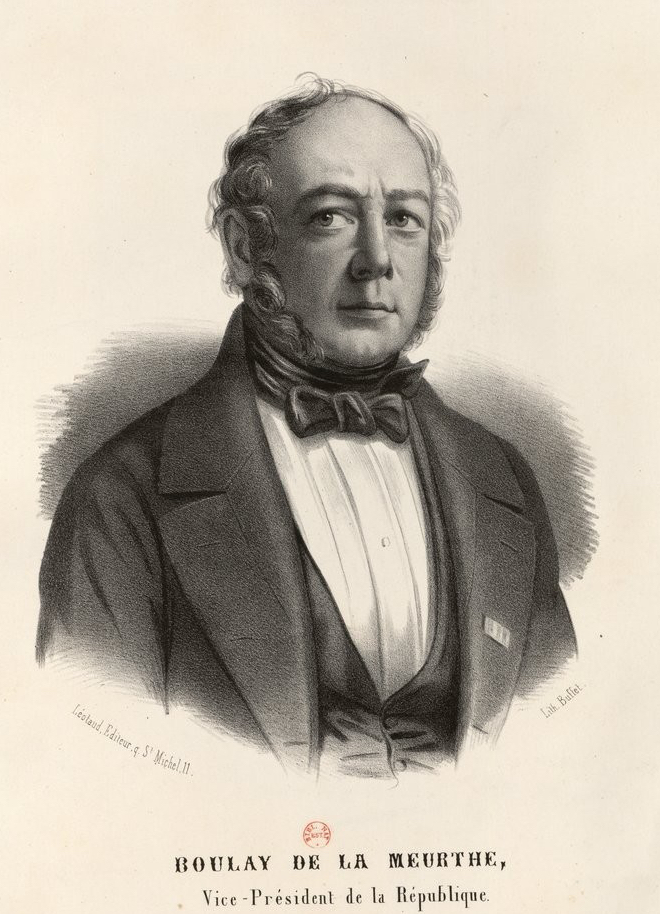
- Henri Georges Boulay de la Meurthe (1849–1852)
- Status: Second highest in executive branch President of the Council of State
- Reports to: President
- Nominator: President (three names)
- Appointer: National Assembly
- Term length: Four years Renewable after four years
- Constituting instrument: Constitution of 1848
- Formation: 20 January 1849; 177 years ago
- First holder: Henri Georges Boulay de la Meurthe
- Final holder: Henri Georges Boulay de la Meurthe
- Abolished: 29 March 1852; 174 years ago

The vice president of the Republic (French: vice-président de la République) was an office that existed in France only during the Second Republic (1848–1852), and only ever had one holder, Henri Georges Boulay de la Meurthe, elected in January 1849.

It was never re-established, despite occasional discussions in the founding years of the Fifth Republic. The president of the Senate (upper house) is designated to step in as acting president.

== Selection and duties ==
The vice presidency was established at the start of the Second Republic by the Constitution of 4 November 1848, specifically its articles 45, 70 and 71. It was broadly inspired by the vice president of the United States, as were some other features of the new constitution, which created France’s closest experiment towards a presidential system, with the introduction of a president, an office the First Republic had done without.

The holder, however, was not elected alongside the president on a ticket, but in an indirect election by the National Assembly (legislature) within the month after the presidential election (a direct election), from a list of three names proposed by the new president. In order to avoid dynastic links after the toppling of the July Monarchy, members of the president's family ("relations or kindred of the President to the sixth degree inclusive") were barred from the office. Like the president, the vice president could only be re-elected, or be elected as president himself, after an interval of four years.

Also, the vice president was to step in as acting president if the president was incapacitated, but not to ascend the office if it became vacant: a new president was to be elected within a month.

The vice president was ex officio the president of the Council of State, a position that has always been occupied by a member of the executive (today the prime minister).

Henri Georges Boulay de la Meurthe was elected to the new office on 20 January 1849, as the preferred choice of President Louis-Napoléon Bonaparte, who had also proposed Count Achille Baraguey d’Hilliers and Alexandre-François Vivien. He was a devoted and discreet supporter of Bonaparte for the next three years; one biographer wrote that he was "always withdrawing, meddling in nothing, not even in his prerogatives". He supported his Coup of 2 December 1851; although he formally remained Vice President, the Constitution of 1848 was in effect suspended until the Constitution of 1852 came into force on 29 March and abolished the office. He was compensated with a lifetime seat in the re-established Senate.

== 1849 vice presidential election ==
Candidate	Votes	%
Henri Georges Boulay de la Meurthe	417	60,00%
Achille Baraguey d’Hilliers	1	0,14%
Alexandre-François Vivien	277	39,86%
Total cast	695	100,00%
Majority	348	
Blank ballots	19	

The order was the one in which President Bonaparte had presented his three candidates, in a letter of 18 January. The election was held on 20 January. Although the Constitution did not specify a voting system, the president of the Assembly stated that the election required a majority of the votes cast; it was achieved in one round. Boulay de la Meurthe was immediately sworn in.

== Later systems ==
During the Second Empire (1852–1870), two influential figures, the Duke of Morny, an illegitimate half-brother of Napoleon III, and Eugène Rouher, were nicknamed "the Vice Emperor".

The interim of the presidency in case of an incapacitation or a vacancy was devolved to the Council of Ministers (government) during the Third Republic (1875–1940), to the president of the National Assembly (lower house) during the Fourth Republic (1946–1958), and to the president of the Senate (upper house) under the Fifth Republic (1958–present).

In the 1960s, after the founding years of the Fifth Republic, there were proposals within the right-wing majority to create a vice presidency, some linked to the perspective of turning it into a presidential system. One was put forward privately by Jacques Chaban-Delmas, the president of the National Assembly, to President Charles de Gaulle after he escaped the Petit-Clamart attack in 1962, and there were discussions at the 3rd UNR Conference in November 1963, which, by coincidence, was held in the days after the assassination of John F. Kennedy. Others were made by Pierre Marcilhacy in 1964 and by Paul Coste-Floret and Achille Peretti in 1966. De Gaulle and his entourage, however, saw this as a manoeuvre to ease his retirement, and the proposals came to nothing; he said of a potential vice president: "He would be my widow."

Influential personalities in the executive branch with a close personal connection to the president, or a strong enough position to bypass the prime minister, have sometimes been referred to as "Vice President", for example Claude Guéant, who was secretary general of the Presidency, then minister of the interior under Nicolas Sarkozy, and previously his chief of staff and presidential campaign manager; and Ségolène Royal, as minister for sustainable development under François Hollande, the two being a former couple of three decades and the parents of four children.
