= Jean-Jacques Baude =

French administrator and politician

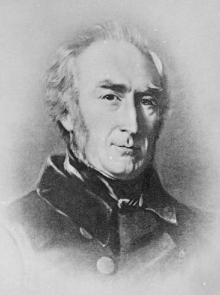
- Born: Valence, Drôme, France
- Died: Paris, France
- Occupations: Administrator, politician

Jean-Jacques Baude (19 February 1792 - 6 February 1862) was a French administrator and politician. He was a deputy from 1830 to 1839, and again from 1842 to 1846.

== Early years ==
Baron Jean-Jacques Baude was born in Valence, Drôme on 19 February 1792, where his father was Attorney General. He started work in his father's office in the prefecture of Tarn. Towards the end of the reign of Napoleon he joined the administration. He was appointed in turn sub-prefect of Confolens on 8 April 1813, sub-prefect of Roanne on 2 November 1814 and sub-prefect of Saint-Étienne on 4 June 1815. Baude recognized Louis XVIII in the first restoration, but on the return of Napoleon placed himself at the head of the guards who opposed the advance of the Duke of Angoulême on Lyon.

After the battle of Waterloo he resigned and published Le Lundi gras et le mercredi des Cendres (Fat Monday and Ash Wednesday), which was condemned by the royal court of Grenoble. He then became involved in financing public works. He wrote a remarkable work on Navigation de la Loire au-dessus de Briare in 1826. He continued to attack the government in the liberal press. As editor of Le Temps he signed the protest of journalists against the ordinances of King Charles X of France.

== July Monarchy ==
The July Revolution, which brought his political friends to power, at first gave Baude an important place in the Orléanist party. He was named Secretary of the Municipal Commission of Paris on 29 July 1830. On 1 August 1830 he was named Secretary General of the Ministry of the Interior, and for a few days was acting Minister until François Guizot took the portfolio on 11 August 1830. He was then general director of bridges and roads, and of mines, and Councillor of State. On 28 October 1830 he was elected a Deputy for the department of the Loire. On 10 November, when the Count of Montalivet succeeded Guizot, Baude was appointed Under-Secretary of State for the Interior. On 26 December 1830 he replaced Treilhard at the Prefecture of Police, and remained in charge until 25 February 1831.

On 14 February 1831, the anniversary of the death of Charles Ferdinand, Duke of Berry, Baude had to deal with disturbance that were suppressed by the National Guard. This led to questions in the Assembly and he was replaced. On 15 March 1831 Baude presented a proposal supported by the president of the council, Casimir Périer, that was adopted, to ban king Charles X, his descendants and allies of his descendants, in perpetuity from French territory. This was adopted after discussions and amendments.

Baude failed to be reelected on 5 July 1831. On 1 March 1832 he was elected for Roanne. He generally voted for the majority. He was reelected on 21 June 1834, on 4 November 1837 and on 9 July 1842. He failed to be reelected on 1 August 1846, which ended his career in the Assembly. After returning to private life he authored various papers on the navigation of the Loire, the Isthmus of Suez, Algeria, and the Channel coast (1859). He died in Paris on 6 February 1862.

== Honours ==
- Grand Cordon in the Order of Leopold.
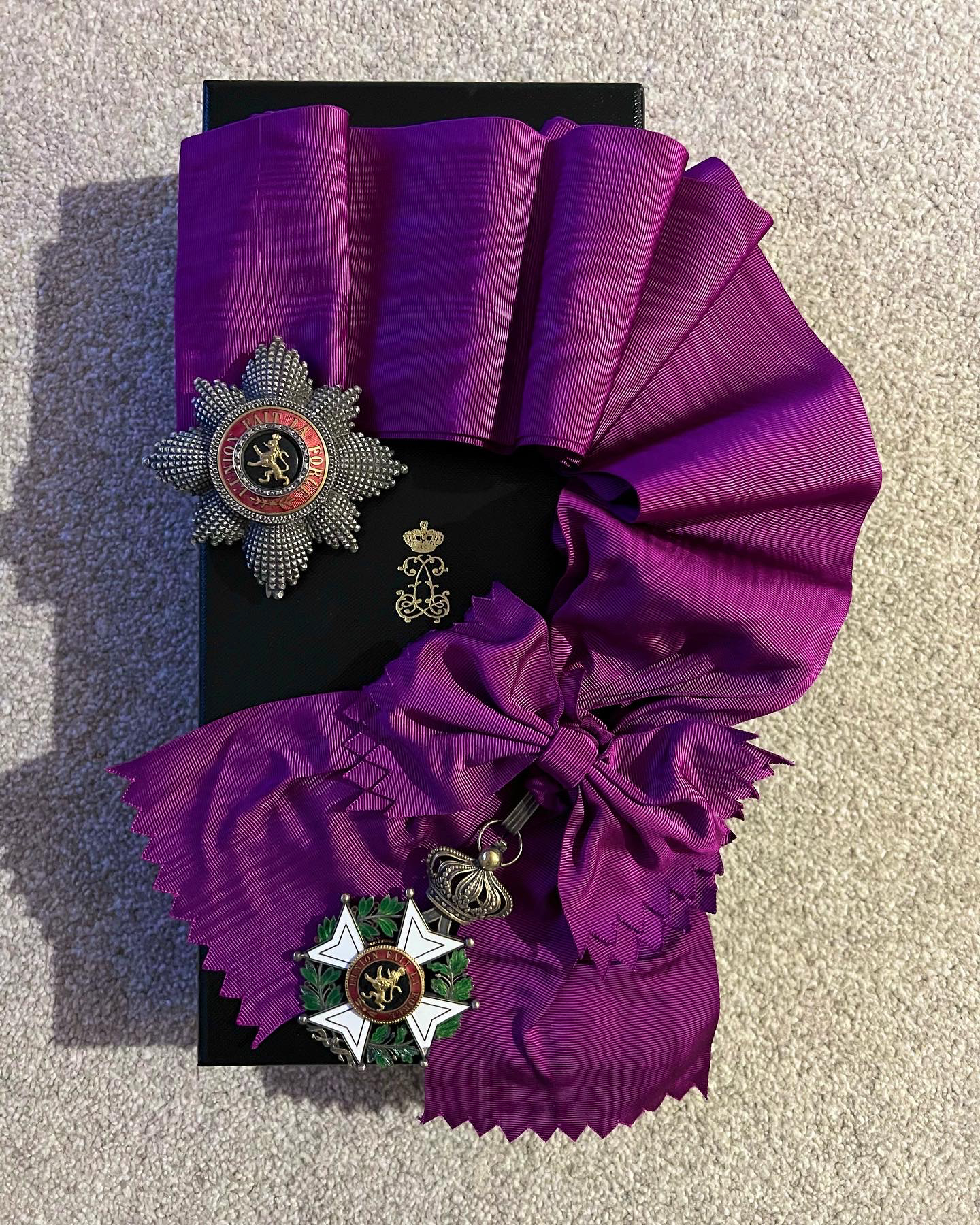
  the grand Order of Leopold

== Publications ==
Publications included:

- Le Lundi gras et le mercredi des Cendres, 1817, in-8
- Navigation de la Loire, 1826, in-8
- L'Algérie, Paris, A. Bertrand, 1841, 2 vol. in-8
- Les Côtes de la Manche. Cherbourg, Paris, Impr. de J. Claye, 1859, in-8 (Extrait de la Revue des Deux Mondes, livraisons des 15 décembre 1858 et 15 janvier 1859)
