= Casimir Pierre Périer =

French statesman (1777–1832)

Casimir Perier
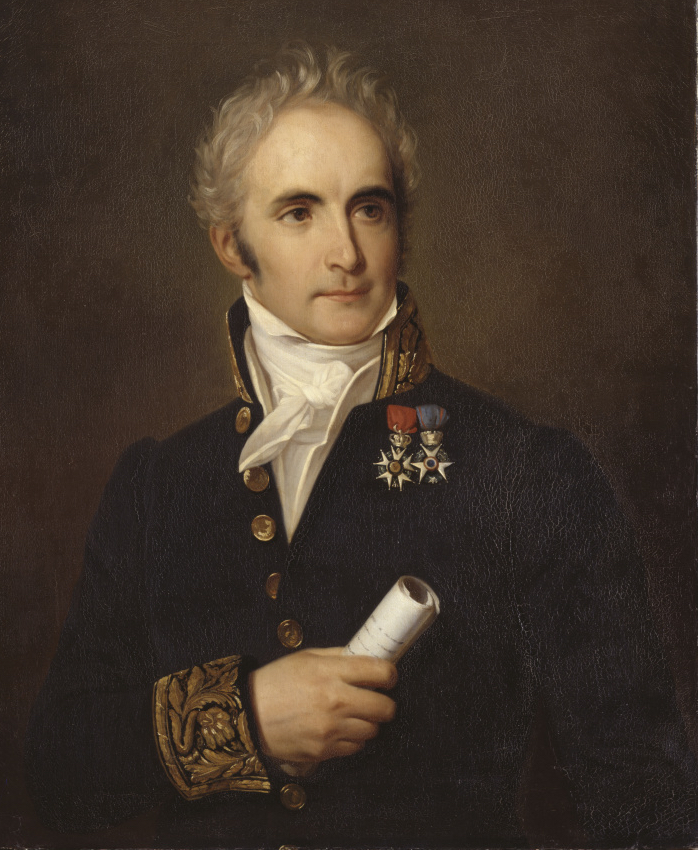
- Portrait by Louise Adélaïde Desnos, 1843

Prime Minister of France
- In office 13 March 1831 – 16 May 1832
- Monarch: Louis Philippe I
- Preceded by: Jacques Laffitte
- Succeeded by: Jean-de-Dieu Soult

President of the Chamber of Deputies
- In office 11 November 1830 – 31 May 1831
- Monarch: Louis Philippe I
- Preceded by: Jacques Laffitte
- Succeeded by: Amédée Girod de l'Ain
- In office 6 August 1830 – 21 August 1830
- Monarch: Louis Philippe I
- Preceded by: Pierre Paul Royer-Collard
- Succeeded by: Jacques Laffitte

Member of the Chamber of Deputies for Aube
- In office 18 November 1827 – 16 May 1832
- Preceded by: Victor Alexandre Masson
- Succeeded by: Nicolas Vernier-Guérard
- Constituency: Troyes

Member of the Chamber of Deputies for Seine
- In office 21 September 1817 – 17 November 1827
- Preceded by: Élie Decazes
- Succeeded by: Nicolas Bavoux
- Constituency: Paris (3rd arrondissement)

Personal details
- Born: 11 October 1777 Grenoble, France
- Died: 16 May 1832 (aged 54) Paris, France
- Resting place: Père Lachaise Cemetery
- Party: Doctrinaires (1817–1830); Resistance Party (1830–1832)
- Spouse: Pauline Loyer (m. 1805; died 1832)
- Children: Auguste; Paul
- Education: Oratory of Lyon
- Profession: Banker, industrialist

Casimir-Pierre Périer (French: [kazimiʁ pjɛʁ peʁje]; 11 October 1777 – 16 May 1832) was a French banker, mine owner, political leader and statesman. In business, through his bank in Paris and ownership of the Anzin Coal Co. in the Department of Nord, he contributed significantly to the economic development of France in the early stages of industrialization. In politics, he was a leading liberal member of the Chamber of Deputies throughout the Bourbon Restoration and president of the chamber at the outset of the July Revolution of 1830. He led the liberal-conservative Resistance Party in support of the constitutional monarchy of Louis-Philippe I. He became president of the Council of Ministers and Minister of Interior in the spring of 1831 (13 March 1831 – 16 May 1832). Although his ministry was brief, his strong government succeeded in restoring order at home and keeping peace abroad. He fell victim to the cholera epidemic in France in 1832.

== Biography ==
=== Early life ===
Born in Grenoble, Casimir Perier was the fourth of the eight sons of "Milord" Claude-Nicolas Perier (1742–1801), the rich merchant-manufacturer and banker who opened his Château de Vizille to the famous meeting of the Estates of Dauphiné (21 July 1788) foreshadowing the French Revolution. His mother was the former Marie-Charlotte Pascal (1749–1821), the daughter of a prominent linens manufacturer at nearby Voiron. Both his father and grandfather (Jacques Perier, 1702–82) made their fortunes in the commerce of canvas and linen cloths. Claude added the manufacture of printed cotton cloths (Indiennes) at the Château de Vizille, which he purchased in 1780 from Gabriel Louis de Neufville, duc de Villeroy. The Revolution and Napoleon opened up new opportunities for families of the wealthy "bourgeoisie grenobloise" such as the Periers. Claude Perier shifted the center of his business affairs to Paris, where he took up residence beginning in 1794 (rue Saint-Honoré) and mingled with leading French financiers. In 1795 he invested in and became a director of the largest coal mining company in northern France, the Anzin Company; in 1796 he helped to found a major investment bank in Paris, the Caisse des Comtes Courants; and in 1799, shortly after Napoleon's coup d’état of Brumaire, he became one of the founders and first directors of the famous Bank of France.

Claude Perier died on 6 February 1801, leaving his remarkably large family of ten children to share his enormous estate valued at 5,800,000 francs. Casimir, who was twenty-four years old at the time, inherited shares in the Anzin Company, land at Grenoble (Department of Isère) and in common with his brother Scipion, the property in Paris on the rue Saint-Honoré. He'd had little experience in business or banking. His father had anticipated that the three eldest brothers, Augustin, Alexandre and Scipion, would carry on the family businesses at Grenoble/Vizille. Casimir himself gave no clear indication of a specific career choice. He was intelligent, energetic, handsome and eager to succeed, but he had spent his life mostly as a student and received a church-school and Jesuit-tutor classical education. During service with the army in Italy from 1799 to 1800, he began to consider a military career, but his father's death and legacy, the lure of Paris, and his close friendship with his older brother Scipion took him in a much different direction.

=== Business career ===
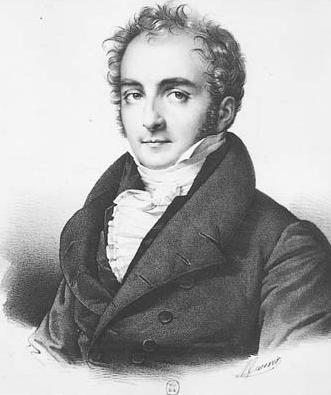
Perier in his 30s.

The two brothers, Casimir and Scipion, founded a bank in Paris (8 June 1801), located at No. 8, Place Vendôme until 1809, and after that year at No. 27, rue Neuve du Luxembourg (now the rue Cambon). Henry Flory and William Sabatier, who were former associates with their father at the Bank of France and the Anzin Company, respectively, helped to get the bank started. The youngest Perier brother, Joseph, joined the bank in 1822, approximately one year after the death of Scipion. The affairs of the older Perier bank at Grenoble were by then administered mainly by another younger brother, Alphonse. The bank of "Perier Frères" in Paris, which played a significant and leading role in the early stages of the industrial revolution in France, would be near the peak of its success in the 1820s, numbering importantly by then among a small and select group of private banking houses known collectively as the Parisian Haute Banque. Scipion became a regent of the Bank of France in 1818, Casimir in 1820. They both became members of the influential Chamber of Commerce of Paris.

The two most important clients of the Perier bank were the Anzin Coal Company (Department of Nord) and the Perier-owned iron foundry and workshops in Paris at Chaillot. The founder-owner of the Chaillot firm, Jacques-Constantin Perier (1742–1818), who was not related to the Paris bankers, was well known for having brought the Watt steam engine to France. Famously, he used a Watt engine at Chaillot to provide Paris with water pumped from the Seine. In 1802 he supplied the Anzin Company with twenty of his engines for winding and drainage at the mines. Casimir and Scipion Perier purchased the Chaillot firm in 1818 and used its workshops to upgrade Anzin with more efficient Cornish high-pressure engines patented in France by Arthur Woolf. Chaillot was an important part of the most notable entrepreneurial achievement of the Periers during the Restoration, namely, the renovation, managerial reorganization and business expansion of Anzin.

The Anzin Coal Company, which was established in 1757 as a closely held, family-owned firm managed by a self-perpetuating board of six directors, fell on hard times during the Revolution until rescued in 1795 by heavy investments from wealthy representatives of la grande bourgeoisie . Thus Claude Perier became a director of the company. The firm did reasonably well after 1795, although most of the new outsiders ("les Parisiens") who joined the founding families looked on Anzin as simply one of many investments. Not so Casimir and Scipion Perier, who determined to become active owner-directors for purposes of renovating and re-energizing the company for increased production and maximization of profits. The Perier bank in Paris became the company bank, regulating Anzin's accounts and contracts and supervising its large reserve funds. The brothers gradually took over making company policies. They were a good team. Scipion had the broad knowledge of the science and technology of the times (he was a long-standing member of the Society for the Encouragement of National Industry, est. 1801); Casimir acted as the determined, driving force for innovation and risk-taking as opposed to the 'old ways' and too cautious decision-making. He was Anzin's ‘ homme fort’ during the rejuvenation of the company in the 1820s. His much-quoted 1826 general report on Anzin company affairs illustrated the thoroughness of his knowledge of his firm's needs and potential. One measure of success during the Restoration was that output of coal at the mines increased from 250,000 metric tons in 1816 to 509,000 tons in 1830.

In association with other prominent bankers and business leaders, the Periers also engaged in the establishment of new financial institutions of the Restoration. Thus in 1818 Casimir and Scipion were among the founder-directors of the first French savings bank, the Caisse d’Épargne et de Prévoyance de Paris (No. 104, rue Richlieu). Besides the Perier bank, other investors included Jacques Laffitte (governor of the Bank of France, 1814–19) and the banks of Lefebvre, Pillet Will, and Cottier. The same five banking houses helped back the organization during 1816-20 of an important early insurance company, the Compagnie Royale d’Assurances, and in 1823 they would take part in the Compagnie des Quatre Canaux, a joint-stock company for loans to the government to improve the canal system in northern France. Perhaps a best example of the Perier bank's involvement in innovative financial ventures during the Restoration was the case of the ill-starred Société Commanditaire de l’Industrie. Conceived in 1825 mainly by Jacques Laffitte, its prospective president, this joint-stock company capitalized at 100 million francs was intended to help remedy the growing need in France for increased investment capital for large-scale projects in areas such as mining, metallurgy, canal construction and land development. It had the support of the haute banque and foreign banking houses. Casimir Perier and William Ternaux, France's leading woolens manufacturer, were its prospective vice-presidents. But in the end, unfortunately, the conservative Villèle ministry under Charles X refused to authorize the establishment of the Commanditaire.

Casimir Perier's policy as a banker was to spread his capital investment over a wide range of characteristic early nineteenth century business enterprise. He engaged as well in almost continuous investment in land and real estate, calculated most recently at about 15% of his total investments during 1815-30. Most notable were his purchases of highly valued properties on the rue Neuve du Luxembourg, the rue Sainte-Honoré and the Champs-Elysées; a summer residence in the Bois de Boulogne; the Château Saint-Pierre ('le Taillis') in Normandy, near Rouen; and the parkland and ruins of the Château Pont-sur-Seine (Department of Aube), a property owned previously by Napoleon that was destroyed by invading armies in 1814. Casimir's largest investment in Paris real estate during the Restoration was made in 1829-30 when he agreed to pay 744,600 francs for properties on the rue Saint-Honoré owned by Francis Egerton, Duke of Bridgewater. By the time of the Revolution of 1830, Casimir Perier was one of the richest men in Paris. At the age of 55 in 1832, when he died of cholera, his estate was estimated at close to 14 million francs.

Both Casimir and Scipion Perier valued education and believed strongly in the advancement of science and technology. They supported Joseph Degérando's Société pour l’Amélioration de l’Enseignement Élémentaire (est. 1815) and they arranged at Anzin for night-school instruction for workers using courses designed by Charles Dupin. In Paris, they supported the practical education programs provided by the École Spéciale de Commerce, founded in 1816, and the École Centrale des Arts et Manufactures established in 1828. After Casimir was elected to the Chamber of Deputies in 1817, he would vote to protect the budgets of the Conservatory of Arts and Sciences and trade schools in the departments.

=== Political career ===
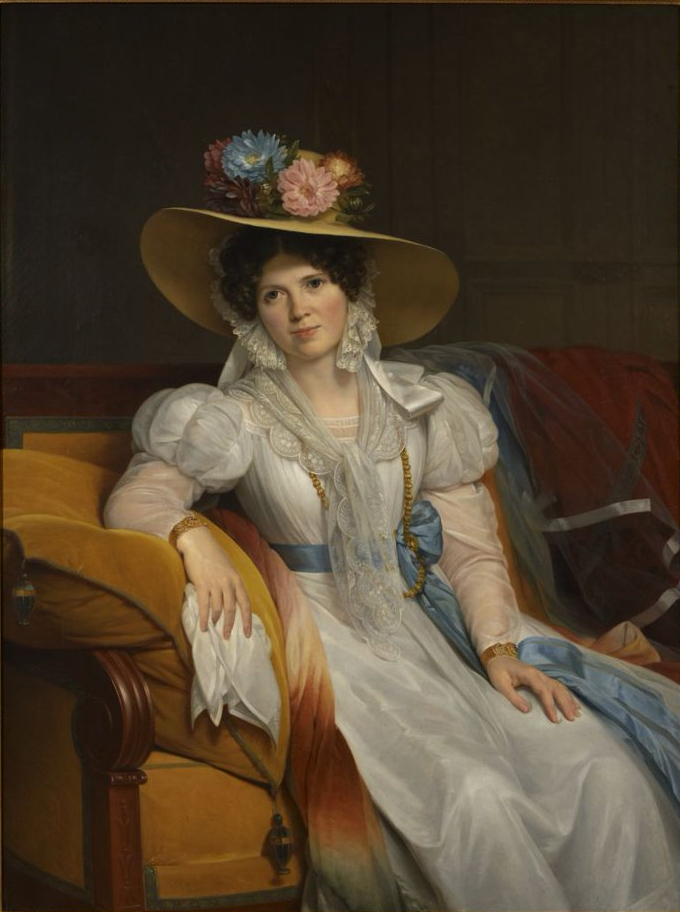
Madame Perier by Louis Hersent (1831), Musée de la Révolution française.

Casimir Perier's wide-ranging business interests and investments help to explain his opposition in the Chamber of Deputies to financial policies of Restoration ministries. In 1817, he opposed the policy of the Richelieu ministry for raising loans to pay the war indemnity demanded by the allied coalition after Napoleon's final defeat. In the 1820s, he was a leader in debates (1821–1822) against the policies of the Villèle ministry for financing canal construction and (1824–1825) for indemnifying the nobility for lands confiscated during the Revolution.

Perier entered the Chamber of Deputies for Paris in 1817, taking his seat in the Left Centre with the moderate opposition, and making his first speech in defense of the freedom of the press. Re-elected for Paris in 1822 and 1824, and in 1827 for Paris and for Troyes, he elected to represent Troyes (Department of Aube), and sat for that constituency until his death. Perier's violence in debate was not associated with any disloyalty to the Bourbon Restoration, and he held resolutely aloof from the Republican conspiracies and intrigues which prepared the way for the revolution of 1830. Under the Martignac ministry, there was some prospect of a reconciliation with the court, and, in January 1829, he was nominated a candidate for the presidency of the chamber; but in August with the elevation to power of Jules, Prince de Polignac, the truce ceased, and on 15 March 1830, Perier was one of the 221 deputies who repudiated the Ordinances put forward by Charles X.

Averse by instinct and by interest to popular revolution, Perier nevertheless sat on the provisory commission of five at the Hôtel de Ville during the Three Glorious Days of July 1830, but he refused to sign the declaration of Charles X's dethronement. Perier reluctantly recognized in the government of Louis Philippe's constitutional monarchy the only alternative to the continuance of the Revolution, but he was no favorite with the new king, whom he scorned for his trucking with the Paris 'mob'. He became President of the Chamber of Deputies, and sat for a few months in the cabinet, though without a portfolio.

=== President of the Council ===
During the first years of the July Monarchy of Louis Philippe, following the fall of the weak and discredited ministry of Jacques Laffitte, Perier, who had drifted more and more to the Right, was summoned to power (13 March 1831), and, in the short space of a year, he more or less restored civic order in France and re-established her credit in Europe. Paris was in a constant state of disturbance from March to September, and was only held in check by the premier's determination. The Canut Revolt at Lyon was suppressed after hard fighting; and at Grenoble, in face of the quarrels between the military and the inhabitants, Perier declined to make any concession to the townsfolk. For Perier, the Revolution of 1830 was not the beginning of greater things to come, it was the end of the Revolution of 1789. As he said to Odilon Barrot of Laffitte's "Party of Movement": "No, Monsieur, there has not been a revolution, only a change in the head of state."

As a minister, Perier refused to be dragged into armed intervention in favor of the revolutionary government of Warsaw, but his policy of peace did not exclude energetic demonstrations in support of French interests. He constituted France the protector of Belgium by the prompt expedition of the army of the north against the Dutch in August 1831. French influence in Italy was asserted by the audacious occupation of Ancona (23 February 1832); and the refusal of compensation for injuries to French residents by the Portuguese government was followed by a naval demonstration at Lisbon.

Perier had undertaken the premiership with many forebodings, and overwork and anxiety prepared the way for disease. In the spring of 1832, during the cholera outbreak in Paris, he visited the hospitals in company with Prince Ferdinand Philippe, Duke of Orléans. He fell ill the next day of a violent fever, and died six weeks later.

== Private life ==
Casimir Perier married (13 October 1805) Marie Cécile Laurence Loyer, nicknamed "Pauline", the daughter of Laurent-Pouthus Loyer, an old regime magistrate of Lyon who was a victim of the Terror during the Revolution. There were two sons: Auguste Casimir-Perier (1811–1876), deputy for Seine and Aube, and Charles-Paul Perier (1812–1897), deputy and senator for Seine-Inférieur. Auguste-Casimir's son, Jean Casimir-Perier (1847–1907), was elected President of the Third Republic in 1894.

== Notes ==
Preceded by Jacques Laffitte	Prime Minister of France; 1831–1832	Succeeded by Duc de Dalmatie
Preceded by Comte de Montalivet	French Minister of the Interior; 1831–1832	Succeeded by Comte de Montalivet
