= Teisseire (company) =

French soft drinks manufacturer

- Company type: Société par actions simplifiée
- Industry: Beverage
- Founded: 1720 in Grenoble, France
- Founder: Mathieu Teisseire
- Headquarters: 482 Avenue Ambroise Croizat, Crolles, France
- Products: Flavoured syrups, fruit juices
- Parent: Britvic plc
- Subsidiaries: Moulin de Valdonne
- Website: teisseire.com

Teisseire is a French manufacturer and brand of flavoured syrups. Although primarily used for creating soft drinks when diluted with water, they are also used in making cocktails and flavoured coffee. The company was founded in Grenoble in 1720 by Mathieu Teisseire and remained in his immediate family until the mid-19th century. After François Reynaud purchased the company in 1907, it was run by four generations of the Reynaud family until 2004 when it was acquired by Fruité Entreprises. Since 2010 the company has been owned by the British soft drinks manufacturer and distributor Britvic. Teisseire's main manufacturing plant is situated in Crolles near Grenoble. Although the company's products are now exclusively non-alcoholic, it was originally famous for its cherry liqueur, Ratafia de Teisseire, which was manufactured well into the 20th century.

== History ==
The company was founded in Grenoble by Mathieu Teisseire in 1720. The Teisseire district in the city is named after the family. A distiller by trade, Teisseire originally manufactured vinegars and Ratafia de Teisseire, a type of cherry liqueur which he had invented and which made his family's fortune. The 18th-century Venetian adventurer Giacomo Casanova was particularly fond of Teisseire's ratafia and described it in his memoirs, Histoire de ma vie, as "the divine liqueur of Grenoble". He went on to write: "This excellent liqueur is composed of cherry juice, eau de vie, sugar, and cinnamon, and it would be impossible for the nectar of the gods on Olympus to surpass it in delicacy."

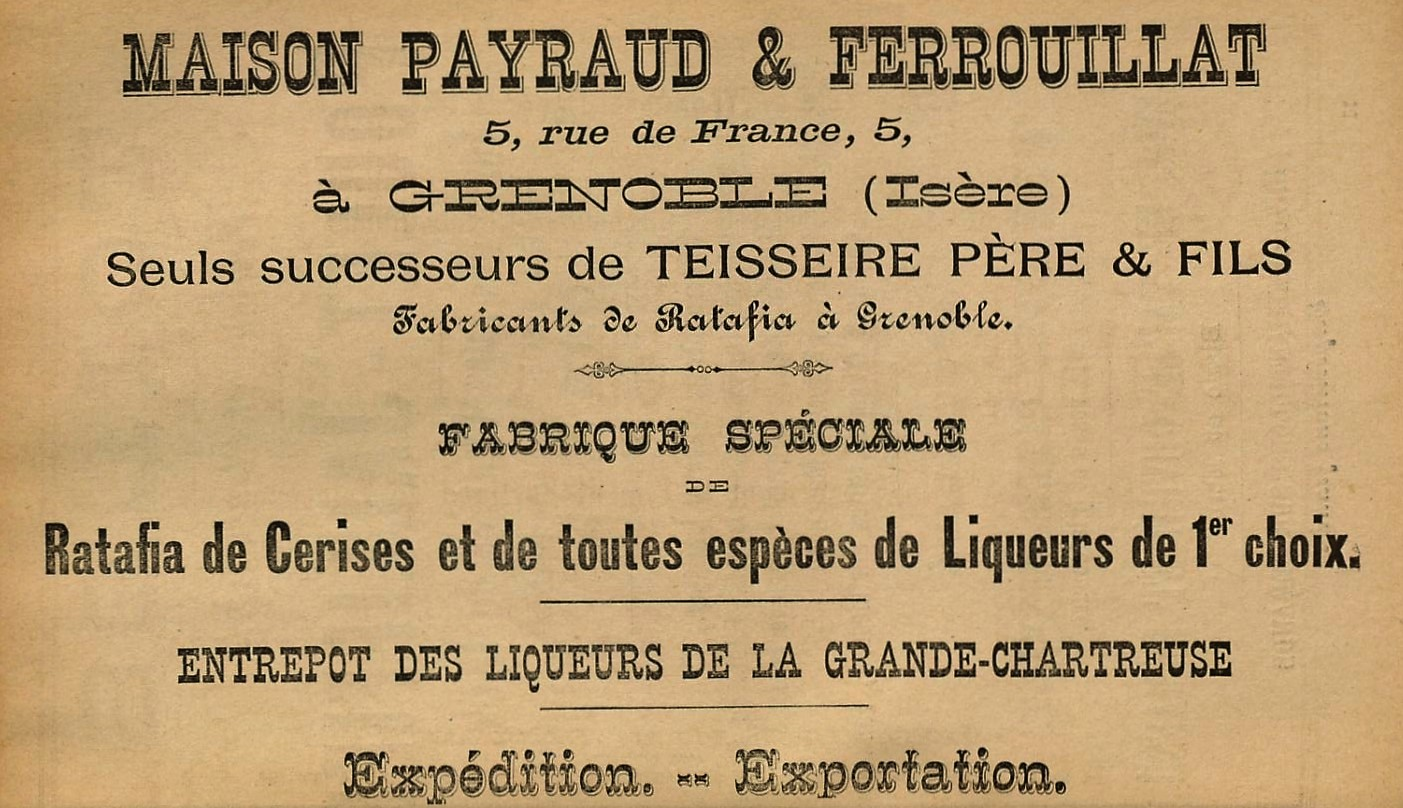
1883 advertisement for Payraud & Ferrouillat describing them as the sole successors of Teisseire, Père & Fils

The Teisseire business, which was located at Place Grenette in Grenoble, then passed to Mathieu's son, Mathieu II. With the death of Mathieu II in 1781, it was run by his widow and younger son Camille Teisseire whom he had named as his principal heir. For some time after Mathieu II's death, the company was known as Veuve Teisseire & Fils (The Widow Teisseire and Son). In addition to running the family business, Camille Teisseire was an active politician, serving on the Grenoble city council during the French Revolution and later as the Deputy for Isère in the French Parliament. The family further increased its wealth and diversified its holdings when it formed an alliance with the Perier family through Camille's marriage to the daughter of Claude Perier. When Camille Teisseire took up his seat in the French Chamber of Deputies in 1820, he turned the management of the distilling business over to his eldest son Charles, and the company became known as Teisseire, Père & Fils (Teisseire, Father & Son). At that time in addition to their Ratafia de Teisseire, the firm was producing 5 other liqueurs, 19 varieties of eau-de-vie, 8 varieties of wine and spirits, and 24 varieties of crème alcoolisée (a type of liqueur with an elevated sugar content).

By the second half of the 19th century, the company was being run by the Grenoble distillers Payraud & Ferrouillat who were relatives of the Teisseire family. They advertised themselves as the "sole successors" of Teisseire, Père & Fils and warned customers to beware of imitations of the famous Ratafia de Teisseire. In 1907 the Teisseire brand and distillery were purchased by François Reynaud, an absinthe distiller and merchant in Grenoble who began adding fruit syrups to the range. After his death in 1927, his two sons increased the variety of non-alcoholic fruit syrups and gradually moved out of the distillery business. In 1957, Reynaud's grandson (also called François) introduced a concentrated form of the syrups packaged in aluminium tubes which allowed the product to be distributed more widely. The distribution range was further widened in 1959 when the company launched a lightweight and unbreakable aluminium bottle modelled after the bidon used by French cyclists to hold drinking water. Teisseire would later have an official involvement with the Tour de France cycling race when it began participating in the race's advertising caravans in 2009. The company's manufacturing base was moved out of Grenoble in 1971 to a new purpose-built factory in nearby Crolles. In 1993 Teisseire acquired the fruit juice and fruit syrup manufacturing company Moulin de Valdonne and continues to market a range of juices and syrups under the Moulin de Valdonne brand.

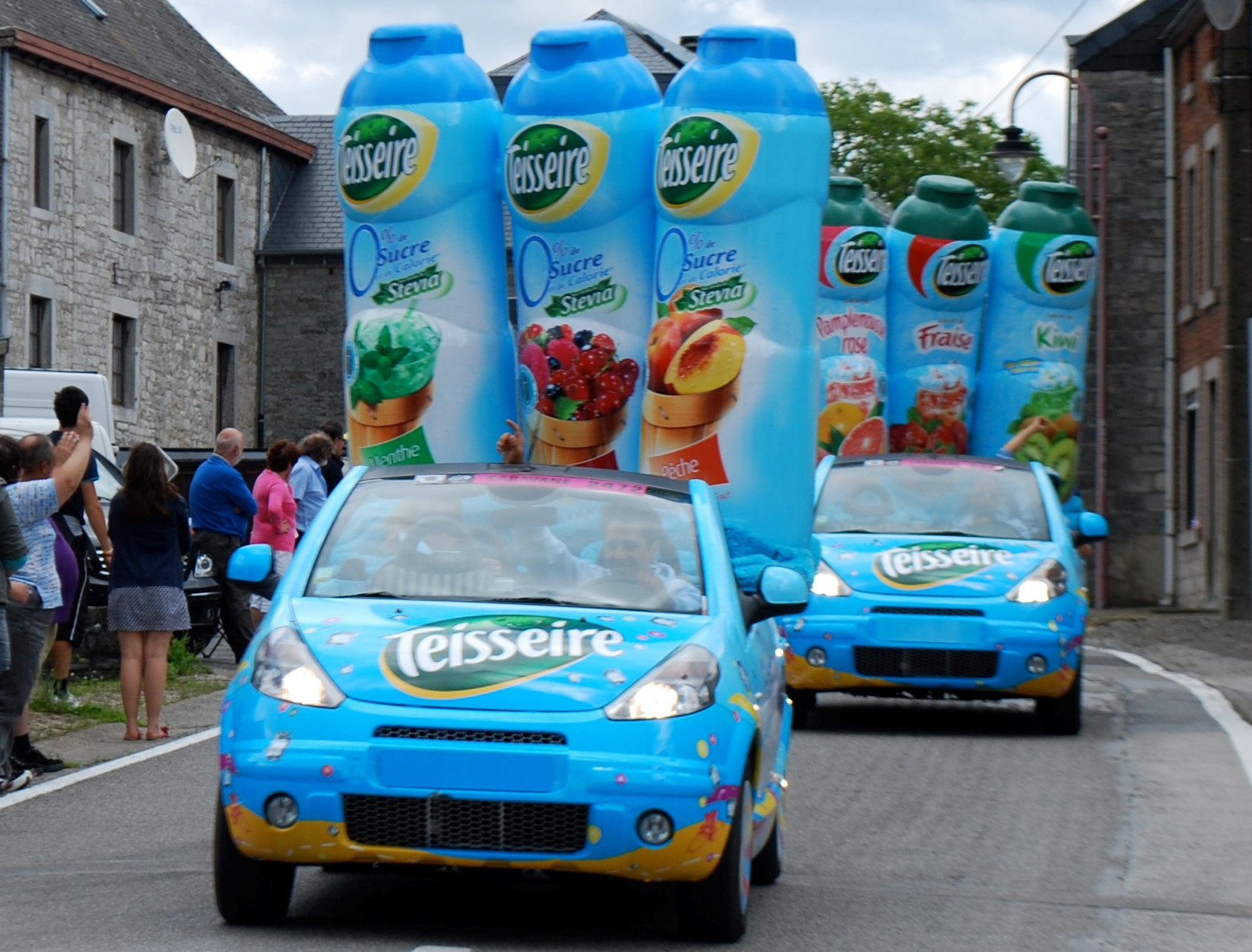
The Teisseire caravan passing near Durbuy in the 2012 Tour de France

== Modern company ==
Disagreements between Dominque Reynaud and his younger brother Eric over the running of the company and its subsidiaries began in 2001 and led to a full-blown family feud characterized in the French press as "Dallas-sur-Isère" (a reference to the plot of the American television series Dallas). The dispute was settled in 2003 with a restructuring of the family's shares in its holding company Cofidi and Eric Reynaud taking over the leadership of Teisseire. However, four generations of Reynaud family ownership came to an end the following year when Fruité Entreprises took a majority share in Teisseire. A 0% sugar version of some of Teisseire's most popular syrups was launched in 2007 further increasing their share of the soft drink market in France, and by 2012 the company was producing over 70 flavours of syrup.

In 2010 Teisseire and its owner Fruité Entreprises were acquired by the British soft drinks manufacturer and distributor Britvic. The following year Britvic's Fruit Shoot drink (marketed in the UK under the Robinsons brand) was launched in France under the Teisseire brand. By 2013 Teisseire's sales had exceeded €200 million and its net income had risen 27% from its 2009 level to €11 million. Its products are sold throughout the world, although its main market remains France where combined with its subsidiary, Moulin de Valdonne, it had a 43% share of the soft drink market in 2014.
