= Hospital General of Grenoble =

16th-century hospital in Grenoble, France

The Hospital General of Grenoble was established in the late 16th century in Grenoble, France as a house of confinement and relief for paupers, beggars, the diseased, etc. The Hospital was composed of various buildings that served several purposes including housing the inmates.

== Establishment ==
Following multiple plagues and famines that took over the city in the late 16th century, in 1619, Lesdiguières proposed turning the old Hospital Notre Dame into a house of confinement for the poor. This was tried but in 1620, the hospital turned out to be too small to encompass all of the paupers of the city and the Grenoblois did not want to bare the cost of increasing its size.

After the death of Lesdiguières, his son-in-law and heir, Duke of Crequi, arranged a meeting with a few magistrates and proposed to establish the Hospital General (1620). He donated some of his lands and the amount was matched by the government.

=== Groundplan ===
According to plan, the facility was to consist of four buildings forming a square. The wings were to contain sleeping quarters for men and women. Facilities such as kitchens and laundries were placed nearby, with the chapel and sacristy where the priests would live, along with the nuns, orphaned children, and all other employees of the Hospital on the forth side.

=== Cost ===
As the cost of construction was very high to be born by the city, the Hospital found itself almost fully funded by donations. The Duc de Crequi made the very first donation although, the magistrates dominate the list of donators.

Donator	Amount (in Livres)
Duke de Crequi	1,500
Clergy	1,000
Nobility	6,000
Chambre des Comptes	6,000
Parlament	equivalent sum

=== Groundbreaking ===
The groundbreaking of the hospital in 1627, was attended by mostly judges. The magistrates had since let the Bishop of Grenoble play a small role in the founding of the Hospital. but in 1635, his position became a permanent seat on the governing board of the Hospital. In the 16th century, the main idea of the hospital had been the relief of the poor. But as the Counter Reformation began to find its way into the city, the Hospital's founders spoke of how "The Charity of men and women of Grenoble has built this Hospital to care for the bodies and souls... of the poor."

=== The first inmates ===
On July 17, 1638, twenty-four noble women walked in hand with twelve orphans through the streets of the city and to the Hospital. There, they held a special mass and the women took the children to a section of the Hospital which would, from that day forward, be named the Orphans hospice. Then two years later, the Madeline hospice opened: an asylum for prostitutes in regret. In the years to come, many new hospices would be created within the hospital.

== The hospital's first problems ==
While the hospital helped inmates within the facility such as the Madelines and the Orphans, a different group of benefactors silently worked their way into the rest of the city. This group was a branch of the secret society, the Company of the Holy Sacrament. Born in 1627, it aimed to confine all of the poor and cease begging in the city. The Grenoble Brothers discussed this plan to rid the city of begging and cone the poor, and they were well aware of the things stopping them from doing so.

The Hospital General, for one, had never been completed and was unorganized in almost every way. The administration was failing and those in charge did not want anyone proposing any ideas for fear that they might lose their positions. And most importantly, most of their funds were gone.

The Company began to slowly infiltrate the Hospital's governing board and by 1651, five of the seven directors of the Hospital also happened to be members of The Company. The Hospital was just one of the many institutions that the Company gained control over at this time. But even in control, they could not find enough funds to confine all of the poor in the city. As a solution, a tax was imposed on any animal brought into the city for slaughter, and with much persuasion in 1662 the city gave the revenues from that tax over to the hospital.

== Relief in the city ==
=== Age of Transition ===
On August 25, 1712, paupers of the city all dined together, then marched, single file, to the Hospital General, where they changed from their rags to new clothes. This exchange symbolized the paupers transforming from free people to inmates of the Hospital. This event also symbolized the success of the hospital finally confining the poor.

There were many new projects that the Hospital took on in the 1680s and 1690s. This included separating a section of the hospital specifically for the incurably sick, as well as a place for diseased prostitutes, and of course enlarging and completing the part of the building that had never been completed. Completing the Hospital was a challenge considering that the city itself was going through some economic issues and the number of paupers in the city continued to rise. Meaning that the Hospital had to spend all its revenues in food and other necessities to care for all of those inmates. But finally, in 1726 the directors were able to finish the building and complete the vision that the original founders had when creating the Hospital. This upgrade was assisted by alms and charitable donations. Unfortunately, the Hospital did not keep a steady record of the donations.

=== Illegitimate children ===
Illegitimacy continued to raise, in between 1680–1689, 179 bastards were baptized. But by 1735 the Hospital found itself caring for 850 children, and in over 20,000 livres of debt because of all these infants.

== Beggars and paupers ==
Between the years of 1724 and 1735, the Hospital kept a record of the paupers incarcerated in the facility. The information kept included name, origin, age, physical description, and sometimes the profession. At that time, the hospital had incarcerated 708 mendicants, which was considered a very large number.

The directors, in taking note of the origin of the paupers, realized that many were not originally from Grenoble. In fact, in 1724 most were strangers, and 26.7 percent were of Grenoble origin. In 1730, that percentage dropped to 12 percent, and about 14 percent were coming from very distant areas such as Spain or Italy.

=== About the beggars ===
Most of the inmates were males (33 percent were women), and every age range was present in the Hospital. 30 percent were from ages 0–20 years old, 30 percent were 21-45, and 40 percent were 45 years or older. The most common beggars were either very old, very young, or consisted of families. One-third of adult men were sick or impaired in some way.

These impaired were not able to work to support themselves, and young children found themselves in the same situation. Very few had skills, the Hospital had seen weavers, merchants, a surgeon, and even priests, but the largest section had no skills. This showed that some of the beggars, were not truly beggars, they were poor that had fallen victims to economic issues such as unemployment. The line of distinction between the poor and the wandering beggar became unclear and the directors did not know who they should treat with the compassion which they previously reserved for the "deserving poor".

=== Bread distribution ===
Between the years of 1712 and 1722, the distribution of bread greatly increased and therefore had to be systematized. In these years the directors kept the record of the name, profession, birth date and place, occupation, illness, and the number of dependents for every poor person receiving bread from the Hospital. The directors' indiscretion led to very detailed reports of each pauper and their situation. The directors would enter their homes, inspect the furniture, and question everyone in the household about their habits. Thanks to this, there is an abundance of information during this time period, about the poor, and their living conditions. Of course, the document was written from the eyes of the directors and who they decided who was or was not worthy of aid.

==== Some of the listed beggars ====
- 1712 - Ennemond Molard (49 year old glove maker) lived with his wife and six children ranging from nine months to 18 years old. They all lived in one room with one bed. The wife and two eldest daughters fell sick when the family began to need assistance. In 1719 The wife returned the bread card because two of her children died and they no longer needed assistance.
- Marguerite Camasault- Wife of a schoolmaster, who at 8 months pregnant, went to search for her husband.
- Catherine La Rue- Seduced by a soldier, and abandoned, cursed to a life of begging with her infant.
- Jean Blanc- 30-year-old native of La Mure. A hod carrier until he dislocated his arm and could not work anymore.
- Marie Sybille- 30-year-old glove seamstress, abandoned by her husband with a five-month-old infant. One year later, the directors found that Marie had delivered another child 7 months after her husband's disappearance.

=== Comparing Inmates and Bread Recipients ===
There were many visible differences between the inmates of the Hospital General and the paupers who received bread. The most obvious is that most recipients of bread were in their prime years of age, unlike the majority percentage of elderly in the Hospital. The inmates in the hospital usually had illnesses consisting of birth defects or "mysterious humors". Meanwhile, the recipients of bread usually had illnesses or injuries related to their places of labor. Men usually had ambulations or broken limbs, while women commonly had bad eyesight and lung disease.

Usually, what would cause a man to ask for the aid of the Hospital would be a sort of illness, injury, bad harvests or other personal issues that would lower that family's income for the time being. Take Georges Giraud for example, he was a 46-year-old flax weaver, and in the span of a month he lost an arm and had his supplies stolen from him. Although he was a respectable laborer, he found himself in need of the bread distributed by the hospital until he could get back on his feet. And a few years later he was back at work with five machines and a number of employees.

== Late 18th century ==
In the later years of the 18th century, the hospital had not seen much of a change. Services provided still consisted of food, shelter, and medical care for the poor. Even the buildings themselves had not been drastically altered in any way. But the Hospital had found itself once again with many financial issues, and not able to maintain all of its dependents or even the building itself which was starting to fall in pieces. The Hospital's directors tried to maintain order even with all the difficulties the facility was going through. But less and less of them were showing up to their weekly meetings and by the 1770s they abandoned the Hospital and it was passed to a new group of men.

=== New directors ===
The new group of directors were men well versed in finances and the marketplace. Among them were Director Barthelon, a merchant and head of Barthelon; Monsieur Bottut, member of the consortium that owned Rives iron foundries; Director Bovier, lawyer and glove merchant; and Director Prat, owner of a stocking factory with over 70 workers. The wealthiest of the directors was Claude Perier, known as Perier-Milord owner of a cloth enterprise, and a wallpaper factory at his castle in Vizille. Along with Claude were some of his business associates.

==== New rules and goals ====
The new directors wanted to rebuild the Hospital, which was so old and humid that it was causing more illnesses than which were actually being cured inside. They attempted to raise money in 1782 but the funds were insufficient.

The directors were also seeing issues with the demoiselles, women who handled the poor and maintained the hospital. These employees would either not care for the inmates, or favor specific inmates too much. In 1761 the directors placed a set of rules for the demoiselles but they were not followed. In 1781 they set new regulations and this time they appointed a superior, who would punish the other young ladies if they neglected the inmates or spent too long outside of the hospital running errands.

==== Health in the hospital ====
By 1781, there was a great decline in the number of inmates that contracted disease in the hospital, and 75 percent of the patients would stay less than one year (21 percent less than a month). The Hospital General was literally becoming a hospital, and the directors hired a surgeon to assist the doctors already employed by the facility.

==== Changes in the bread distribution ====
The Directors believed that distributing so much bread was wasteful, and in 1769, they removed almost 40 percent of recipients from the list. They began to give bread only to those in extremely desperate need and did not consider un-employment or low wages an excuse. A person's bread card would be removed if they:

- Had children over the age of 10, because they were old enough to work and provide income.
- Were rude or immoral. (Denis Rosset, a carriage maker, would beat his wife. His bread card was removed, he was separated from his wife, and they continued to assist her.)
- Had a distant relative who could possibly assist you.
- Recovered from illness or injury

In the past, the directors would hold weekly meetings where paupers could come and explain why they were in need of aid from the Hospital. This new administration did not favor meeting in person with these paupers. Because of this, they began to ask the poor to send in written petitions, explaining why they needed a bread card. This ended up making it more difficult to judge paupers, because they would all write the same sort of letters, begging and praising the directors (often mentioning that they prayed for all the directors' health). And the majority of the poor, who were illiterate would simply hire someone to write their petition, causing the directors to have an influx of letters that were almost identical.

In short, the hospital which was once a place for every beggar of the city, now only cared for the sick. And the bread distribution, meant for all of the paupers, was now reserved mainly for the women and elderly who truly needed it. The directors did not care about the "War against Begging" which was the foundation of the hospital when it was first established. The directors began to slowly ignore the majority of the poor, leaving that task to the king and his courts.
