= Claude Perier =

French banker and merchant

Claude-Nicolas Perier
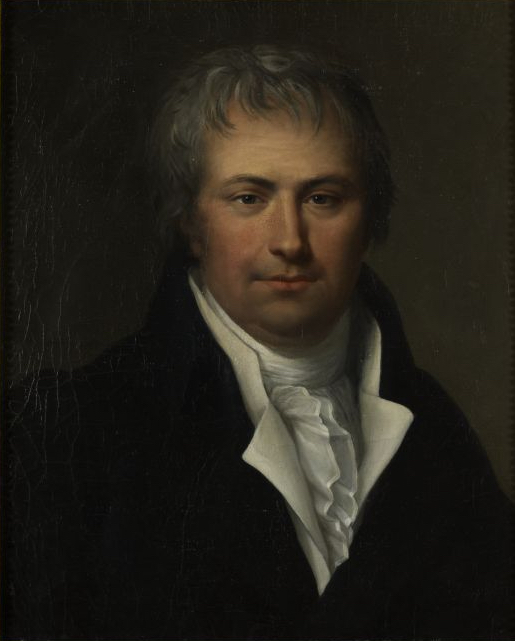
- Portrait of Claude Perier by Jean-Baptiste-François Desoria, Museum of the French Revolution, Vizille

Personal details
- Born: 28 May 1742 Grenoble, France
- Died: 6 February 1801 (aged 58) Paris
- Spouse: Marie-Charlotte Pascal (m. 1767–1801)
- Children: Jacques-Prosper; Elisabeth-Josephine; Euphrosine-Marie; Augustin-Charles; Alexander-Jacques; Antoine-Scipion; Casimir-Pierre; Adelaide-Hélène; Camille-Joseph; Alphonse; Amédée-Auguste; André-Jean-Joseph
- Profession: Banker, merchant

Claude-Nicolas Perier (28 May 1742 – 6 February 1801) was assured an important place in French history when he opened his Château de Vizille near Grenoble to the famous meeting of the estates of the province of Dauphiné (21 July 1788) heralding the coming of the French Revolution. He is notable also as the founder of the remarkable Perier family "bourgeois dynasty" that rose to economic and political influence and prominence in France during the 19th century. Claude's descendants became leading Paris bankers, regents of the Bank of France and owner-directors of Anzin, the major coal mining company of France in the Department of Nord. They were mayors of towns, prefects of departments and members of municipal tribunals and chambers of commerce. Many were elected representatives of departments to the Chamber of Deputies in Paris and appointed to France's Chamber of Peers. Most notably, Casimir Pierre Perier (1777–1832), the fourth of Claude's eight sons, became Prime Minister of France in 1831–32 during the Orleanist monarchy of Louis-Philippe I. Casimir's grandson, Jean Casimir-Perier (1847–1907), was elected president of the Third Republic in 1894. Claude Perier was sufficiently wealthy before 1789 to be known as "Perier-Milord" in Grenoble and surroundings, but it was mainly during the decade of revolution 1789–99 that he created the financial underpinning of the Perier dynasty. His eight sons and two daughters would share his legacy of around 5,800,000 francs.

== Children of Claude Perier ==
Jacques-Prosper (1768) Died at birth

Elisabeth-Josephine (1770–1850) m. Jacques-Fortunat Savoye de Rollin; Member of the Tribunat; Deputy (Isère); Prefect (Eure, Seine-Maritime, Deux-Nèthes, Côte-d'Or); Legion of Honor

Euphrosine-Marie (1771–1779) Died young

Augustin-Charles (1773–1833) m. Henriette de Berkheim. École Polytechnique; Banker, Manufacturer (Grenoble/Vizille); Deputy (Isère); Peer of France; Legion of Honor

Alexander-Jacques (1774–1846) Manufacturer and mayor, Montargis; Deputy (Loiret); Legion of Honor

Antoine-Scipion (1776–1821) m. Louise de Dietrich. Perier Bank (Paris); Regent Bank of France; Anzin owner-director; Chaillot machine shops, Paris Chamber of Commerce

Casimir-Pierre (1777–1832) m. Pauline Loyer. Perier Bank (Paris); Regent Bank of France; Anzin owner-director; Chaillot machine shops; Paris Chamber of Commerce; Deputy (Seine, Aube); Prime Minister; Legion of Honor

Adelaide-Hélène (Marine) 1779–1851) m. Camille Teisseire (Sub-Prefect, Ardèche; Deputy, Isère; Legion of Honor)

Camille-Joseph (1781–1844) m. Pelagie Lecouteulx de Canteleu. École Polytechnique; Auditor Conseil d'État; Mayor (Chatou); Prefect (Corrèze, Meuse); Deputy (Corrèze, Sarthe); Peer of France; Legion of Honor

Alphonse (1782–1866) m. Antoinette-Bonne de Tournadre. École Polytechnique; Manufacturer, Banker, Tribunal of Commerce (Grenoble/Vizille); Mayor (Eybens); Deputy (Isère); Auditor Conseil d'État, Legion of Honor

Amédée-Auguste (1785–1851) Auditor Conseil d'État

André-Jean-Joseph (1786–1868) m. Marie-Aglae Clavel de Kergonan. Perier Bank (Paris); regent Bank of France; Anzin owner-director; Deputy (Marne); Legion of Honor

== Claude Perier at Grenoble and Vizille before 1789 ==
=== Early life ===
Grenoble, the capital city of the Province of Dauphiny in southeastern France, was where the Periers began their rise to prominence. Claude's father, Jacques Perier (1702–1782), moved there about 1720 from the hamlet of Perier, located near the small town of Mens some 50 kilometers south of Grenoble. He was an aspiring merchant of linen and canvas cloth, and Grenoble at the time was becoming a main commercial center with links to important markets at Arles, Avignon, Lyons, Marseilles and the great annual fair at Beaucaire. He prospered at Grenoble and in 1741 married Marie Dupuy, the daughter of a merchant and one-time municipal consul. Claude Perier, born in 1742, was the first of their seven children. In 1749, Jacques purchased an imposing, multi-story home for the family on the Grande Rue.

=== Business career ===
Jacques' business developed as a family affair over the years. His daughter Elisabeth, for example, married Pierre Jordan, a wealthy merchant in Lyon. Commerce with Voiron near Grenoble was added by François Perier-Lagrange, who was a nephew. In 1764, Madeleine Perier, a niece, married a leading merchant in Voiron, François Tivolier. Claude Perier cemented these connections when he came of age by marrying Marie-Charlotte Pascal (1749–1821), the daughter of a leading Voiron merchant. Her dowry in 1767 amounted to 60,000 livres. By that date Claude was already an active member of the family enterprise. In 1764 the business was named "Jacques Perier, Father, Son, Nephew & Company." Claude Perier and Perier-Lagrange were the minor partners. When this association was renewed in 1773, the shares of Jacques and his son, Claude, were 344,266 livres and 72,493 livres, respectively.

The trade in linens was a mainstay, but the Periers also acted as credit bankers for area businesses, made land investments, and ventured into manufacturing at Grenoble on their own account (muslins, 1777; hardware, 1779). Most importantly, Claude and his father responded to the increasing demand in France for printed cotton cloths (toiles peints) and wallpapers (papiers peints). Printed cottons were mainly imported from India and were known as indiennes, but they began to be fabricated in France in 1760 by the famous industrialist Christophe-Philippe Oberkampf (1738–1815). His factory for cotton prints at Jouy near Paris, which employed 900 workers by 1774, was named a "royal manufacturer" in 1783 by Louis XVI. Oberkampf invented the first machine for printing wallpaper in 1785. Jacques and Claude Perier began the production of these printed stuffs in 1775–1777 at Vizille, a small village just south of Grenoble.

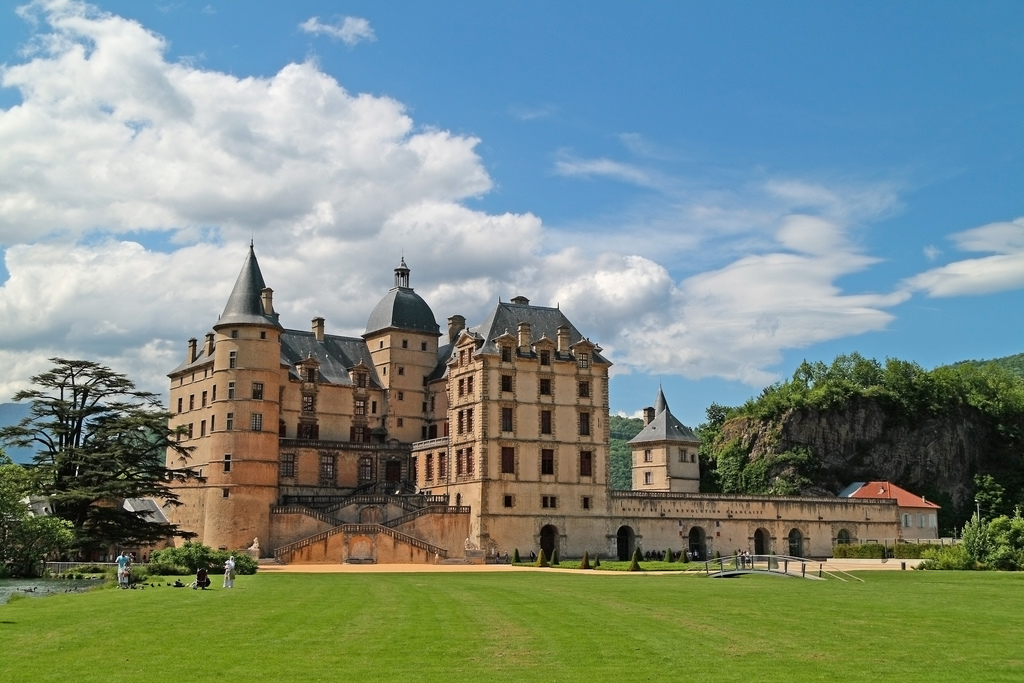
Chateau de Vizille

==== Purchase of the Château de Vizille ====
Famously, Claude purchased the historic 17th century Château de Vizille with its large rooms and spacious main hall, extensive grounds, numerous out-buildings, streams and water park, as well as nearby lands in Oisans and La Mure. All told, here were ideal conditions for the manufacture of indiennes. Claude paid Gabriel Louis de Neufville, duc de Villeroy, approximately 1,254,000 livres for the buildings and properties. By 1785, about 100 workers (400 by 1789) were employed at the château producing printed cottons.

As became typical of his business style, Claude Perier was involved in other money-making projects even as production of printed cottons at the Vizille factory began to get underway. In fact, the factory was rented out to Swiss experts from Geneva, Jean-Louis Fazy and his son, who ran the operation until January, 1794, at which time other specialists from Geneva and Mulhouse were brought in. Only beginning in 1798 would Claude's eldest son, Augustin-Charles, assume direction of the family enterprise.

==== Cane sugar investments ====
Meantime, in 1782, Jacques Perier died leaving a fortune of 600,000 livres to be divided among his three sons, Claude, Jacques-Augustin and Antoine. As the eldest son, Claude's share of the estate was 400,000 livres. These were funds that helped Claude establish a new commercial house at Voiron in 1783. The purpose was to make money importing cane sugar from the Caribbean. The business was called "Perier, Father and Son, Berlioz, Rey & Company." Berlioz and Joseph Rey, who were business associates at Grenoble, each invested 48,000 livres (4 shares) in the company; Claude also invested 48,000 livres, plus 240,000 as working capital; and one share (12,000 livres) was listed in the name of Augustin Perier, Claude's then 10-year-old son. In 1784 Claude took a half-interest in another sugar import company at Marseilles, "Pierre Chazel & Company." These companies were very profitable until 1793.

==== Involvement in Hospital General ====
In the 1770s the directors in charge of the Hospital General of Grenoble (a facility meant to incarcerate paupers and beggars) abandoned the hospital. A group of new men became the directors and among them was Claude. In fact, out of all the directors, Claude Perier was the wealthiest. Claude was wealthy and powerful enough to bring along his business associates onto the board of directors for the Hospital as well: Monsieur Dupy, Monsieur Pascal, and his cousin Périer-Lagrange.

== Claude Perier from Grenoble/Vizille to Paris, 1789–1801 ==
=== Involvement in the French Revolution ===
Claude Perier played an important role in the onset of the French Revolution by supporting resistance in Grenoble (Assembly of Vizille) by the Parlement of Dauphiny against the centralizing and fiscal abuses of the monarchy of Louis XVI. His eldest son Augustin would write later: "His travels in England had given him a proper idea of the benefits of a free government. Associating himself readily with all the opinions and all of the hopes of that period, he made hurriedly all the preparations necessary for such a large gathering, and his eagerness, which was not without danger, was worthy of the tokens of public gratitude." Almost 500 persons gathered at the Château de Vizille (21 July 1788) where Claude provided a large banquet for the deputies of the province. Mostly, although also with popular support, it was an assemblage of well-to-do "notables": churchmen, landed nobility, lawyers, notaries, municipal officials, businessmen and doctors. Their famous demand was for the convocation in Paris of an Estates-General wherein the Third Estate would have double-representation and votes would be by head rather than by order. Thus was precipitated a revolutionary movement in France more inclusive, complex and disruptive than anyone could have anticipated.

Claude Perier dealt opportunistically with the escalating political postures of France's decade of revolution, 1789-99. He became a valuable member of the new municipal council of Grenoble, but did not aspire to political leadership or fame. He remained at heart and acted basically as a merchant-banker and inveterate "money-manager" (manieur d'argent).

He kept abreast of opportunity in matters of investment and enterprise. Early on (1789–90), when it was considered patriotic, he purchased nationalized properties of the church and emigrated nobles, paying in assignats, the paper money issued by the National Assembly in Paris. In 1790, he acquired a mechanized cotton-spinning factory at Anilly, near Montargis. In 1791, he invested heavily in a sugar refining company in Marseilles, "Seren & Company."

In 1793, when France was at war and Jacobins of the National Convention held sway in Paris (Marie Antoinette was guillotined on October 31, 1793), he organized a company to manufacture rifles for the French Army in Savoy; and with the chemist-geologist Alexandre Giroud, he petitioned Paris for permission to establish the production of commercial soda at the cantons of Vizille and La Mure near Grenoble. These initiatives enhanced his reputation as a patriot and good citizen (bon citoyen) at an opportune time, for in October 1793 Claude found himself denounced as an enemy of the Revolution by Pierre Chépy, who was president of Grenoble's Société Populaire. He was accused of cupidity, for liquidating his sugar importing company (Perier, Berlioz & Rey) by paying investors in depreciated assignats, and more seriously, of supporting an anti-Jacobin revolt in southern France at Lyons. There was some substance to these charges - Claude Perier's opportunism was not always circumspect. But ultimately, his 'indiscretions' came to be excused, probably most importantly because he had befriended Camille Teisseire, a very popular Jacobin member of Grenoble's municipal council and the city's chief of police. In 1794, Teisseire married Marine Perier, Claude's youngest daughter.

=== Claude Perier in Paris ===
When the Thermidorian Reaction cooled down revolutionary fervor in France, Claude shifted his business activity to Paris, where he took up residence (28 November 1794) at No.341-43 rue Saint-Honoré. His eldest son, Augustin, was primed to take over family affairs at Grenoble/Vizille. In Paris, Claude made contacts with leading merchant-manufacturers and money-managers, such as Jean Lecouteulx de Canteleu, William Sabatier, Médard Desprez and Jean-Frédéric Perregaux, and also the noted legal advisor, Pierre-Nicolas Berryer. His first financial coup came in 1795 when he participated in a major loan of 2,418,505 livres to the owners of the Anzin Coal Company in the department of Nord. The loan allowed the company to buy back shares in the enterprise that had been nationalized/confiscated by the government of the Convention. Claude's investment in the loan was 393,425 livres, payable in assignats. In return, he received a large number of the company's coveted shares and (in 1798) a directorship. Anzin would be a major client of the Paris bank founded in 1801 by two of Claude's sons, Casimir and Scipion.

Claude Perier's most notable achievement as a money-manager came in 1799–1800 when he was a founder and became one of the first regents of the Bank of France. Claude had associated in 1796 with a group of twenty or so bankers and businessmen to establish a private bank called the Caisse des Comptes Courants. This bank, with offices in Paris on the Place des Victoires, was capitalized modestly at 5 million francs and specialized in short-term business loans at 6 per cent interest, but the group aspired to grow the capital base and expand into long-term investments and government finance. In brief, these were the financiers who, shortly after the coup d'état of 18 Brumaire (November 9, 1799) established the government of the Consulate, met with the new First Consul, Napoleon Bonaparte, and convinced him to enlarge and transform the Caisse des Comptes Courants into the Bank of France, to be capitalized at 30 million francs. They agreed to loan the new government 12 million francs to get the bank started. Claude Perier, aided by the lawyer Berryer, drafted the statutes of the bank. He was appointed as one of its first fifteen regents. Subsequently, he was named a member of Napoleon's Corps Législatif. The Bank of France began its operations on February 29, 1800, in the former offices of the Caisse des Comptes Courants at the Hôtel Massiac, Place des Victoires. Jean-Frédéric Perregaux was named president of its directing Council of Regents.

=== Late life ===
Claude Perier died at his mansion in Paris on February 6, 1801. He was 59 years old. He had brought the Periers successfully through the difficult years of the Revolution, leaving an enormous fortune and invaluable social and business connections that would help the family on its way to prominence. For the Perier family, he had "opened the doors to the two powers entrusted to Notables, politics and high finance." Paris now became the major arena of Perier business activity. Claude had positioned his family members well to play significant roles in the industrialization of France during the early 19th century.

Addendum regarding the death of Claude Perier:

Writers sometimes report Stendhal's assertion that Claude Perier died of the cold in the night because he was too miserly to pay for wood to heat his mansion. However, as Madeleine Bourset warns in her biography of Casimir Perier, the novelist Stendhal exercised a certain personal bitterness toward Claude Perier, claiming even that his sons, Casimir and Scipion, were left to starve and share clothing for lack of money. Claude was in fact very careful about money and did not pamper his sons. They were not raised with a sense of entitlement. But he loved them and saw to it that they had allowances. He ceded them income-providing properties. As for Claude's death, Bourset references the matter-of-fact report in the Duc d'Audiffret-Pasquier's Notices historiques sur la famille Perier (Paris, 1844), that "he died for having spent an hour in his unheated study wearing a mere dressing-gown."
