= Crolles =

- Commune
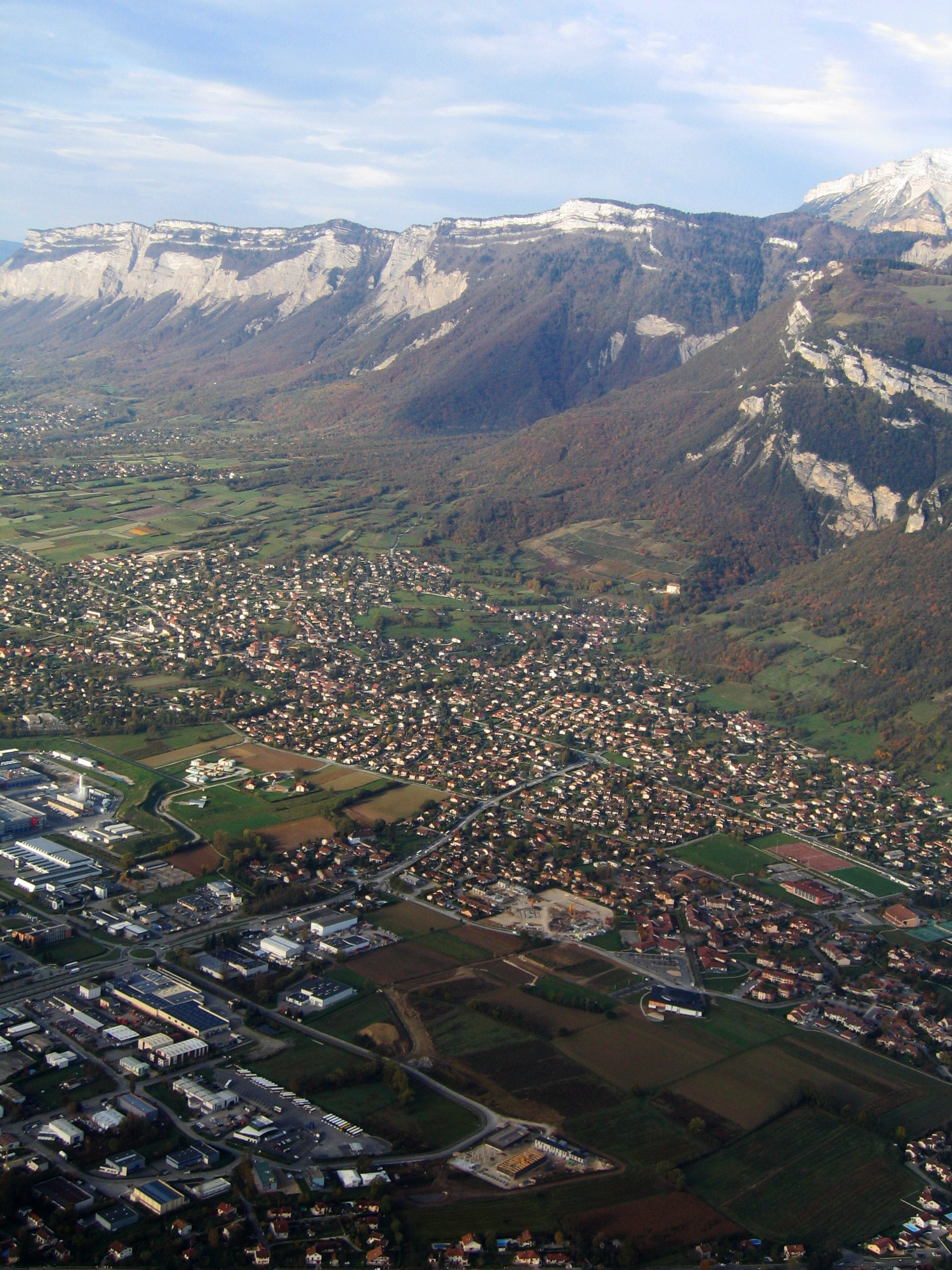
- View of Crolles
- Location of Crolles
- Location within France Location within Auvergne-Rhône-Alpes
- Coordinates: 45°17′09″N 5°53′01″E
- Country: France
- Region: Auvergne-Rhône-Alpes
- Department: Isère
- Arrondissement: Grenoble
- Canton: Le Moyen Grésivaudan
- Intercommunality: CC Le Grésivaudan

Government
  - Mayor (2020–2026): Philippe Lorimier
- Area^{1}: 14 km^{2} (5.4 sq mi)
- Elevation: 245 m (804 ft)
- Highest elevation: 1,000 m (3,300 ft)
- Lowest elevation: 219 m (719 ft)
- Population (2023): 8,609
  - Density: 610/km^{2} (1,600/sq mi)
- Time zone: UTC+01:00 (CET)
  - Summer (DST): UTC+02:00 (CEST)
- INSEE/Postal code: 38140 /38920
- ^{1} French Land Register data, which excludes lakes, ponds, glaciers > 1 km^{2} (0.386 sq mi or 247 acres) and river estuaries.

Crolles (French pronunciation: [kʁol]) is a commune in the Isère department in southeastern France. It is located in the Isère valley, 20 km northeast of Grenoble, upstream on the river Isère. It has given its name to the Dent de Crolles mountain (2,062 m), which stands just above the city.

== Industries ==
Crolles hosts the biggest semiconductor fabrication plant in France (employing 4,000 people, for a total investment of 3 billion euros). First founded by STMicroelectronics in the 1980s, the recent development (Crolles 2, 2003) results from a joint-venture with Philips (today NXP semiconductors) and Motorola.

Crolles is the birthplace of Petzl, manufacturers of safety equipment for mountaineering, caving and vertical safety in civil engineering, which still has its headquarters there and is also the site of the main manufacturing plant of Teisseire, a beverage company now owned by Britvic.

== Population ==
Historical population

Year	Pop.	±% p.a.
1793	1,110	—
1800	1,294	+2.22%
1806	1,412	+1.47%
1821	1,500	+0.40%
1831	1,511	+0.07%
1836	1,554	+0.56%
1841	1,600	+0.59%
1846	1,632	+0.40%
1851	1,549	−1.04%
1856	1,472	−1.01%
1861	1,439	−0.45%
1866	1,404	−0.49%
1872	1,365	−0.47%
1876	1,386	+0.38%
1881	1,276	−1.64%
1886	1,311	+0.54%
1891	1,177	−2.13%
1896	1,167	−0.17%
1901	1,150	−0.29%

Year	Pop.	±% p.a.
1906	1,103	−0.83%
1911	1,028	−1.40%
1921	1,021	−0.07%
1926	1,162	+2.62%
1931	1,213	+0.86%
1936	1,102	−1.90%
1946	964	−1.33%
1954	1,228	+3.07%
1962	1,548	+2.94%
1968	1,723	+1.80%
1975	2,102	+2.88%
1982	3,492	+7.52%
1990	5,829	+6.61%
1999	8,260	+3.95%
2007	8,429	+0.25%
2012	8,237	−0.46%
2017	8,247	+0.02%
2023	8,609	+0.72%

Source: EHESS and INSEE (1968-2023)

== See also ==
- Communes of the Isère department
