= Vizille =

- Commune
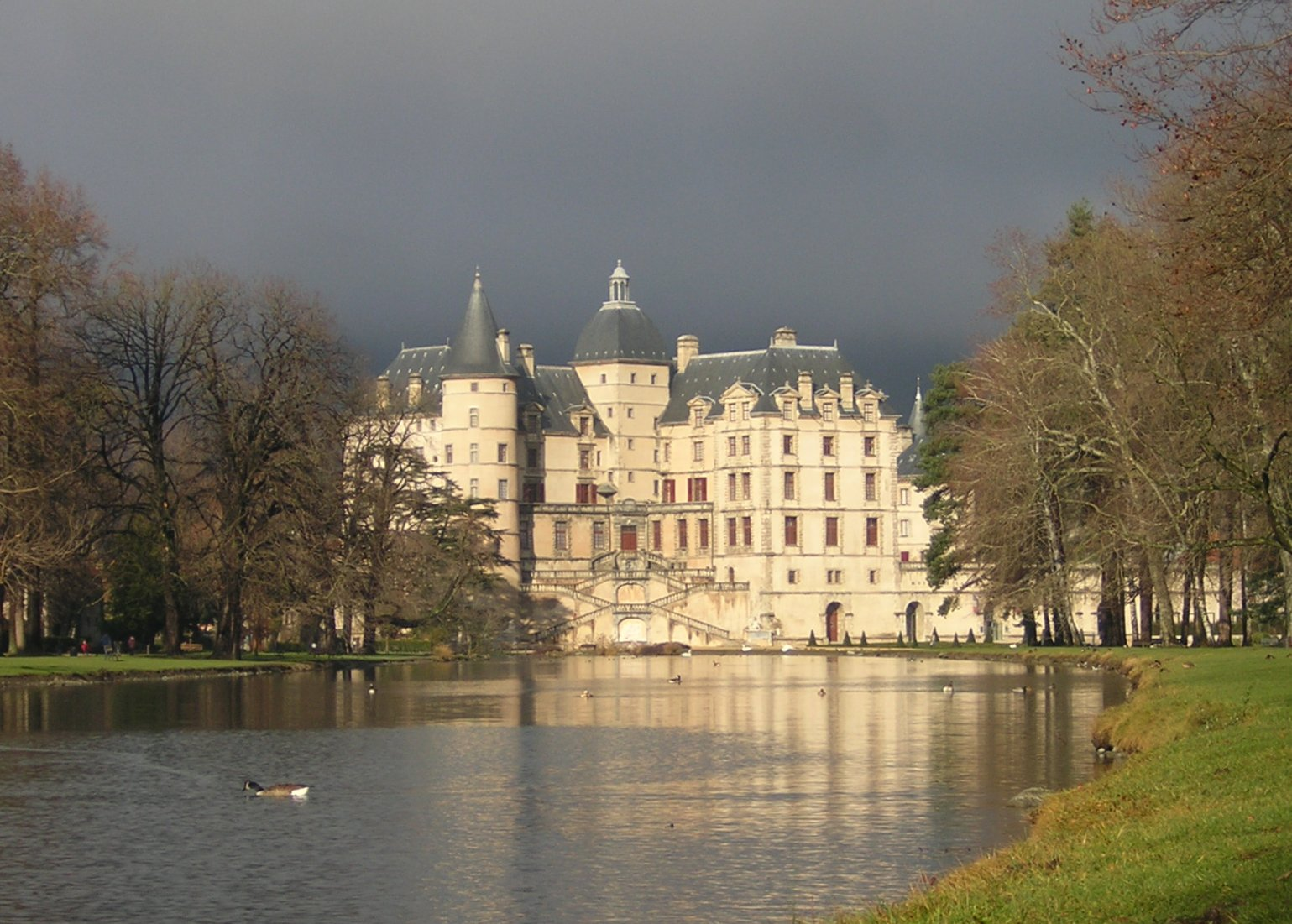
- Château de Vizille

- Coat of arms
- Location of Vizille
- Location within France Location within Auvergne-Rhône-Alpes
- Coordinates: 45°04′32″N 5°46′24″E
- Country: France
- Region: Auvergne-Rhône-Alpes
- Department: Isère
- Arrondissement: Grenoble
- Canton: Oisans-Romanche
- Intercommunality: Grenoble-Alpes Métropole

Government
  - Mayor (2020–2026): Catherine Troton
- Area^{1}: 10.51 km^{2} (4.06 sq mi)
- Elevation: 307 m (1,007 ft)
- Highest elevation: 1,016 m (3,333 ft)
- Lowest elevation: 268 m (879 ft)
- Population (2023): 7,292
  - Density: 693.8/km^{2} (1,797/sq mi)
- Time zone: UTC+01:00 (CET)
  - Summer (DST): UTC+02:00 (CEST)
- INSEE/Postal code: 38562 /38220
- ^{1} French Land Register data, which excludes lakes, ponds, glaciers > 1 km^{2} (0.386 sq mi or 247 acres) and river estuaries.

Vizille (French pronunciation: [vizˈil]; Arpitan: Veselye) is a commune in the southeastern French department of Isère.

== Population ==
Historical population

Year	Pop.	±% p.a.
1793	1,593	—
1800	1,655	+0.55%
1806	1,927	+2.57%
1821	2,023	+0.32%
1831	2,750	+3.12%
1836	3,105	+2.46%
1841	2,907	−1.31%
1846	3,004	+0.66%
1851	3,125	+0.79%
1856	3,291	+1.04%
1861	3,546	+1.50%
1866	3,928	+2.07%
1872	3,903	−0.11%
1876	3,922	+0.12%
1881	3,904	−0.09%
1886	4,310	+2.00%
1891	4,252	−0.27%
1896	4,516	+1.21%
1901	4,951	+1.86%

Year	Pop.	±% p.a.
1906	4,328	−2.65%
1911	4,102	−1.07%
1921	4,461	+0.84%
1926	4,512	+0.23%
1931	5,053	+2.29%
1936	5,160	+0.42%
1946	5,043	−0.23%
1954	5,977	+2.15%
1962	6,493	+1.04%
1968	6,882	+0.97%
1975	6,986	+0.21%
1982	7,162	+0.36%
1990	7,094	−0.12%
1999	7,465	+0.57%
2007	7,714	+0.41%
2012	7,647	−0.17%
2017	7,361	−0.76%
2023	7,292	−0.16%

Source: EHESS and INSEE (1968-2023)

== Château ==
The Château de Vizille houses the Musée de la Révolution française, containing archival and rare materials from the French Revolution. It was rebuilt in the form it retains today during the seventeenth century by François de Bonne, duc de Lesdiguières, the last Connétable de France. On 21 July 1788, the Assemblée des notables met here in the salle du jeu de paume to discuss actions that would lead to the Revolution.

== See also ==
- Communes of the Isère department
