= Musée de la Révolution française =

Museum in Vizille, France

Coordinates: 45°04′32″N 5°46′23″E

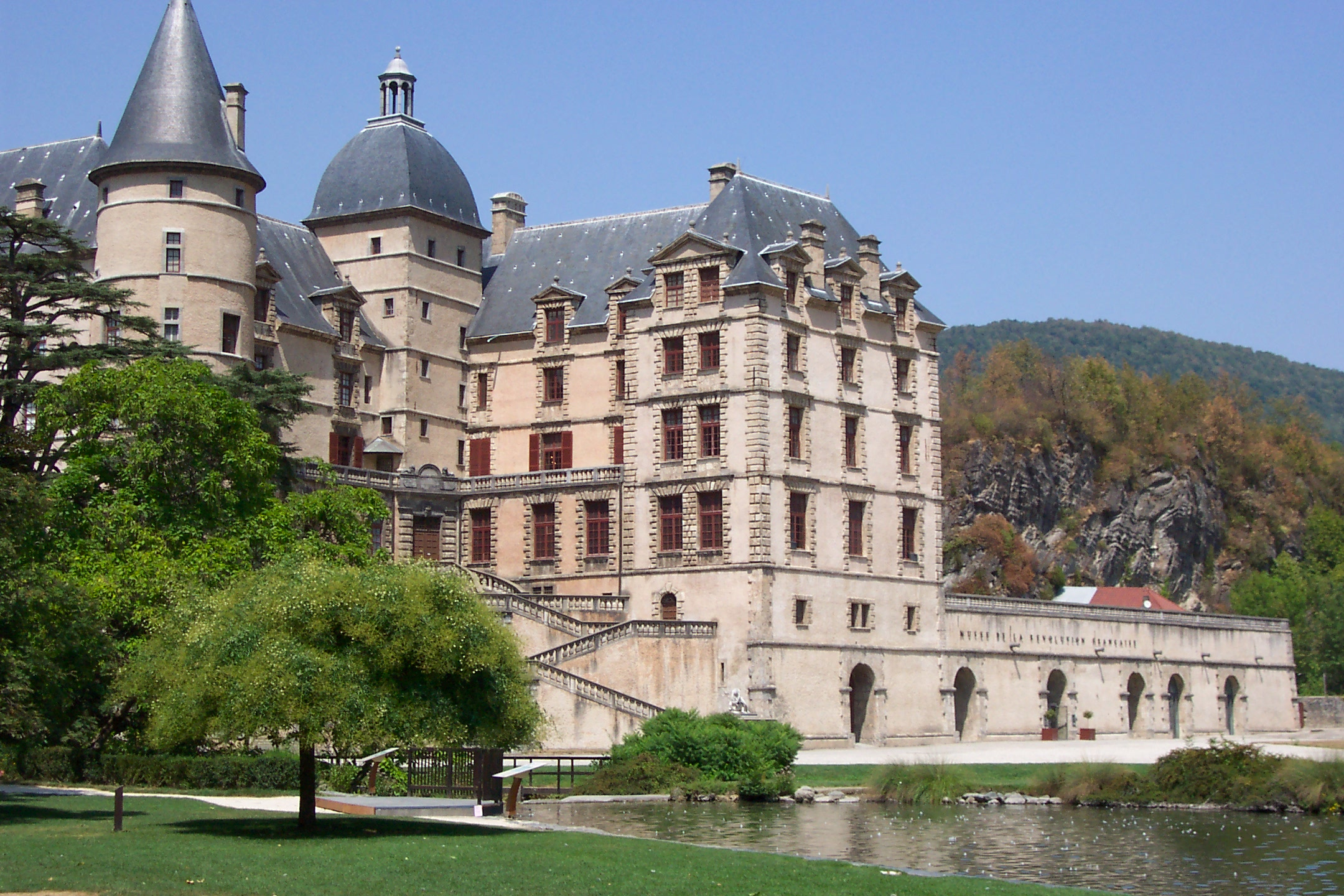
- Museum, in the Château de Vizille
- Established: 1983
- Location: Place du château, Vizille, Dept. of Isère, Auvergne-Rhône-Alpes
- Type: Art museum, design/textile museum, historic site
- Visitors: 70,002 (2017)
- Director: Alain Chevalier
- Website: musee-revolution-francaise.fr

The Musée de la Révolution française (Museum of the French Revolution) is a departmental museum in the French town of Vizille, 15 kilometres (9.3 mi) south of Grenoble on the Route Napoléon. It is the only museum in the world dedicated to the French Revolution.

Its exhibits include Jean-Baptiste Wicar's The French Republic (the first known representation of the French Republic) and William James Grant's La cocarde (The Cockade), representing Josephine de Beauharnais with her daughter Hortense. The museum was opened on 13 July 1984 in the presence of Louis Mermaz, president of the National Assembly of France.

It is housed in the Château de Vizille, which has a long history of artistic conservation, and is home to a documentation centre on the French revolutionary period. The museum also organizes international symposiums about the French Revolution.

== Castle history ==
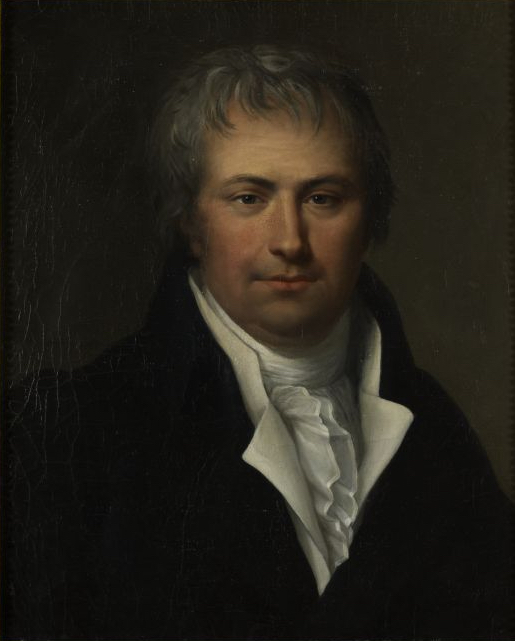
Claude Perier, owner of the castle in 1788

Located 15 kilometres (9 mi) south of Grenoble on the Route Napoléon, the Château de Vizille (Castle Lesdiguières) is the former home of the Dukes of Lesdiguières. The founder of the dynasty, François de Bonne de Lesdiguières, completed his castle in 1619. King Louis XIII, who made him Constable of France, visited it on 3 December 1622. In 1716, the building was transferred to the Dukes of Villeroy. The Perier family owned it from 5 June 1780 to 23 December 1895. The castle was the summer residence of the presidents of the French Republic from 1924 to 1972. France ceded the castle and its domain to the General Council of Isère, which was entrusted with giving it a prestigious cultural role, in 1973.

On 21 July 1788, during the presidency of the count of Morges, the Assembly of Vizille met in the castle's jeu de paume room after the 7 June Day of the Tiles in Grenoble. Pope Pius VI spent a night in the castle at the invitation of owner Claude Perier on 5 July 1799, and Napoleon stopped there during his return from the island of Elba on 7 March 1815. Used as a factory, the castle experienced a fire in the night of 9–10 November 1825 which spread to part of the city. In 1828, Adolphe Perier (son of owner Augustin Perier and grandson of Claude) married Nathalie de La Fayette (daughter of Georges Washington de La Fayette and granddaughter of the Marquis de La Fayette) in the castle. Absent from the ceremony, the Marquis de La Fayette was a guest on 19 August 1829 during a visit with Nathalie. Adolphe Perier, after the death of his father in December 1833, continued restoring the castle. In 1862, after Adolphe's bankruptcy, the Académie des Beaux-Arts classified the castle as a monument historique and Henry Fontenilliat (step-father of Auguste Casimir-Perier) became the new owner. Two years later, Henri Fontenilliat died; his daughter, Camille (Auguste's wife), inherited the castle.

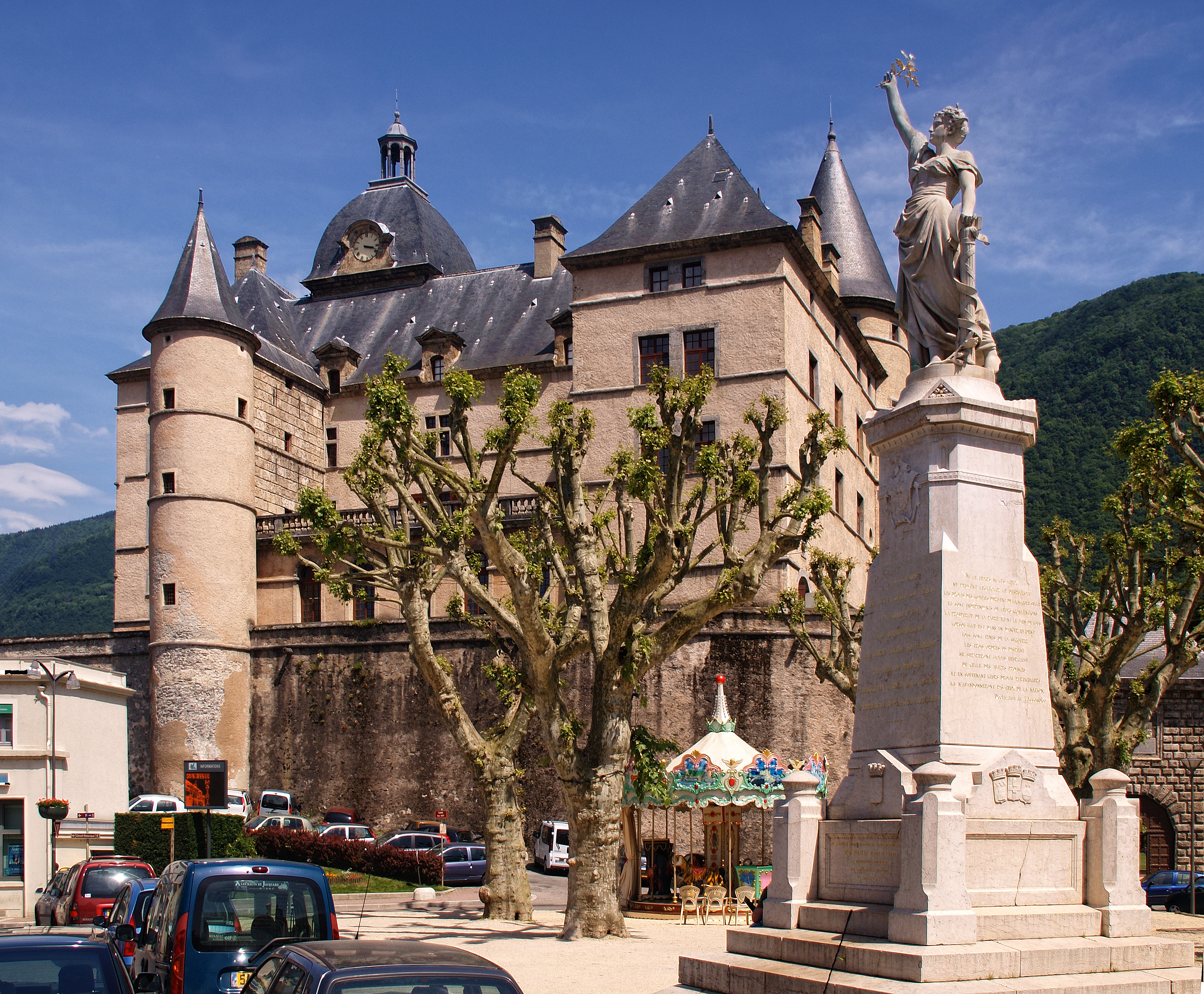
Henri Ding, La Liberté, also called Marianne (1888)

The lessons of the 1825 fire were not learned; on 17 February 1865, a second fire destroyed an L-shaped wing containing the jeu de paume room and a battle gallery built in 1615 by Lesdiguières. They were never rebuilt.

Activity in the castle's printing factory halted. Auguste Casimir-Perier and his wife, Camille, received Philippe d'Orléans (count of Paris) in 1872 and Adolphe Thiers in 1874. For the centenary of the Assembly of Vizille on 21 July 1888, President Sadi Carnot dedicated a statue of Liberty (also called Marianne) in front of the castle. Sculpted by Henri Ding, its pedestal is engraved with sentences from the assembly and the names of representatives of the province of Dauphiné.

Two months after France purchased the castle, La Dépêche dauphinoise mentioned the possibility of a museum. The newspaper mentioned it again on 6 March 1932, specifying a museum of the French Revolution. With the opening that summer of the nearby Napoleon Road, a room was devoted to the history of the castle. After the 1981 election of François Mitterrand, the 2 March 1982 decentralization law permitted a museum dedicated to the French Revolution far from Paris. At its 10 June 1983 meeting, the general council of Isère created a museum of the French Revolution in the castle of Vizille. Two people contributed to the museum's founding: Departmental Archives of Isère director Vital Chomel and historian Robert Chagny, curator of its first temporary exhibition. Others who participated in the collection of the first works were Jacqueline Mongellaz (1984–1990) and Alain Chevalier (since 1988). The first rooms of the museum were set up at the beginning of 1984, and its first director (from 1984 to 1996) was art historian Philippe Bordes.

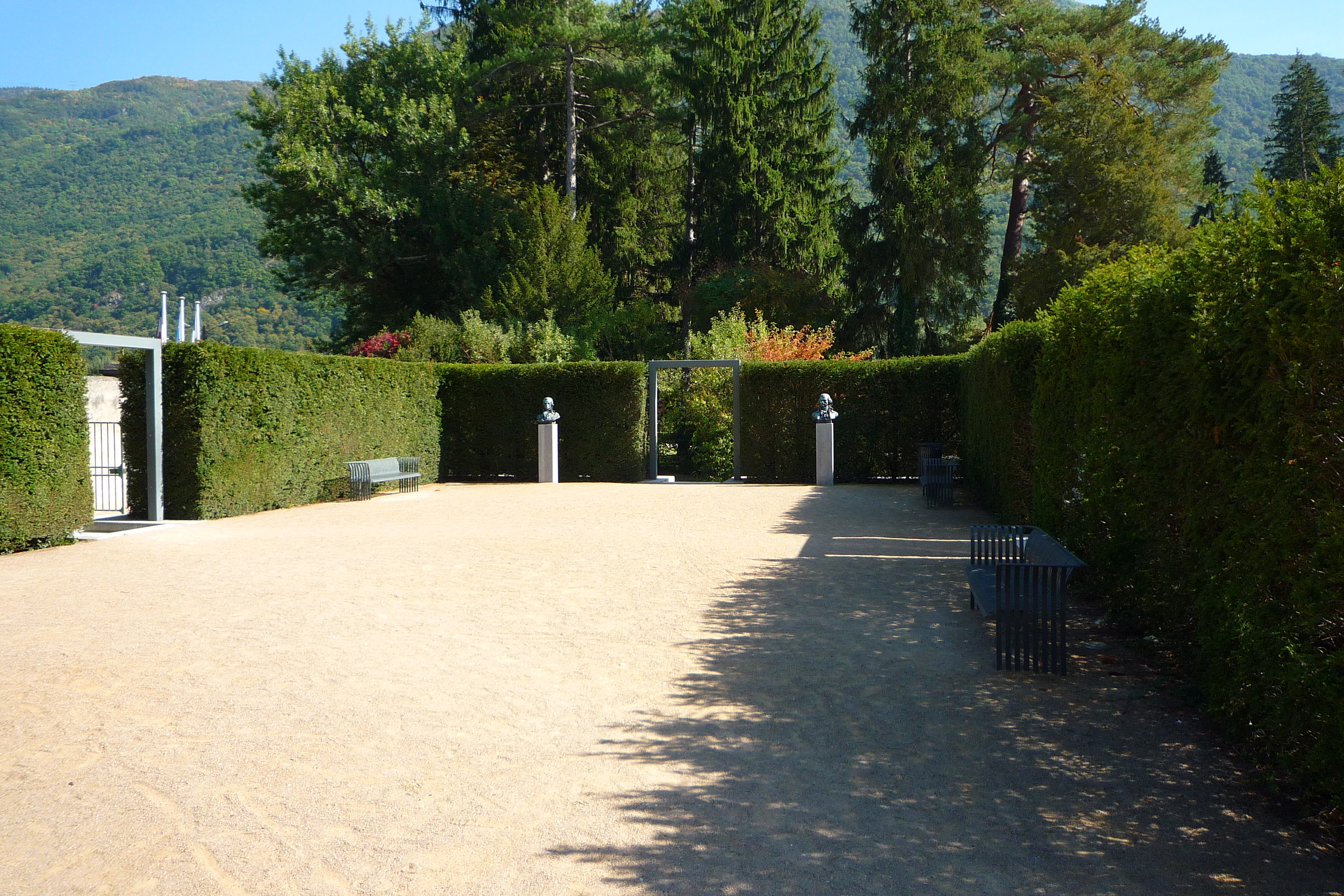
Former site of the jeu de paume hall

The museum was dedicated on 13 July 1984 in the presence of the President of the National Assembly, two ministers, and president of its scientific and technical council Michel Vovelle. In November 1987, work began on the Hall of Columns (later called the Republic Room) two large staircases ascending from the current entrance, and elevator access to all levels of the museum. Two new halls were dedicated on 21 July 1988, but financing difficulties delayed the completion of 600 square metres (6,458 square feet) of the Hall of Columns. When it opened in March 1992, the museum contained twenty rooms on five levels. Since 2010, the site of the former jeu de paume hall (removed in 1865) is indicated by a hedge to the right of the museum entrance.

== Collections ==
The museum's themes, in addition to the revolution, are contemporary movements such as Lumières and Romanticism. It features works of art and historical objects from, before and after the revolutionary era.

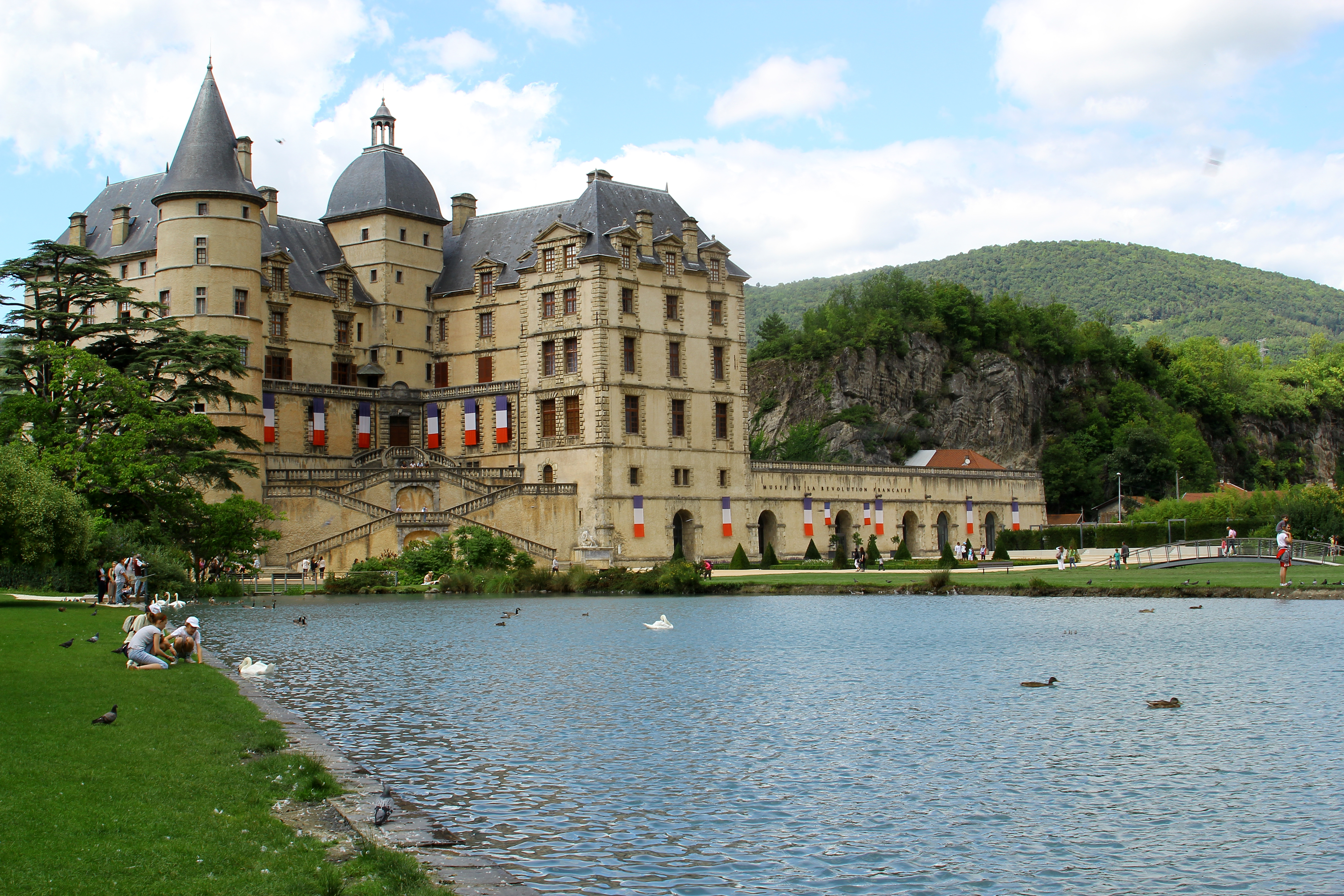
Chateau de Vizille, home of the museum

The museum is an historical museum based on works of art. These works, more than historical illustrations, are keys to a better understanding of the upheavals and historical context. The paintings and sculptures of the revolutionary era span a variety of styles and genres. The paintings are allegories, historical events, portraits, ancient (or tragic) scenes, and landscapes. Of the statues, several busts are faithful representations of Antoine Barnave, Bailly, Mirabeau, Louis XVII, Robespierre, Danton and his wife Antoinette, and General Lafayette. Statues in a variety of materials include Madame Roland, Saint-Just, and Jean-Jacques Rousseau. Decorative arts illustrate everyday life: furniture, porcelain, and French, English and Dutch faience. Unique objects are stones from the Bastille, swords from the National Guard, and musical instruments. Drawings, prints, and fragile works (fans, miniatures, and printed fabrics) are protected from light and presented in temporary exhibitions.

Nineteenth-century works include two paintings by Lucien-Étienne Mélingue: Le matin du 10 Therminor An II (The Morning of 10 Thermidor Year II) (1877) and Jean-Paul Marat (1879), which demonstrate the power of references to the movement which led to the French First Republic in the context of their time. Other painters are present in the rooms with Louis-Pierre Baltard, Pierre-Nicolas Legrand de Lérant, Nanine Vallain, Guillaume Guillon-Lethière, Johann Baptist von Lampi the Elder, Adolf Ulrik Wertmüller, Antoine-François Callet, Alfred Elmore, Auguste Vinchon, Henri Félix Emmanuel Philippoteaux, Charles Louis Müller or Jacques-Louis David.

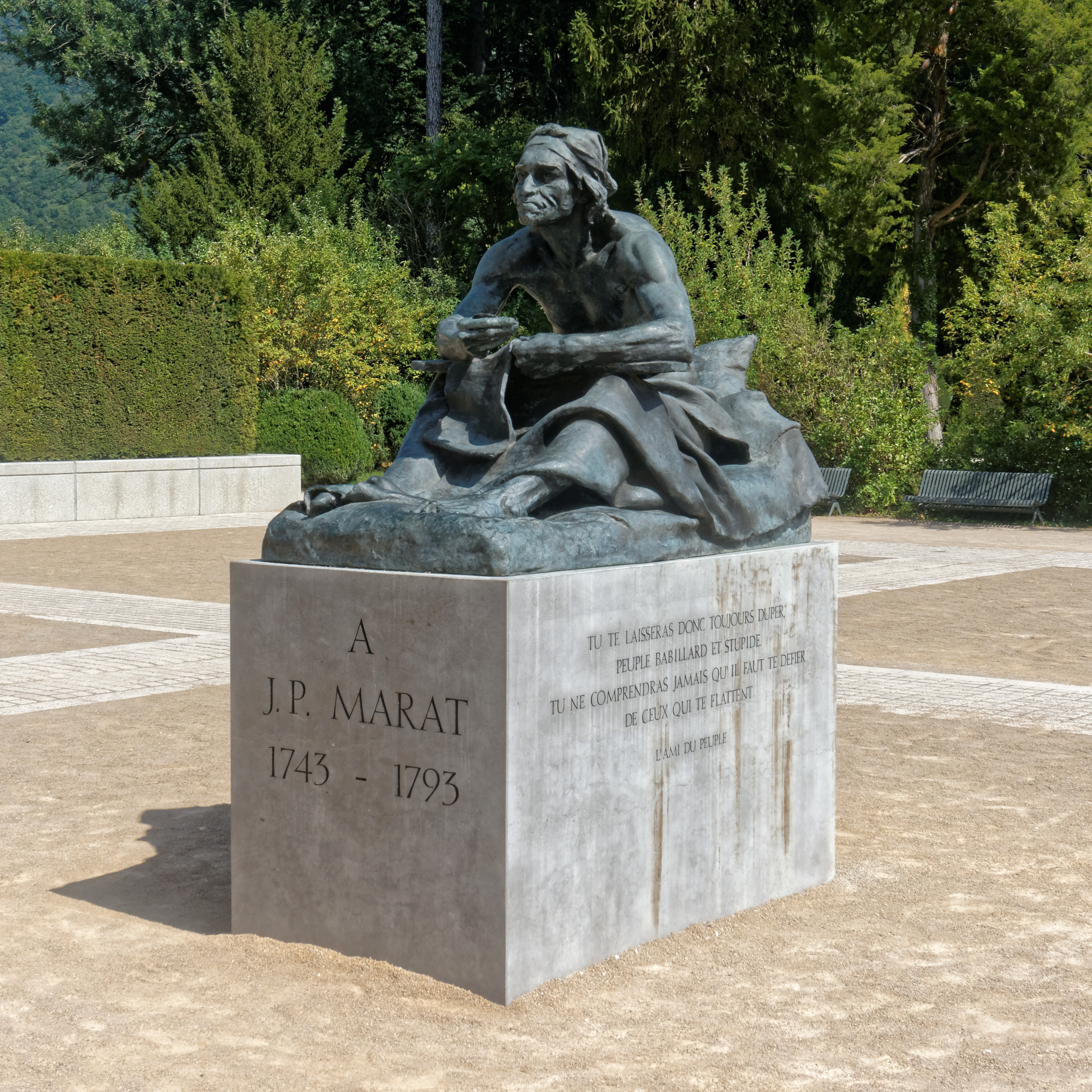
Jean Baffier's statue of Jean-Paul Marat, facing the entrance

Alexandre Debelle (curator of the museum of Grenoble) painted The Assembly of Notables in Vizille, 1788 (also known as the Assembly of the Three Orders of the Dauphiné) in 1853, illustrating the Assembly of Vizille; the painting is on the museum third floor, facing the staircase. About 60 Dauphine notables are depicted in the painting, and a sketch underneath helps visitors locate them. They include lawyer and future mayor of Grenoble Antoine Barnave (standing on the platform), his colleague Mounier (sitting behind the table—with the Count of Morges presiding—and holding a sheet in his hand) and Charles Renauldon on the left, future representative in the Chamber of Representatives and future mayor of Grenoble.

A bronze statue of Jean-Paul Marat, made in 2013 by the Barthélemy Art foundry, replaced Jean Baffier's 1883 version. The sculpture, on the museum's forecourt, was dedicated on 16 July 2013. Baffier's statue was purchased by the city of Paris and installed in several public parks (the Parc Montsouris, the gardens of the Carnavalet Museum and the Parc des Buttes Chaumont) before it was melted down during the Second World War. The stone pedestal supporting the statue contains a quote from Marat's newspaper, L'Ami du peuple.

== Library ==
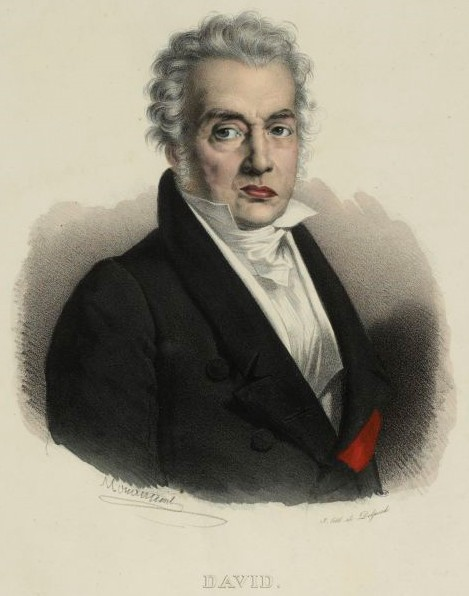
Portrait of Jacques-Louis David by fellow artist François-Séraphin Delpech, in the museum

The Albert Soboul Library and Documentation Centre provides researchers and students with an important resource of often-rare documentation of the art and history of the French Revolution. Created in June 1982 (shortly before the museum opened), it has occupied two levels of the museum's north wing since 2001. In addition to busts and paintings of revolutionary-era figures, it contains documentation of various aspects of the French Revolution, including its artistic and cultural impacts.

The 27,000-title collection, including 20,000 in history, 3,000 in art history and 4,000 works published between 1750 and 1810, is largely made up of legacies and donations from libraries of French Revolution historians. Acquisitions continue to be made worldwide, and a reserve of 4,500 prints dating to before 1805 is kept at a constant temperature and protected from light.

The library was named in June 2005 for historian Albert Soboul, the foremost French authority on the revolutionary era (who bequeathed his collection of books on the revolution to the museum before his death in 1982). The library was expanded with the libraries of historians Jacques Godechot, Jean-René Suratteau and Roger Barny, which were donated by their families. Visited by researchers from around the world, the library is part of the Bibliothèque municipale de Grenoble network.

== Temporary exhibits ==
- 2017–2018: François de Bonne, Duke of Lesdiguières (French: La Splendeur des Lesdiguières)
- 2018: The misfortunes of Louis XVII (French: Heurs et malheurs de Louis XVII, arrêt sur images)
- 2019: A people and its Révolution (comics)
- 2021 : La Marseillaise (national anthem of France)
- 2022 : The landscape under the French revolution

== Gallery ==
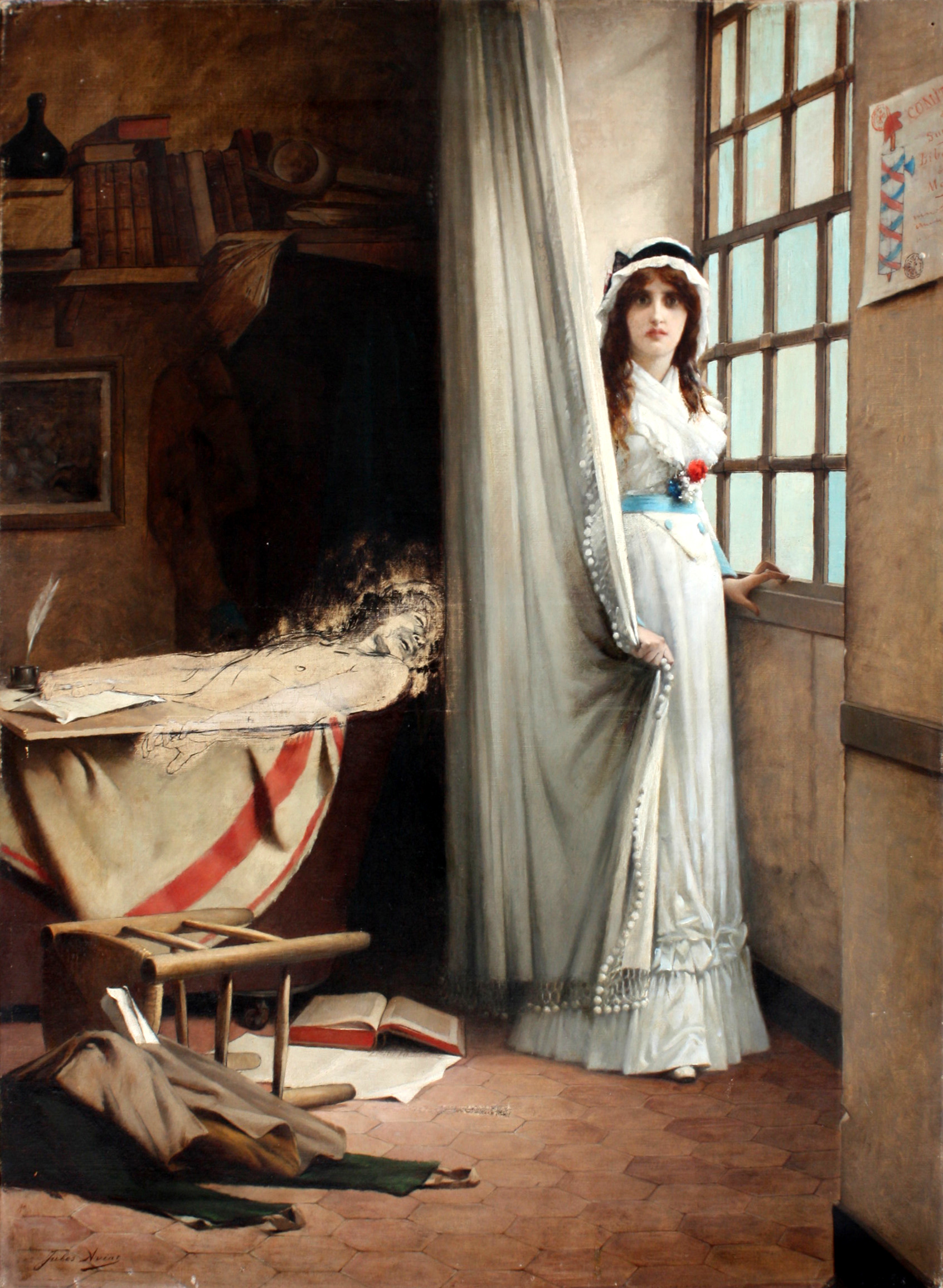
Jules-Charles Aviat, Charlotte Corday and Marat (1880)

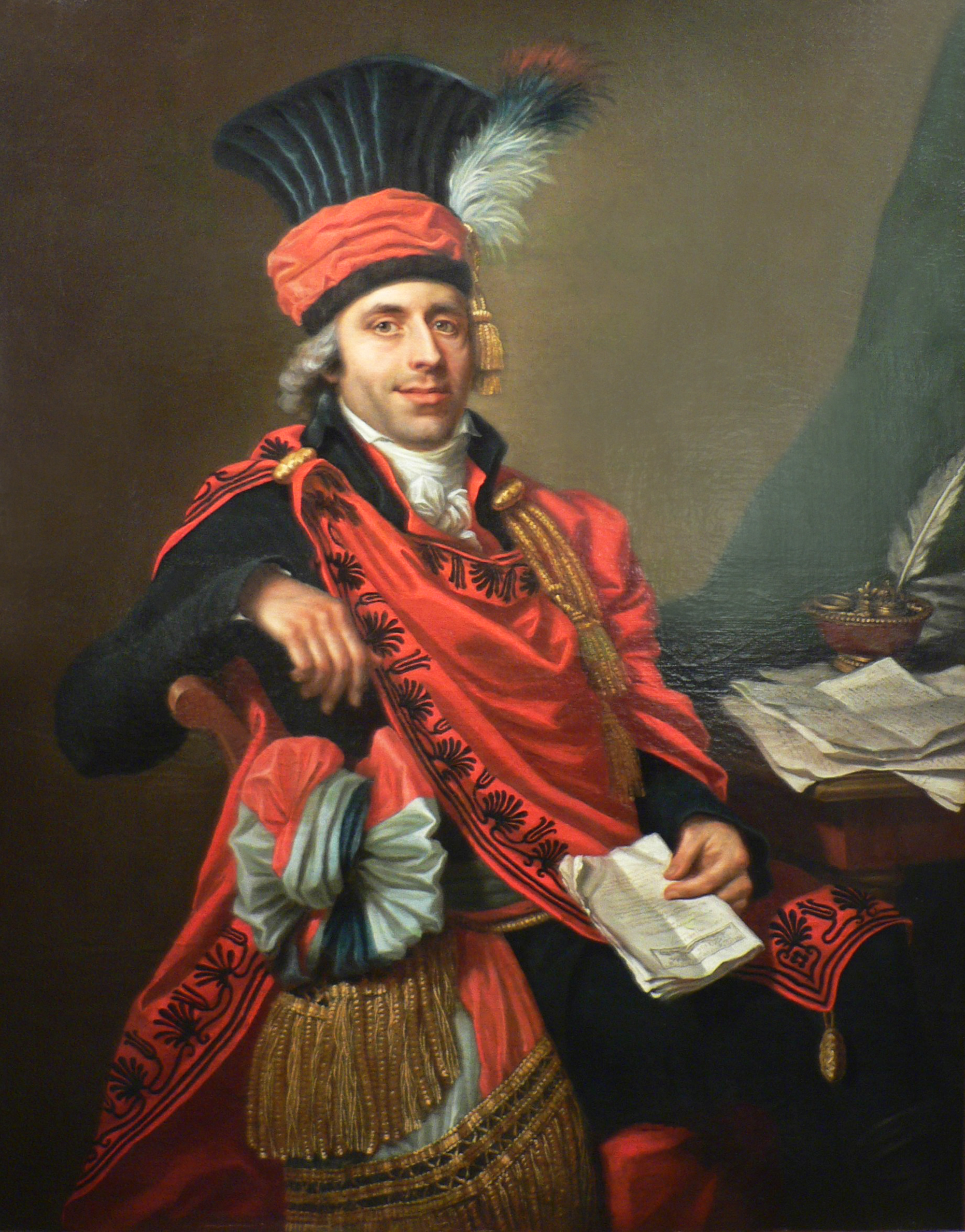
Thomas Bouquerot de Voligny (1755-1841), deputy to the Council of Ancients

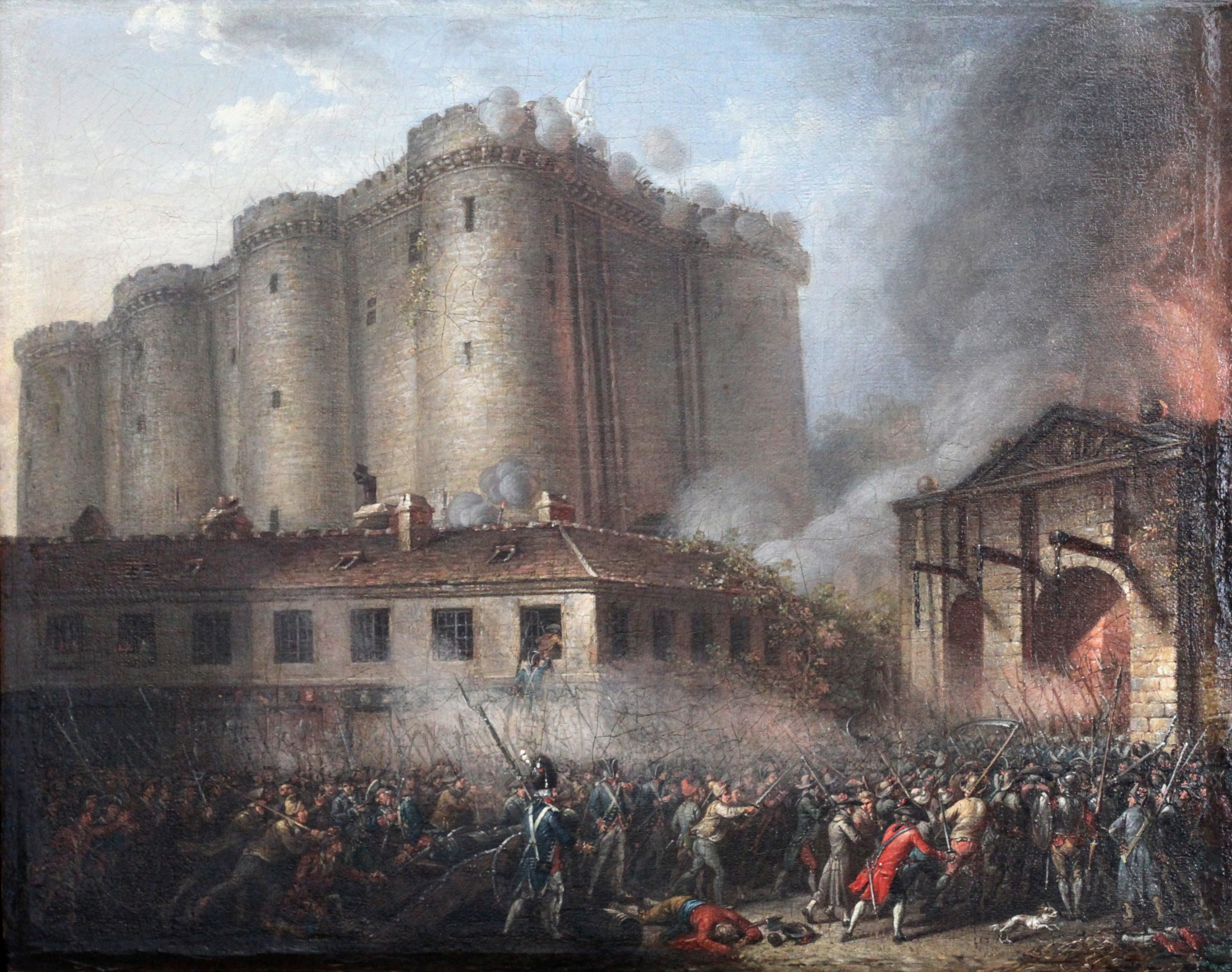
Storming of the Bastille

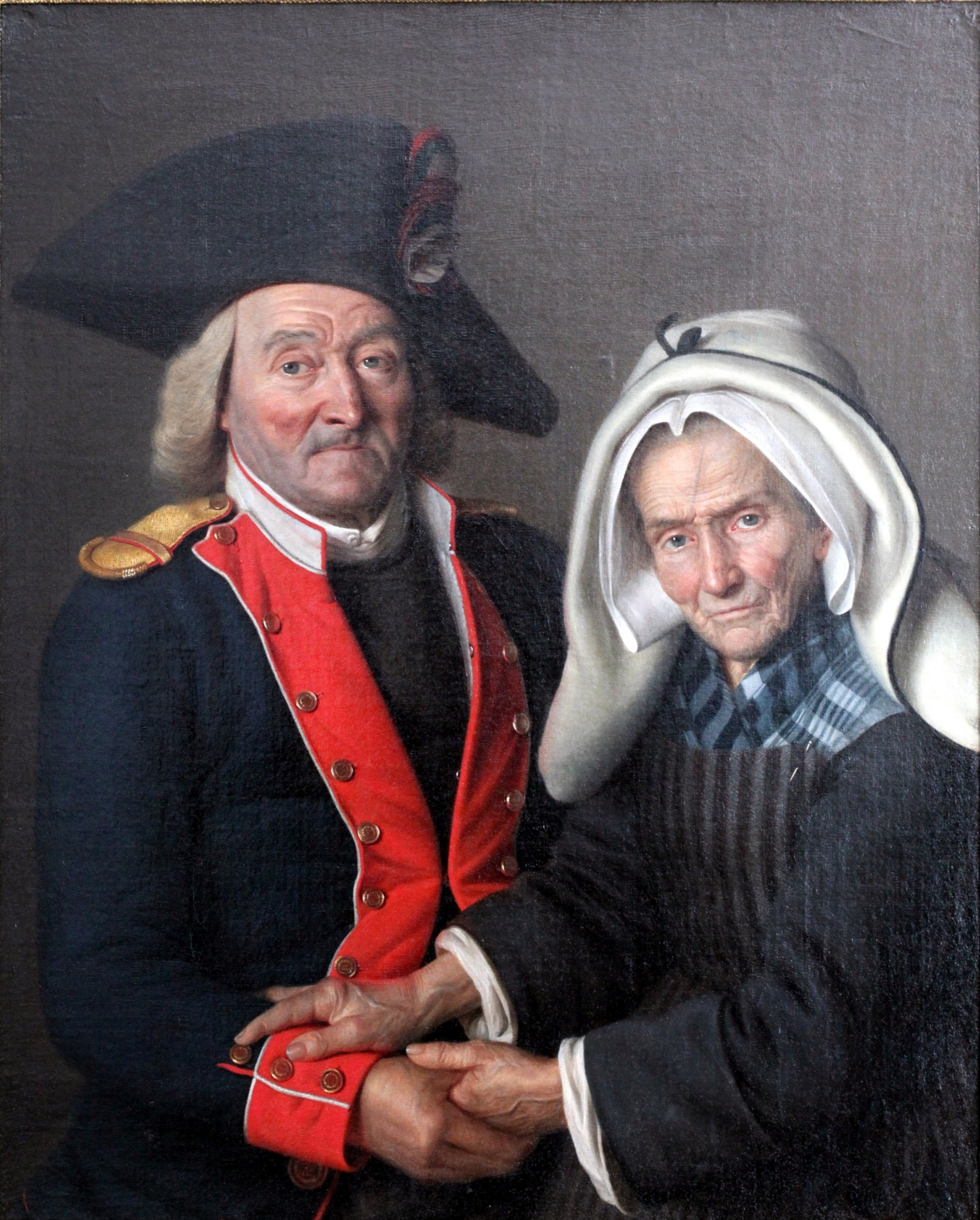
Remi-Fursy Descarsin, A National Guard and his wife (1791)

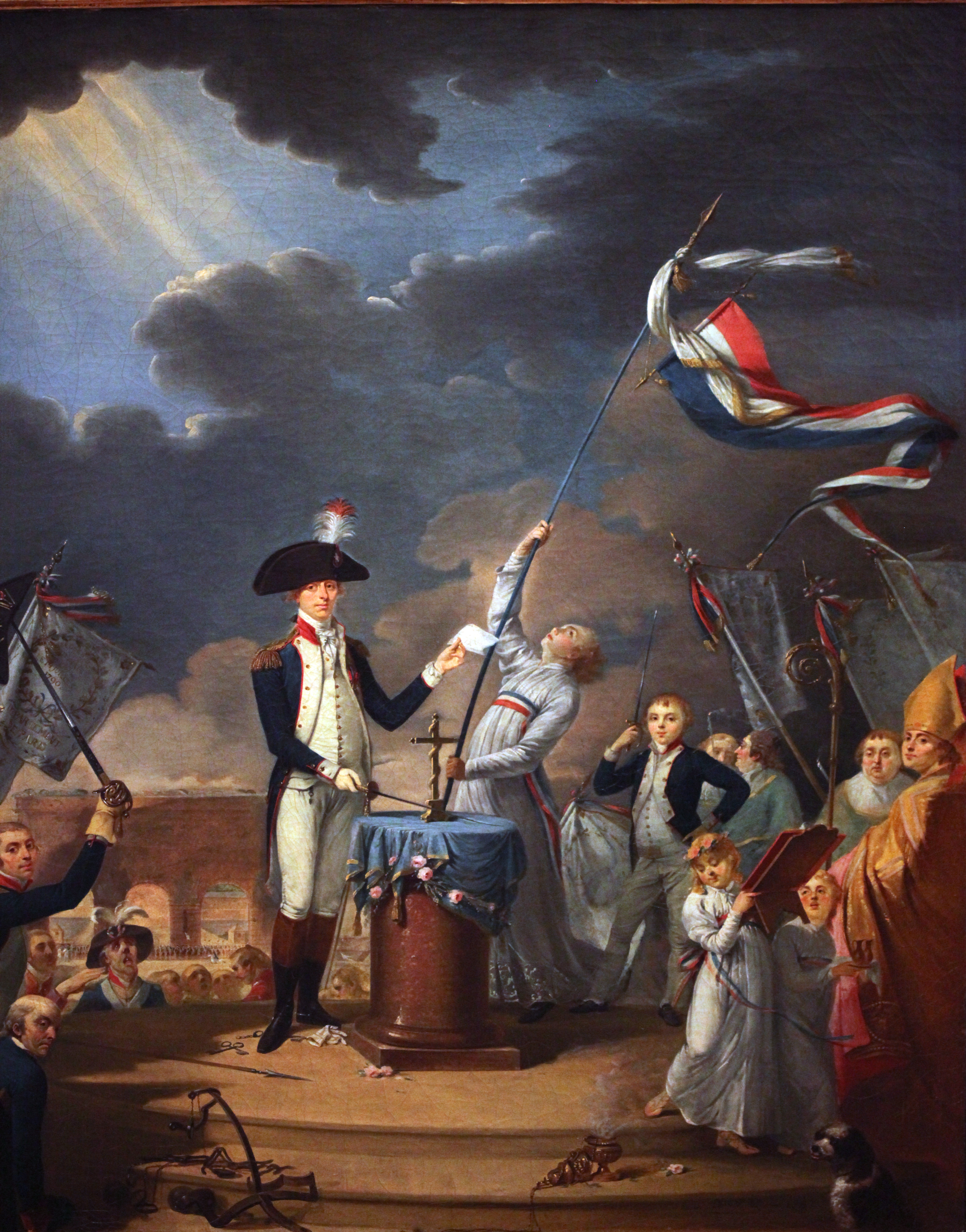
Oath by Lafayette at the Fête de la Fédération, 14 July 1790

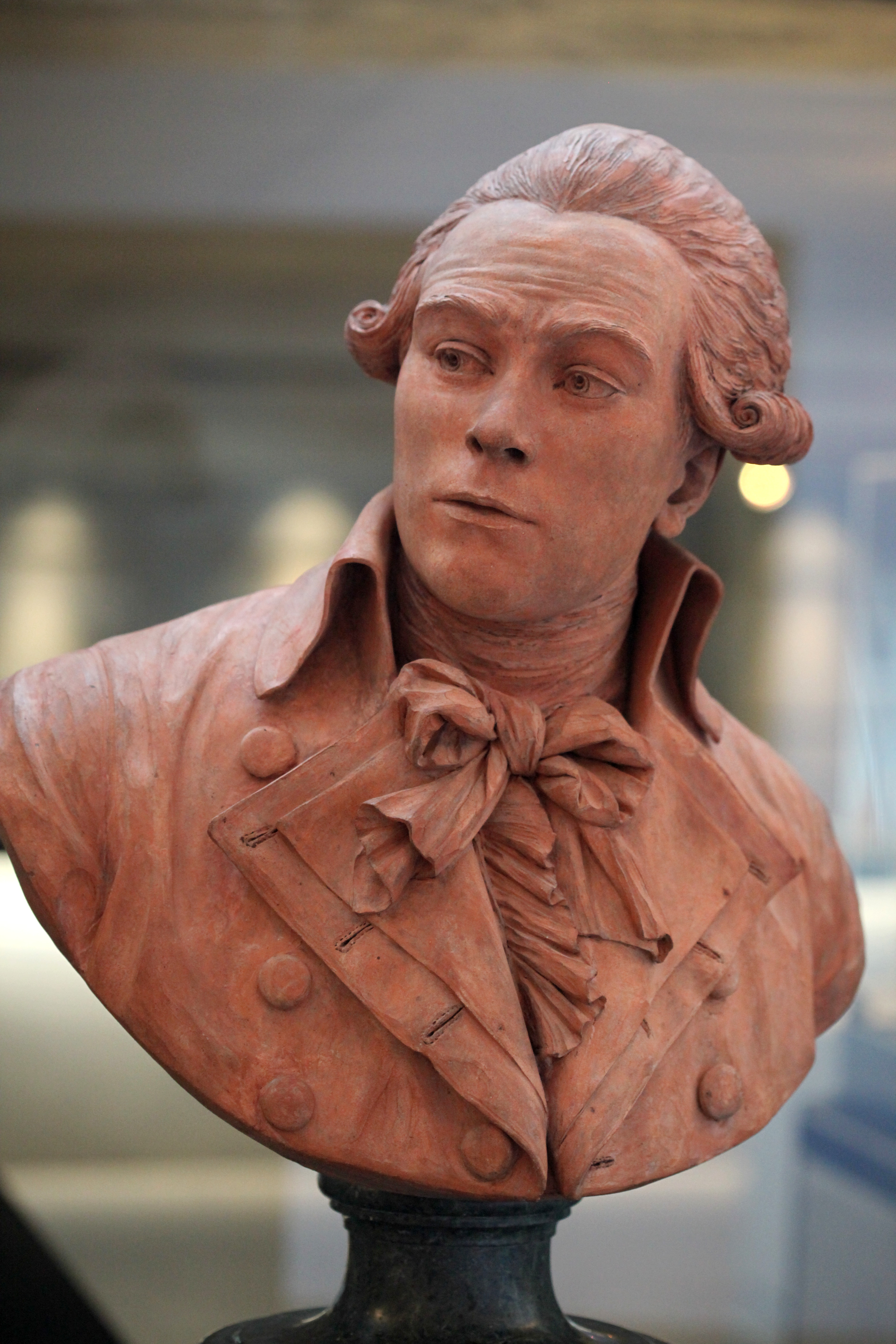
Maximilien Robespierre, 1791 bust by Claude-André Deseine

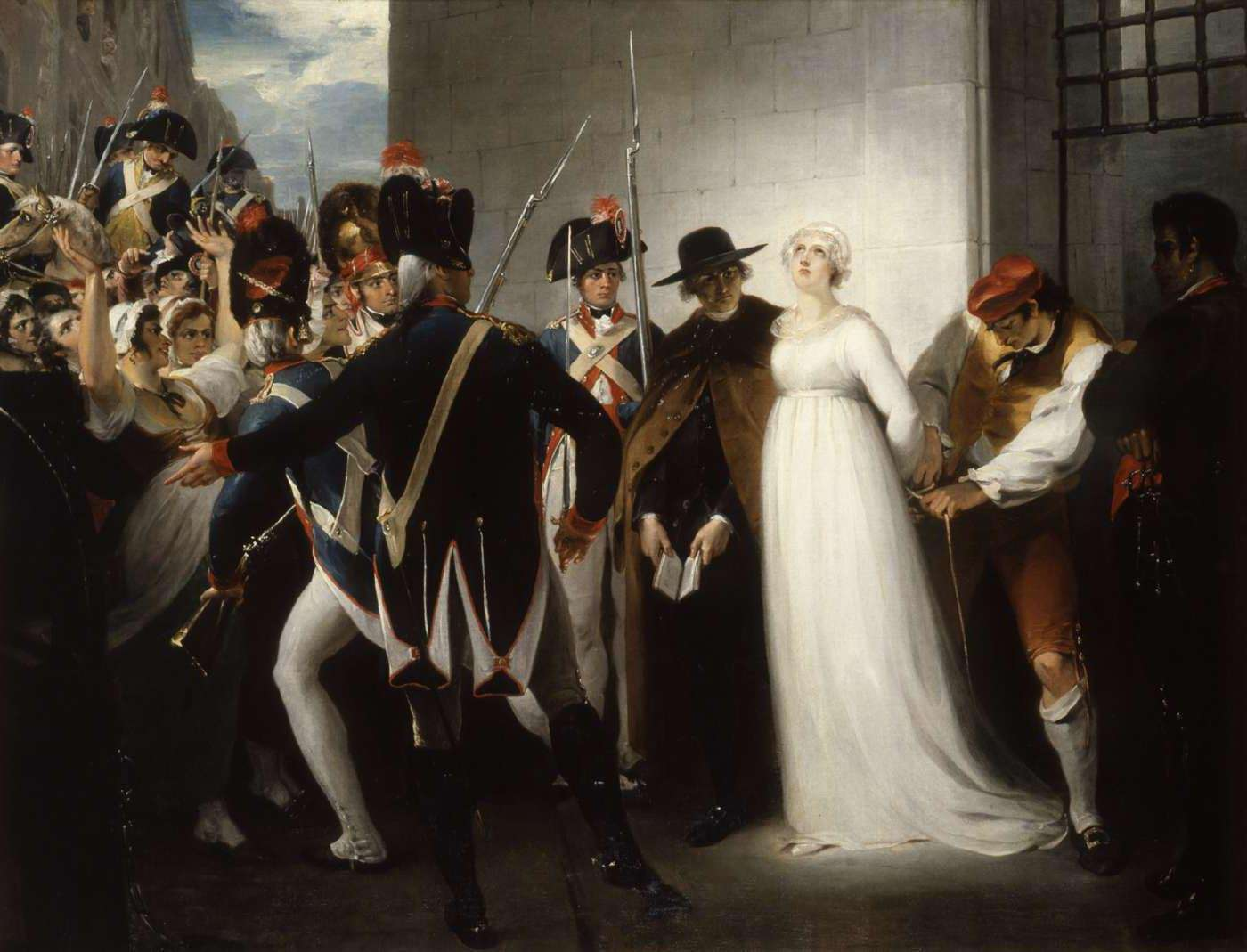
William Hamilton, Marie Antoinette Being Taken to Her Execution (1794)

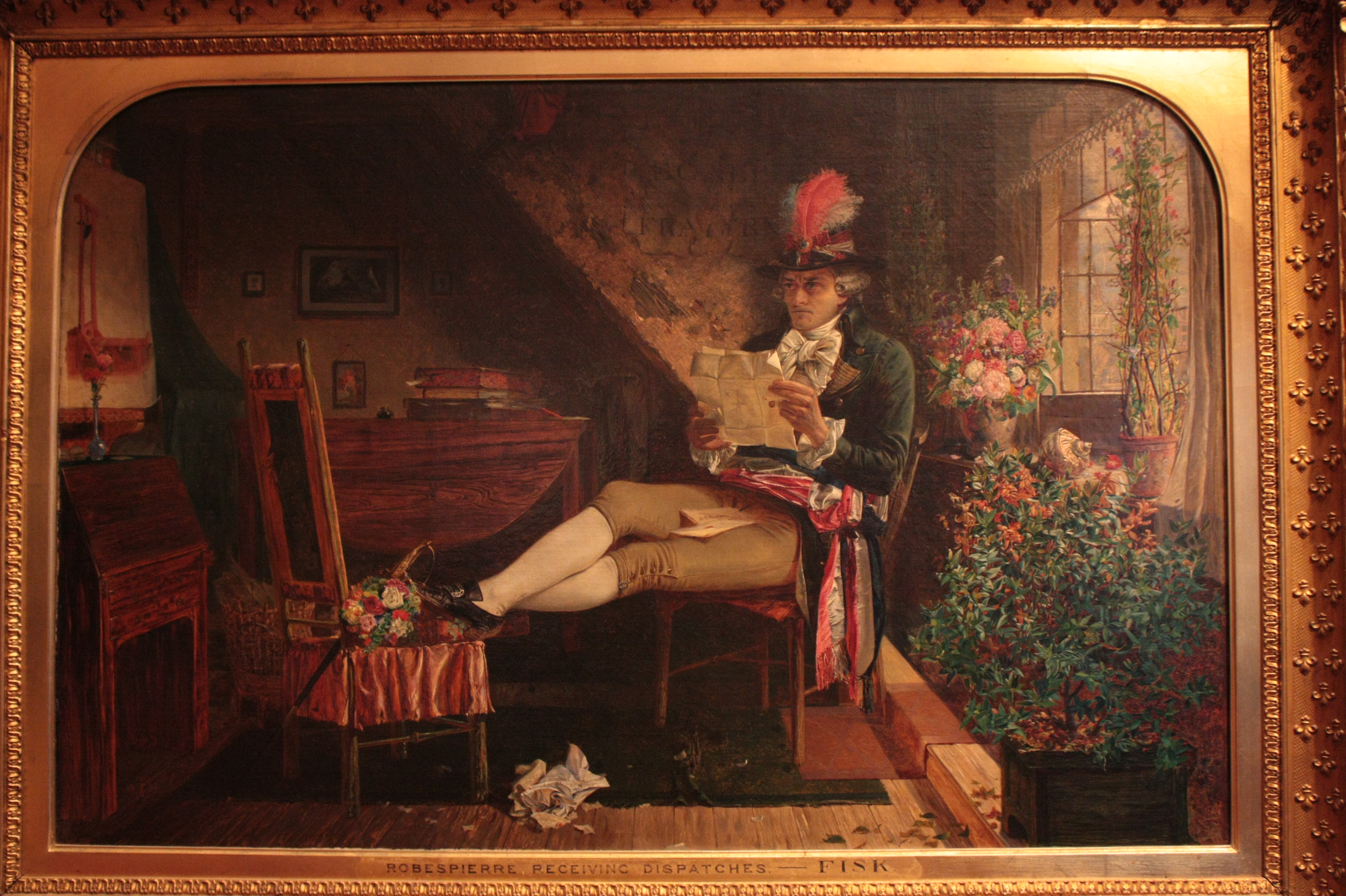
William Henry Fisk, Robespierre receiving letters from friends of his victims threatening to murder him (1863)

== Bibliography ==
- Philippe Bordes, Alain Chevalier, Catalogue des peintures, sculptures et dessins du Musée de la Révolution française, 1996 ISBN 2-7118-3478-6.
