= Château de Vizille =

Castle in Auvergne-Rhône-Alpes, France

Coordinates: 45°4′31″N 5°46′23″E

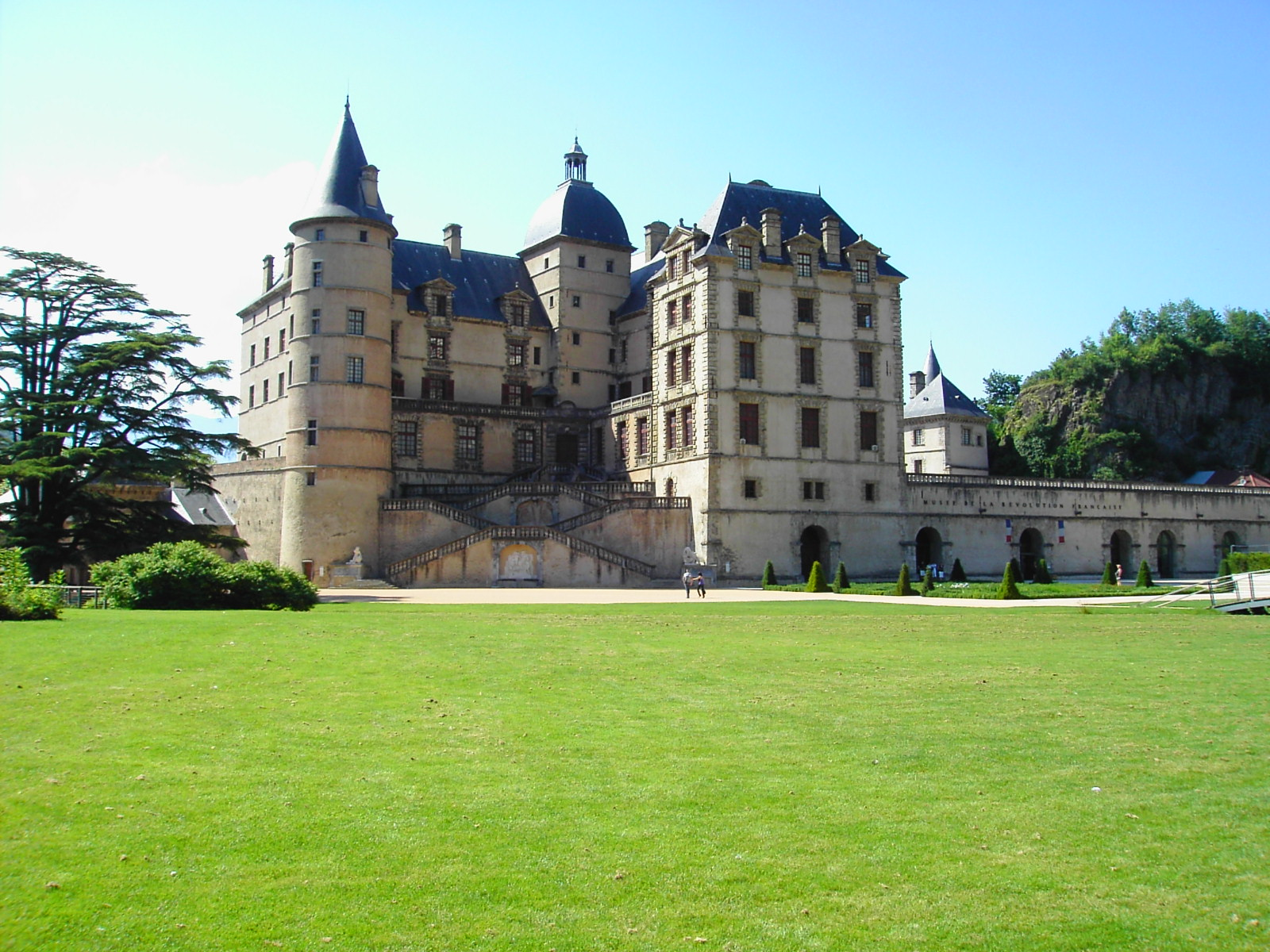
The castle seen from its park

The Château de Vizille is a castle in the French town of Vizille near Grenoble. It is one of the most prestigious and important castles of the Dauphiné Region. Traditionally, from the 14th century, the Dauphiné was the homeland of the inheritor of the French throne. Today the Château de Vizille houses the Musée de la Révolution française.

== History ==
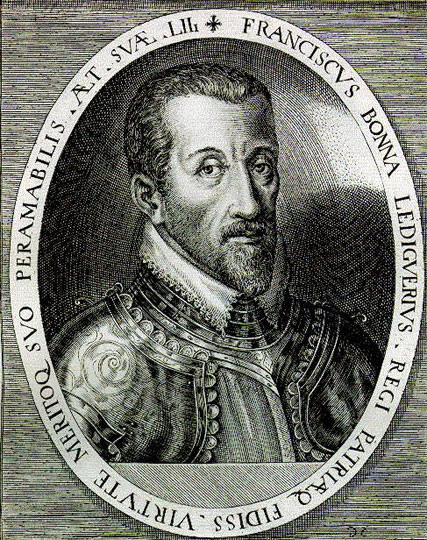
François de Bonne, Duke of Lesdiguières

The former castle was held during the French Wars of Religion by the Catholics. With the peace settlement in 1593, the property was bought by the leader of the Protestant Army, François de Bonne, duc de Lesdiguières.

From 1604 till 1619 the Duke, who became a Peer and the last Grand Constable of France, had his castle built to highlight his important role in the French court. The castle is surrounded by a wall of seven kilometers in length.

=== The Château in the French Revolution ===
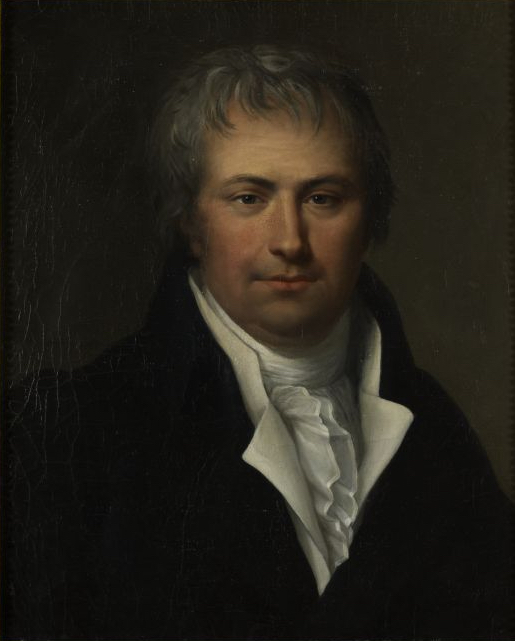
Claude Perier

In 1780 the Duke of Villeroy, Gabriel Louis de Neufville, sold the Chateau de Vizille and areas around it to Claude Perier for approximately 1,0254,000 livres. About a decade later, Claude had over 400 workers at the Château creating printed cotton. This building would end up playing an important role in the beginning of the French Revolution.

May 1788 King Louis XVI decided to set a boundary on the amount of power of the Parliament of Dauphiné in Grenoble. The Parliament openly expressed how dissatisfied they were with this decision and on June 7, 1788, they were not allowed to meet together. In return, the inhabitants of Grenoble threw tiles from the roofs onto the King's Guard. This event is known as "Tile Day" or "Day of the Tiles" in Grenoble.

In July, Claude Perier, inspired by all of the Liberal ideas around him, invited delegates from the Clergy, the Nobility and the Third-Estate, to assemble the meeting, which had been previously prohibited in Grenoble, in the room of the Jeu de Paume of the castle. Almost 500 men gathered that day at the banquet hosted by Claude Périer. In attendance there were many "notables" including churchmen, businessmen, doctors, notaries, municipal officials, lawyers, and landed nobility. This event is known as the Assembly of Vizille.

Demanded at this meeting: the Convocation in Paris of the Estates-General, where the Third Estate has double representation and where votes are by head, not by order. This meeting marked the first portion of the French Revolution. It also allowed Claude Périer and most of his family to live through the tough periods of the French Revolution without harm.

=== The Château as a Monument ===
One of the owners Adolphe-Joseph-Scipion Perier, son of Augustin Perier was married to a granddaughter of General Lafayette.

The Perier family owned it until 1895, during which time the castle itself was made a monument historique in 1862.

In 1924 the castle became the property of the French State and in 1973 the castle was given by the French government to the Community Council of Isere.

== The Park ==
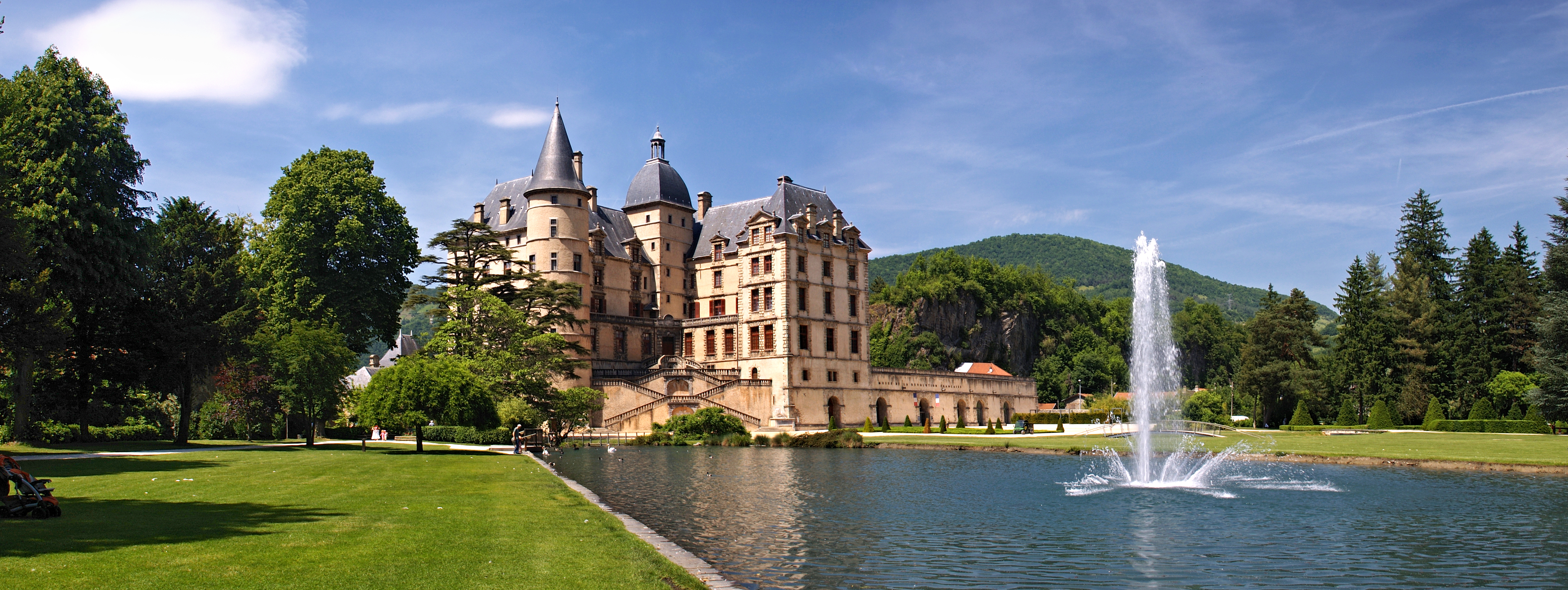
Panorama with parc

The castle park has a total of 130 hectares (320 acres) of space, and is the most popular site in the Isère department with 804,511 visitors in 2008.

The park was classified as a historic monument on 23 August 1991. The design of the park dates from the 19th century.
