= Camille Teisseire =

French politician and businessman

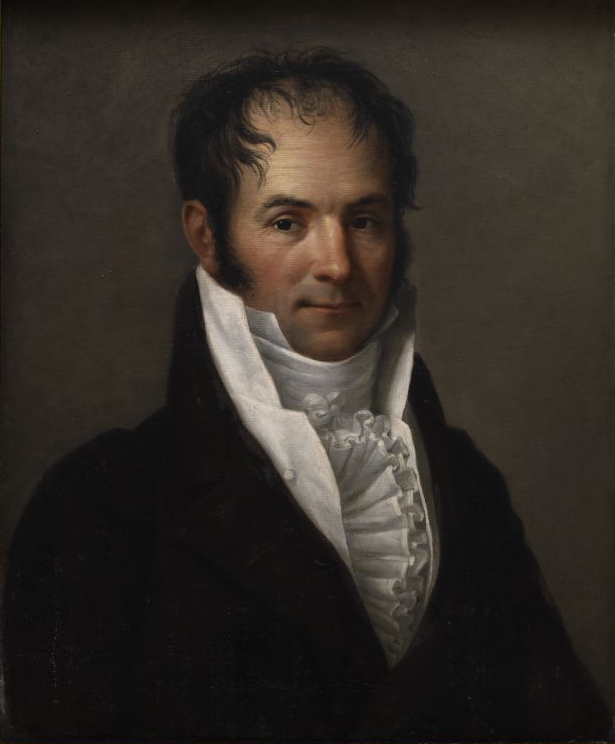
- Portrait by Jean-Baptiste François Desoria
- Born: Hyacinthe Camille Teisseire; 22 September 1764; Grenoble, France
- Died: 12 September 1842 (aged 77); Grenoble, France
- Occupation(s): Politician, businessman

Hyacinthe Camille Teisseire (22 September 1764 – 12 September 1842) was a French politician and businessman prominent in the civic and industrial life of Grenoble, the city of his birth, during the first half of the 19th century. He was the nephew of the future minister Cretet. He passed into the administration as subprefect of Tournon before serving, from 1820 until 1824 as a representative for Isère in the French Chamber of Deputies. He was a Chevalier de la Légion d'honneur and a member of the Académie delphinale. As a businessman he ran the distilling company Teisseire which had been founded by his grandfather in 1720 and was famous for its cherry liqueur Ratafia de Teisseire.

In 1794 Camille married Marine Périer, the daughter of the French banker and industrialist Claude Perier. The couple had ten children, not all of whom survived to adulthood.

When Teisseire took up his seat in the Chamber of Deputies in 1820, he turned the management of the distilling business over to his eldest son Charles, and the company became known for a period as Teisseire, Père & Fils (Teisseire, Father & Son).

In 1825, his daughter Antoinette-Marie-Henriette Teisseire married the engineer and metallurgist Achille Chaper.

Camille Teisseire died in Grenoble at the age of 77 and is buried in the Saint Roch Cemetery.
