= Jean Louis Boigues =

French industrialist and politician

Deputy for Nièvre
- In office 21 April 1828 – 16 May 1830

Deputy for Nièvre
- In office 23 June 1830 – 14 November 1838

Personal details
- Born: 25 April 1784 Lascelle, Cantal, France
- Died: 14 November 1838 (aged 54) Fourchambault, Nièvre, France
- Occupation: Industrialist and politician

Jean Louis Boigues (25 April 1784 – 14 November 1838) was a French industrialist and politician.

== Family ==
Jean Louis Boigues was born on 25 April 1784 in Lascelle, Cantal. The Boigues family seems to have moved from Catalonia to France in the 17th century. His parents were Pierre Boigues (1755–1820) and Catherine Brousse (1764–1848). His father was a rich Parisian iron merchant. (Note: His father advertised as: "Boygues, Cour Saint-Louis, Faubourg Saint-Antoine, n° 26. Sell and buy old iron, lead, copper, tin, bell metal and whole bells".) His family married into newly wealthy aristocratic families. Marie Boigues, sister of Louis Boigues, married Count Hippolyte Jaubert. Jaubert was the nephew and adopted son of Francois Jaubert, a wealthy and powerful regent of the Bank of France. Another sister, Gabrielle Boigues (1788–1855), married Claude Hochet on 5 September 1807, when Hochet was secretary of the Contentious Affairs Committee. In July 1825 Louis Boigues married Claudine Françoise Montanier (1785–1864).

== Iron master ==
Boigues became an iron merchant and army contractor based in Paris. He collaborated with the engineer Georges Dufaud, who had studied metallurgy in Wales and in 1818 set up a forge using Welsh techniques at Trézy in the Nivernais. Dufaud was the son of an Ancien Régime ironmaster and a pioneer of ironmaking using coal. Boigues supplied the money and commercial connections. Boigues bought the forge in 1820 and moved it to Fourchambault on the Loire below Nevers. The Fourchambault ironworks used coke-blast smelting process. Dufaud continued to manage the forge. Their plan was to combine the new approach to refining iron using coal with the more conventional approach using charcoal practiced in Berry.

Over the ensuing 15 years Boiges, Dufaud and their partners developed Fourchambault into a major center of metallurgy. They bought ten blast furnaces in the region around Fourchambault and existing ironworks that included a sheet metal plant at Imphy and a nail factory at Cosne. Émile Martin, Dufaud's son-in-law, built a foundry near the Fourchambault forge. In the 1820s the Boigues and other partners in Fourchambault such as Dufaud and Martin were heavily involved in promoting railways.

In 1836 the brothers Adolphe and Eugène Schneider acquired the iron works at Le Creusot with investments by François Alexandre Seillière and Louis Boigues. Adolphe had married Valerie Aignan, stepdaughter of Louis Boigues. When Boigues died in 1838 the Fourchambault enterprise was reorganized as a societé en commandite, a limited partnership controlled by the heirs of Boigues and Dufaud. The Société Boigues & Cie soon began a major expansion to meet growing demand from railways. Claude Hochet's son Jules Hochet became manager of the iron foundry of the Société Boigues & Cie.

== Deputy ==
Boigues was a knight of the Legion of Honour when he ran for election to the legislature in 1828. He was deputy from 21 April 1828 to 16 May 1830 for the Nièvre department as candidate of the Liberal opposition. He sat in the left center, defended the Charter and voted against the ministry of Jules de Polignac. Under the July Monarchy he was elected deputy for Nièvre on 23 June 1830 and sat with the center left. He was reelected on 5 July 1831, 21 June 1834 and 4 November 1837, sitting with the government majority. He took part in the condemnation of the La Tribune newspaper.

Jean Louis Boigues died on 14 November 1838 in Fourchambault, Nièvre.

== Sources ==
- D'Angio, Agnès (2006). "The industrial and financial use of patents by Schneider et Cie". Transferts de technologies en Méditerranée. Presses Paris Sorbonne. ISBN 978-2-84050-374-3.
- Derrien, Cédric, "Prosper HOCHET", Geneanet
- Doyon, André; Parc, Yves Du (1972), De Mélanie à Lamiel: ou, D'un amour d'Henri Beyle au roman de Stendahal, Librairie Droz, ISBN 978-2-600-04335-9
- Landes, David S. (1999-05-17), The Wealth and Poverty of Nations: Why Some Are So Rich and Some So Poor, W. W. Norton, ISBN 978-0-393-06981-5
- Jean-Louis Boigues (in French), Assemblée nationale
- Pierfit, Louis BOIGUES (in French)
- Robert, Adolphe; Cougny, Gaston (1889), "Boigues (Jean-Louis)", Dictionnaire des parlementaires français de 1789 à 1889 (in French)
- Smith, Michael Stephen (2006), The Emergence of Modern Business Enterprise in France, 1800-1930, Harvard University Press, ISBN 978-0-674-01939-3
