= Hochet =

Hochet may refer to:

== People ==
- Claude Hochet (1772–1857), French journalist and civil servant
- Jules Hochet (1813–67), French industrialist
- Prosper Hochet (1810–83), French lawyer and civil servant
- Ric Hochet, fictional hero of a Franco-Belgian comics series

== Other ==
- Hochet, a type of Rattle (percussion instrument)
- Le Hochet, a village located in the Pamplemousses District of Mauritius
