= Société Boigues & Cie =

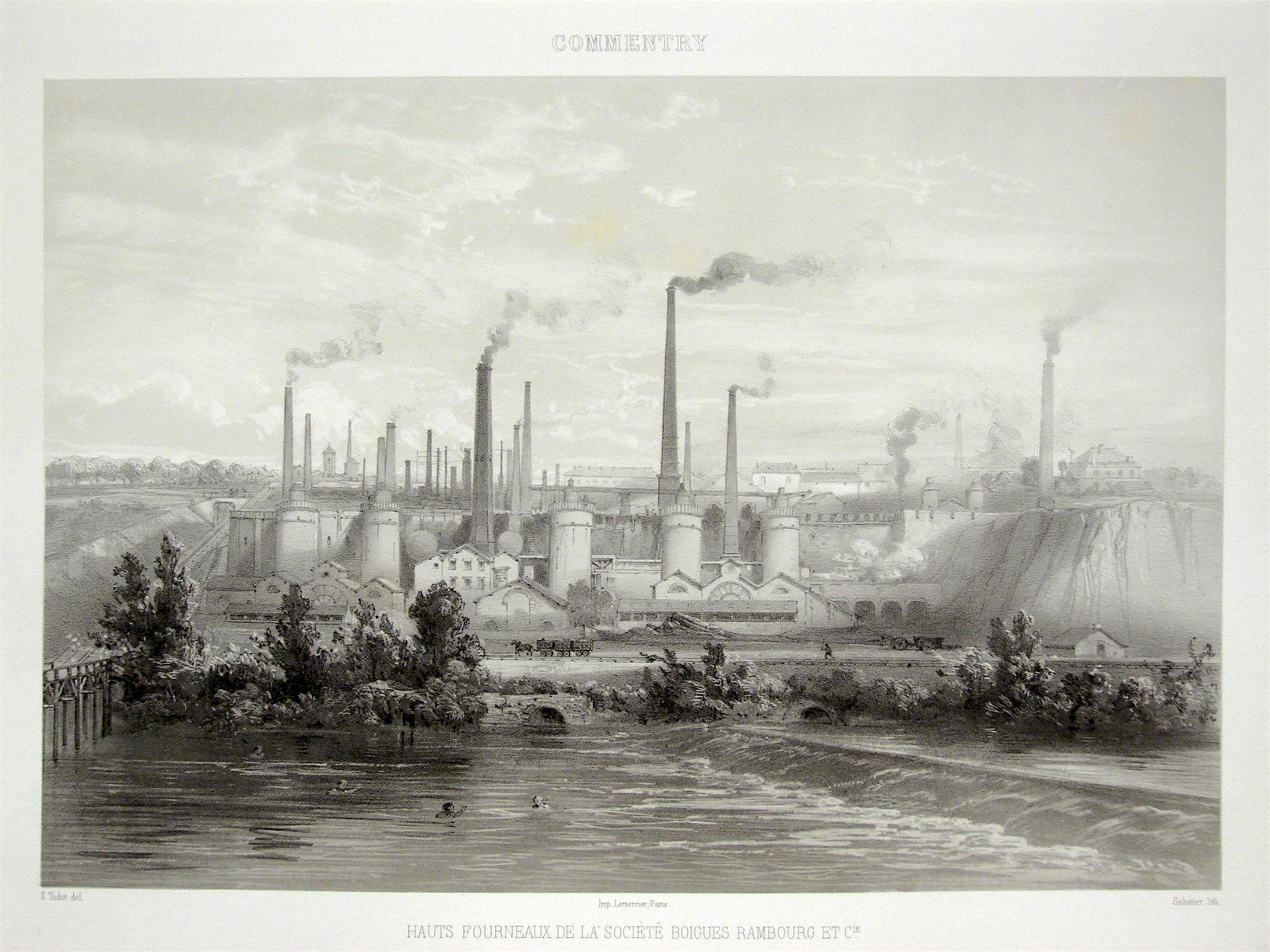
- Blast furnaces at Commentry in 1856
- Industry: Iron
- Founded: 1820
- Founders: Jean Louis Boigues and Guillaume Boigues
- Defunct: December 17, 1853
- Fate: Merged
- Headquarters: Paris, France

The Société Boigues & Cie (originally Boigues et fils) was a French ironmaking company based in Fourchambault, Nièvre, founded by a Parisian metal trader. Boigues et fils built a foundry at Fourchambault, Nièvre in 1821–22, the first in France to use the modern English technique of making iron using coal (coke) rather than charcoal. The company became a limited partnership, Société Boigues & Cie, in 1839 after the death of the co-founder Jean Louis Boigues. In 1853 it merged with other companies to form what would be later named the Société de Commentry, Fourchambault et Decazeville

== Origins ==
Pierre Bouygues (1755–1820) had a business in Paris during the Directory and Empire that bought and sold old iron, lead, copper, pewter, bell metal and whole bells. He married Catherine Brousse (1764–1848). Their surviving children were Louis Boigues (1784–1838), Gabrielle Boigues (1788–1855) who married Claude Hochet and was mother of Prosper Hochet, Raymond Bouyges (born 1791), Bertrand (Meillard) Boiges (1794–1845), Guillaume Émile Boigues (1805–85) and Marie Boigues (c. 1808–1864) who married Count Hippolyte François Jaubert. At the start of the 19th century Bouygues (Note: Thuillier (1974) gives "Guillaume Boigues" as the founder of the enterprise. This disagrees with other sources which give Pierre Bougues as the founder.) was a trader in iron and copper in Paris, and around 1804 bought a property in Nivernais.

In 1817 the Maison Paillot Père et Fils and a M. Labbé asked Jean-Georges Dufaud Père, the director of their Grossouvre, Cher, foundry, to visit England to purchase iron. Dufaud was the son of an Ancien Régime ironmaster. Dufaud bought 15,000-20,000 tons of iron. While in Wales he discovered the technical specifications of an English-style forge he wanted to install in France. The forge at Trézy near Grossouvre was operational in 1817 using the new coal-based technology and its first products were sold at the start of 1818. In 1819 the leases on the Grossouvre site and its facilities were assigned to Boigues et Fils, Paris iron merchants, and Labbé. They decided to find a new site on the Loire to which it would be easier to transport coal, and decided on Fourchambault in Nièvre.

== Boigues et fils ==
Location in France

Boigues's son Jean Louis Boigues (1780–1838) arranged for Dufaud to install a large English-style forge at Fourchambault. Their plan was to combine the new approach to refining iron using coal with the more conventional approach using charcoal practiced in Berry. A dock was built for cargo boats, and the Loire provided water for the steam engines. The forge at Trézy was transferred to Fourchambault on the Loire below Nevers and installed in extensive new facilities in 1821–22. The Charbonnières Raveaux and Cramain furnaces became annexes to the new building, and Boigues & Fils found several furnaces from the Nivernais and Berry to feed pig iron to the cast iron forge.

The move brought the forge closer to supplies of raw materials. Manufacturing began in 1822. Almost 3,000 workers from the surrounding countryside were employed in the cast iron foundry. The ironworks used the coke-blast smelting process. It produced large quantities of high quality iron. The plant at Fourchambault employed workers from England and Wales, and soon reached annual output of 5,000 to 6,000 tons with 4,000 workers. In 1824 Georges Dufaud passed direction of the forge to his son Achille. His son-in-law Émile Martin also played an important technical role in the enterprise.

By 1824 the Boiges's had eliminated Paillot and Labbé and made an agreement that divided ownership 1/8 to the Maison de Paris, which handed the accounts of all the factories of Boigues et fils in Fouchambault, with the remaining 7/8 divided 3/4 to Louis Boigues in Paris and 1/4 to Meillard-Bouges, his brother, who worked as an administrator in Fourchambault. Dufaud continued to manage the forge. Louis Bourges was also a founder of a factory at Imphy, Nièvre, and was one of the main owners of a factory at Janon, Loire.

Over the ensuing years Boiges, Dufaud and their partners developed Fourchambault into a major center of metallurgy. At the 1827 Exposition des produits de l'industrie française in Paris Boigues et fils were given an honorable mention for their cast iron. It was noted that they were the first to use coal, a plentiful mineral, while there were limited resources of wood. In the category of metallurgical arts they won a gold medal. They bought ten blast furnaces in the region around Fourchambault and existing ironworks that included a sheet metal plant at Imphy and a nail factory at Cosne. Émile Martin, Dufaud's son-in-law, built a foundry near the Fourchambault forge. In the 1820s the Boigues and other partners in Fourchambault such as Dufaud and Martin were heavily involved in promoting railways.

In 1836 the brothers Adolphe and Eugène Schneider acquired the iron works at Le Creusot with investments by François Alexandre Seillière and Louis Boigues. Adolphe had married Valerie Aignan, stepdaughter of Louis Boigues. (Note: Claudine Françoise Montanier (1785-1864) married Etienne Aignan (1773-1824) and had three children including Valérie Aignan (1812-1861), who married Adolphe Schneider, founded of the Société Schneider et Cie. Claudine Françoise remarried in 1825 to Louis Boigues.) In 1838 Boigues et fils engaged with the Société Rambourg Frères, owner of a coal mine in Commentry, Allier.

An 1839 description of the works at Fourchambault said the raw iron to be refined was supplied by 18 blast furnaces, five of which were operated by the Boigues company in Nièvre and five in Cher. One of the furnaces used coke for fuel in the English way. Three of the blast furnaces had bellows driven by steam engines, and at Charbonnière a steam engine was used as back-up when the water supply failed. 16 furnaces at Fourchambault were used for refining the iron, and six others were used to heat the refined iron to be stretched into bars for sale. All the iron work was done by rolling mills according to the dimensions of the iron bars required. Two steam engines, each of 60 horsepower, provided power to the various rolling mills. The factory at Fourchambault employed about 3,000 workers including those involved in harvesting wood for fuel. A suspension bridge was being built across the Loire to connect Fourchambault in Nièvre to Givry in Cher, due to be completed in 1835.

== Société Boigues & Cie ==
Jean Louis Boigues died on 14 November 1838 in Fourchambault, Nièvre. After his death the Fourchambault enterprise was reorganized as a societé en commandite, a limited partnership controlled by the heirs of Boigues and Dufaud. The Société Boigues & Cie soon began a major expansion to meet growing demand from railways. Claude Hochet was the brother-in-law of Jean Louis Boigues. His son Jules Hochet became manager of the iron foundry of the Société Boigues & Cie.

In 1846 Hochet, iron master at Fourchambault, became a member of the Association pour la défense du Travail national. This had been formed to oppose the lowering of tariffs. In the crisis year of 1848 Charles de Wendel and Eugène Schneider saved the foundry at Fourchambault from bankruptcy by co-signing a huge bank loan. The law of 1 December 1851 authorized formation of the Chemin de fer de Lyon à Avignon, owned by Genissieu, Boigues & Cie, Emile Martin & Cie, Edouard Blount, Parent (Bazile), and Drouillard Benoist & Cie.

The Société Boigues, Rambourg & Cie was created in 1852 and reorganized on 1 January 1854. The gerants were P. Benoist d'Azy, Em. Boiges, J. Hochet, Mouy and P. Rambourg. On 17 December 1853 the Société Boigues & Cie and the Société Rambourg Frères, which owned the Commentry mine, merged with other enterprises to form the Société Boigues, Rambourg & Cie. The company, later renamed the Société de Commentry, Fourchambault et Decazeville was formed in 1853 through a merger of the Fourchambault foundry, Imphy (Nièvre) steelworks, Montluçon (Allier) foundry and Commentry (Allier) colliery. The new company was dominated by the Boigues family for the steel plants at Fourchambault, Toteron and La Guerche and the Rambourg family for the Commentary mine. The owners of Montluçon, Imphy and La Pique were in the minority.

== Sources ==
- Birieux, A. F. de, ed. (1857), Annuaire de la bourse et de la banque guide universel des capitalistes et des actionnaire par une société de jurisconsultes et de financiers (in French), Administration de l'annuaire
- "CCLXXXIII n. 7393", Collection complète des lois, décrets, ordonnances, réglements, et avis du Conseil d'Etat / J. B. Duvergier (in French), Paris: A. Guyot et Scribe, 1852
- D'Angio, Agnès (2006). "The industrial and financial use of patents by Schneider et Cie". Transferts de technologies en Méditerranée. Presses Paris Sorbonne. ISBN 978-2-84050-374-3.
- Dassé, Pauline (2006), Société de Commentry, Fourchambault et Decazeville (59 Aq Et 1996 064 - 36 Mi) Inventaire Des Archives Photographiques (PDF) (in French), Centre Des Archives du Monde du Travail
- Derrien, Cédric, "Jules Louis HOCHET", Geneanet
- Firmin-Didot frères (1839), Panorama pittoresque de la France ...: les principales villes, les ports de mer, les établissements d'eaux minérales et les chateaux pittoresques, les édifices, monuments, sites remarquables, etc. ... (in French), Aux bureaux de la Cie. bibliopéene
- Gille, Bertrand (1968), La Sidérurgie française au XIXe siècle: Recherches histioriques (in French), Librairie Droz, ISBN 978-2-600-04046-4
- Jean-Louis Boigues (in French), Assemblée nationale
- Jury Central (1828), Rapport du Jury Central sur les Produits de l'Industrie Française (in French), Fain et Thunot
- La société des frères Boigues et son évolution, causes et conséquences (PDF) (in French), Académie de Dijon
- Landes, David S. (1999-05-17), The Wealth and Poverty of Nations: Why Some Are So Rich and Some So Poor, W. W. Norton, ISBN 978-0-393-06981-5
- Nesly, Bernard (27 September 2015), Jetons d'usine et d'outillage – Fourchambault (Nièvre) – Fonderies Magnard et Cie (in French)
- Pierfit, Louis BOIGUES (in French)
- Priouret, Roger (1992-02-04), Origines du patronat français, Grasset, ISBN 978-2-246-79486-8
- Smith, Michael Stephen (2006), The Emergence of Modern Business Enterprise in France, 1800-1930, Harvard University Press, ISBN 978-0-674-01939-3
- "Société de Commentry - Fourchambault", industrie.lu (in French)
- Thuillier, André (1974-01-01), Économie et société nivernaises au début du XIXe siècle (in French), Walter de Gruyter, ISBN 978-3-11-133027-3
