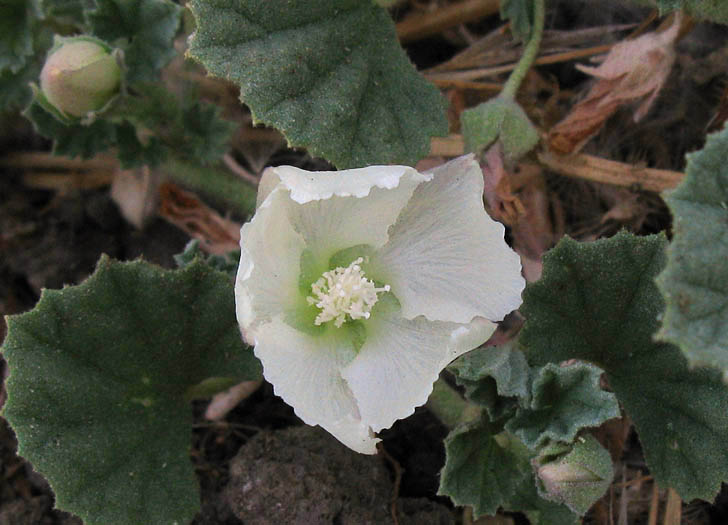
- Malvella leprosa

Scientific classification
- Kingdom: Plantae
- Clade: Tracheophytes
- Clade: Angiosperms
- Clade: Eudicots
- Clade: Rosids
- Order: Malvales
- Family: Malvaceae
- Subfamily: Malvoideae
- Tribe: Malveae
- Genus: Malvella; Jaub. & Spach

Species
- Four; see text

Synonyms
- Disella Greene

= Malvella =

Genus of flowering plants

Malvella is a small genus of flowering plants in the mallow family, Malvaceae. There are four species, one native to the Mediterranean, and three native to the southwestern United States and Mexico. The plants were formerly classified in genus Sida.

== Description ==
These are generally perennial herbs, sometimes annual, growing in a prostrate or decumbent form. They are coated with star-shaped or scaly hairs. The silvery-haired leaves have asymmetrical blades. Flowers grow singly in the leaf axils. They are whitish or yellow, fading pink. The fruit is a capsule with 7 to 10 segments that do not break apart.

== Species ==
Four species are accepted.

- Malvella lepidota (A.Gray) Fryxell – scurfy mallow
- Malvella leprosa (Ortega) Krapov. – alkali mallow
- Malvella sagittifolia (A.Gray) Fryxell – arrowleaf mallow
- Malvella sherardiana (L.) Jaub. & Spach
