= Claude Hochet =

French journalist, author and civil servant

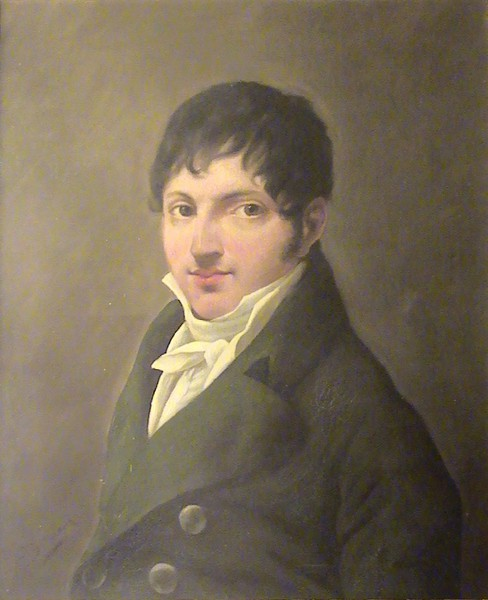

Secretary-General of the Conseil d'État
- In office 1816 – 12 March 1839
- Succeeded by: Prosper Hochet

Personal details
- Born: Claude Jean-Baptiste Hochet; 24 November 1772 Paris, France
- Died: 3 October 1857 (aged 84) Château de la Thibaudière, Montreuil-Juigné, Maine et Loire, France
- Occupation: Journalist, civil servant, iron master

Claude Hochet (24 November 1772 – 3 October 1857) was a French journalist, author and civil servant who was secretary-general of the Conseil d'État from 1816 to 1839. He is best known as a friend of Madame de Staël, Benjamin Constant, Abel-François Villemain and Prosper de Barante. Their letters to him have been preserved, and are a valuable record of the intellectual life of the First French Empire.

== Early years ==
Claude Hochet was born in Paris on 24 November 1772 in the rue du Faubourg-Saint-Honoré, parish of Sainte-Marie-Madeleine. His parents were Claude Thomas Hochet (1735–1807), a Paris spice merchant, and Marie Elisabeth Révérard (died 1807). He had four sisters.

== French Revolution (1789–99) ==
During the French Revolution Hochet joined the army during the mass conscription decreed by the National Convention. On 4 November 1793 he left Paris with his battalion to fight the Chouans at Coutances. When the troops reached Carentan they mutinied and made for Cherbourg. Hochet was one of four officers who were arrested. They were imprisoned in turn in Avranches, Dol, Rennes and then Arras, where they spent several months. They were released after the Thermidorian Reaction of 27 July 1794. For a short time Hochet was Secretary of the Council of Commerce, which was under the Committee of Public Safety. He then began a career as a journalist, and was one of the first contributors to Jean-Baptiste-Antoine Suard's Le Publiciste, where he was a drama critic. He translated Niccolò Machiavelli's The Art of War, edited the letters of Émilie du Châtelet, and wrote a brochure about the Council of State.

== Napoleonic era (1799–1814) ==
After his release from prison and return to Paris in 1794 Hochet wrote Souvenirs de ma détention en 1793 (Memories of my detention in 1793). He said at the end of his life that he was glad to have written this work, not because of any literary merit, but because his very successful readings of the work were his first entry into the world, when he collected many illustrious friendships that were faithful to him during his long career. He seems to have been referring to the salons of Madame Amélie Suard at the end of 1799. He met Benjamin Constant and Madame de Staël at Madame Suard's salon in Paris, and would remain a friend and correspondent of Madame de Staël for the rest of her life. They each wrote about sixty letters to the other between 1800 and 1815. (Note: Jean Mistler published the letters to Hochet written to Hochet by Madame de Staël and Benjamin Constant as Lettres à un ami (1949).) Hochet also became a friend of Julie Talma, Madame Récamier and Prosper de Barante.

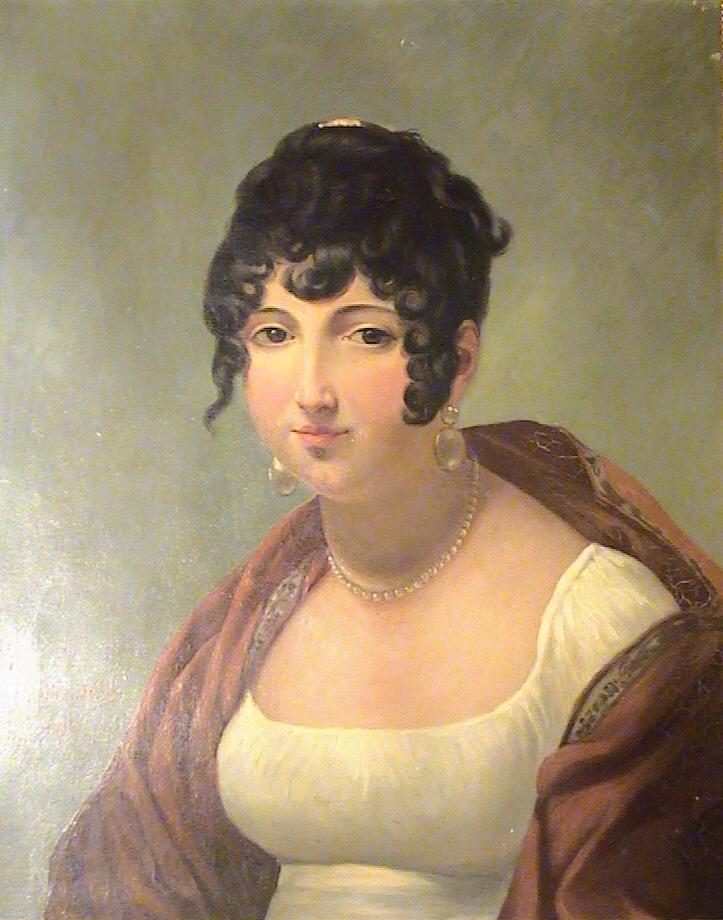
Gabrielle Boigues (1788–1855)

Hochet left Le Publiciste around 1805 to become chief clerk of the Interior section of the Council of State. He then became a secretary in the Department of the Interior. He was appointed a member of the Committee of the Legal Claims Department in 1806. On 5 September 1807, when he was secretary of the Contentious Affairs Committee, he married Gabrielle Boigues (1788–1855). She was the daughter of Pierre Boigues, a rich Parisian merchant, and Catherine Brousse. She brought a rich dowry of land, cash, jewels and two houses in Paris, and expected an inheritance from her father.

After his marriage Hochet lived very peacefully with his wife and children. Their first child was Claire, born on 1 July 1808. She died on 15 September 1821. Their eldest son Prosper Hochet was born in Paris on 26 April 1810 and their second son Jules Hochet was born on 17 mars 1813. (Note: Prosper Hochet (1810-) became a senior civil servant and was briefly a deputy during the July Monarchy. Jules Hochet became an administrator of the Chemin de fer de Lyon à la Méditerranée.) On 12 January 1814 Claude Hochet was elected Captain of the National Guard. He rallied to the Bourbons, and by royal order of 6 July 1814 was appointed secretary-clerk of the Committee of Litigation, then secretary of the Council of State.

== Later career (1814–57) ==
After the Bourbon Restoration Claude Hochet was made Secretary of the Council of State on 24 August 1815. On 14 May 1817 he acquired a 7 hectares (17 acres) estate in Clamart for 30,000 francs. It had two main lodges, stables, an aviary, meadows, vineyards, walks and ponds. In 1822, he was appointed as an Honorary State Counselor. Two more daughters were born, Louise (1818–86) and Gabrielle Claire (1823–93). His brother-in-law, Jean Louis Boigues (1784–1838) was the head of the ironworks at Fourchambault, Nièvre, which became a societé en commandite, a form of limited partnership, after his death. His son Jules Hochet became manager of the iron foundry of the Société Boigues & Cie.

Claude Hochet was made Master of Requests and honorary Councilor of State in 1822. He resigned from his offices in 1839 to make way for his son Prosper. Prosper Hochet replaced his father as Secretary General of the Council of State on 12 March 1839. Claude Hochet died on 3 October 1857 at the Château de la Thibaudière, Montreuil-Juigné, home of his daughter Mme Alfred de Mieulle. In his will he left his correspondence and manuscripts to his two surviving daughters. He said that the greater part of the letters were of Madame de Stael, Charles de Damas, MM. de Barante and Benjamin Constant. He was buried in the Père Lachaise Cemetery in Paris.

== Publications ==
- Claude Hochet (1794), Souvenirs de ma détention en 1793
- Niccolò Machiavelli (1799), Œuvres: Discours sur Tite-Live / Histoire de Florence / L'Art de la guerre / Correspondance / Légations, vol. 1–9, translated by Charles Philippe Toussaint Guiraudet and Claude Hochet, Paris: Pothey
- Claude Hochet, ed. (1806), Lettres Inédites de Madame la Marquise du Chastelet a M. le Comte d'Argental: Auxquelles on a Joint une Dissertation sur l'Existence de Dieu, Parsi: Chez Xhrouet

== Sources ==
- Derrien, Cédric, "Prosper HOCHET", Geneanet
- Doyon, André; Parc, Yves Du (1972), De Mélanie à Lamiel: ou, D'un amour d'Henri Beyle au roman de Stendahal, Librairie Droz, ISBN 978-2-600-04335-9
- Herold, J. Christopher (2002), Mistress to an Age: A Life of Madame de Staël, Grove Press, ISBN 978-0-8021-3837-8
- Mme de Staël : Selected Correspondence, translated by Jameson-Cemper, K., Springer Science & Business Media, 2012-12-06, ISBN 978-94-011-4283-0
- Lesur, M. C. L. (1841), Annuaire historique universel pour 1839 (in French), Imp. D'Ange Clo.
- Martin-Frugier, Anne (April–June 1989), "La formation des élites: les "conférences" sous la Restauration et la Monarchie de Juillet", Revue d'histoire moderne et contemporaine (in French), 36 (2), Societe d'Histoire Moderne et Contemporaine: 211–244, doi:10.3406/rhmc.1989.1491, JSTOR 20529584
- Pierfit, Louis BOIGUES (in French)
- Prosper Hochet (in French), Assemblée nationale
- Smith, Michael Stephen (2006), The Emergence of Modern Business Enterprise in France, 1800-1930, Harvard University Press, ISBN 978-0-674-01939-3
