= Malvella sherardiana =

Scientific classification
- Kingdom: Plantae
- Clade: Tracheophytes
- Clade: Angiosperms
- Clade: Eudicots
- Clade: Rosids
- Order: Malvales
- Family: Malvaceae
- Genus: Malvella
- Species: M. sherardiana

Binomial name
- Malvella sherardiana (L.) Jaub. & Spach

Synonyms
- Synonym list: Malva sherardiana L.; Sida sherardiana (L.) Benth.; Malva cymbalariifolia Desr.; Malva humifusa Salisb.; Malvella cymbalariifolia Boiss.

Species of flowering plant in the mallow family

Malvella sherardiana, or Sherard's malvella, is a perennial flowering plant in the mallow family (Malvaceae), native to Spain and from Greece to Crimea, southeastward to Iran. The species features many ground-spreading stems with round, long-stalked leaves up to 50 millimetres (2.0 in) wide with crinkly edges, and small, solitary pink mallow-like flowers measuring 10 millimetres (0.39 in) in diameter. It is the only Old World species in the genus Malvella, typically growing in fields and waste places on heavy clay soils at elevations between 0–1,000 metres (3,300 ft), where it faces conservation challenges, particularly in central Spain where it qualifies as endangered with fewer than 300 individuals remaining across fragmented populations.

== Description ==
The plant is a perennial found in fields and waste places (0–1000 m) consisting of many ground-spreading stems, with many round long-stalked leaves (to 50 mm wide) with crinkly edges and sizeable gap at base, and small long-stalked mallow-like solitary pink flowers (10 mm diam), each with five unnotched petals and many anthers. The fruit is a ring of many inflated segments. All parts are densely short-hairy with star-like (stellate) hairs.

The main veins of the leaves radiate from the leaf base to the edge, with secondary veins. The epicalyx at the base of the calyx is inconspicuous, composed of three small (1–2 mm) filamentous parts.

== Seed dormancy and germination ==
The seeds of Malvella sherardiana show a form of physiologicaldormancy caused by the mechanical resistance of their tough seed coat, rather than by impermeability to water or underdevelopment of the embryo. Under controlled laboratory conditions (constant temperatures of 10–25 °C (50–77 °F) and alternating regimes of 15/25–25/35 °C), fewer than 5% of untreated seeds germinated after 13 weeks, rising only to about 5% following a 24 h soak in gibberellic acid. Water‑imbibition trials showed that intact and scarified seeds absorb similar amounts of moisture (about 17–20 % increase in mass after 24–48 h), confirming that the dormancy is not due to a water‑impermeable coat.

By contrast, brief chemical scarification with concentrated sulfuric acid (H_{2}SO_{4}) markedly improved both germination percentage and speed: seeds treated for three hours in H_{2}SO_{4} and then soaked in gibberellic acid reached up to 77% germination and reduced mean germination time to around four days. Mechanical tests found that an average force of about 58.8 N is required to fracture the seed coat, underscoring its role as a physical barrier to radicle (first root) emergence. These results suggest that simple acid‑scarification protocols could be adopted in ex situ conservation and ecological restoration programmes to enhance propagation success for this vulnerable species.

== Distribution ==
Malvella sherardiana occurs in Bulgaria, Cyprus, East Aegean Islands, Greece, Iran, Iraq, Crimea, Lebanon-Syria, North Caucasus, Palestine, Spain, Transcaucasus, and Turkey.

In Spain, all known wild populations of M. sherardiana occupy heavy, expansive clay soils (vertisols), typically in ruderal‑arvense or pastizal‑cardal communities subject to grazing and trampling. In the newly reported Toledo locality (Numancia de la Sagra, 560 m) plants grow on brown clays with a sparse herbaceous cover. Similar substrates and vegetation occur at all confirmed sites in Ávila, Madrid and Toledo.

== Conservation ==
Following IUCN criteria applied at the scale of central Spain (only five 10 km by 10 km UTM squares occupied and a sharp recent decline), the species would qualify as Endangered (EN) in Castilla–La Mancha. 2016 population estimates are roughly 250 individuals across all Madrid fragments and about 45 in Toledo. Legal protection is currently limited to Castile and León (Taxón de Atención Preferente); in Madrid and Castilla–La Mancha the species remains unprotected and faces imminent loss of urban‑ and infrastructure‑bound sites.
