= Calantica =

Calantica is the scientific name of two genera of organisms and may refer to:

- Calantica (crustacean), a genus of barnacles in the family Calanticidae
- Calantica (plant), a genus of plants in the family Salicaceae
