= Calantica grandiflora =

Conservation status
- Least Concern (IUCN 3.1)

Scientific classification
- Kingdom: Plantae
- Clade: Tracheophytes
- Clade: Angiosperms
- Clade: Eudicots
- Clade: Rosids
- Order: Malpighiales
- Family: Salicaceae
- Genus: Calantica
- Species: C. grandiflora

Binomial name
- Calantica grandiflora Jaub. ex Tul.

Species of flowering plant

Calantica grandiflora, colloquially known as Hazou-Ambou, is a species of flowering plant in the family Salicaceae.

The plant is endemic to the east coast of Madagascar, specifically within the provinces of Antananarivo, Antsiranana, Fianarantsoa, and Toamasina. It grows in remnants of littoral forest or rarely subcoastal forest, usually on sand near sea level, but its upper elevation limit is 1,023 m (3,356 ft). It can also be found rarely in humid forests.

Calantica grandiflora is used in construction or fencing.

== Description ==
Calantica grandiflora is a tree reaching a height of 3–12 m (9.8–39.4 ft). It is characterized by thin, smooth branches. The mature branches are glabrous with white spots, while the younger branches are abundantly covered in sordid yellow. The leaves are arranged alternately and are obovate to oblong-lanceolate in shape, measuring 5–8 cm (2.0–3.1 in) in length and 2–3 cm (0.79–1.18 in) in width. They are obtusely acuminate with a shortly wedged base. The leaf margins are generally entire, although they can be partially or entirely obtusely and coarsely crenate-serrate, with small punctiform glands at the back. Initially, the leaves have a tomentella on the ribs and veins on the underside, but they soon become glabrous and shiny, with slender veins protruding posteriorly. The petiole is 2–3 mm (0.079–0.118 in) long, starting off silky-yellow and eventually becoming glabrous. The stipules are linear, short, and juxta-axillary, and they soon fall off. The panicle is isolated, either axillary or terminal, and erect, measuring 5–10 cm (2.0–3.9 in) in length. It is loosely branched, often appearing racemiform, and always very loose-flowered. The axis, along with the short, generally cymose three-flowered arms and their pedicels, is slender and yellow-tomentose. The bracts are linear-lanceolate, sharp, yellow-tomentose, open-erect, and quickly deciduous. The flowers are large, with each pedicel measuring 3–5 mm (0.12–0.20 in) and having a long, articulated base. Before unfolding, the flowers take on an ovate-acute form. The calyx, measuring 6–8 mm (0.24–0.31 in) long, is broadly cup-shaped and formed of a thin membrane. The entire external wall is covered with yellow hairs, which partially sheds with age. The calyx is split high and has narrowly triangular parts that are very thin, with densely clothed white silky hair anteriorly, and are very open at anthesis. The petals, if they can be called such, number 6–8 and are narrowly spathulate or linguiform, sharp, white-silky on both sides, and interposed by longer sepals. They originate from the mouth of the calyx, along with the penetrals, forming a fleshy glabrous disk. The glandules, which are as many as the sepals, are subtriangular with a regularly truncated base, thick, and glabrous. They replace the bottom of the calyx with a continuous cup, with the sepals almost entirely attached above the base. The stamens, numbering 6–8, arise from the wall of the calyx about the middle and are very glabrous. They arise individually before the sepals, remain shorter than them, and have filaments from the base line. The anthers are shortly elliptic, obtuse on both sides, emarginate at the base, attached to the back in the middle by a high stabbing, versatile, 2-lobed, and dehiscing outwards along their entire length. The ovary is globose, sessile, completely free, and very glabrous, with 4–6 crowded, rigid, and linear styles. The unilocular ovary is glabrous on all sides, with innumerable anatropous ovules that are pendulous or subhorizontal. The placentas, numbering 4–6, are parietal and barely prominent, fostering a multiple series of heredity. The capsule is ovate-acute, 4–6 sided, and sometimes not longer than the dry calyx, occasionally exceeding 1 cm (0.39 in) in length. It splits loculicidally into 4–6 hollow and semi-fermented valves, from the top to the base, and is widely dehiscent. The seeds are globose-ovate, clothed with a thin, crustaceous, and black-yellow covering. They have a short, claviform cord that is stiff and hairy, and are covered with very long, silky, whitish hairs with a yellow base. The straight embryo, the length of the seed, consists of a long stalk of cotyledons and two broadly ovate-obtuse bases. It flowers and fruits in March and April.

== Taxonomy ==
Calantica grandiflora is likely to be closely related to Calantica cerasifolia, and potential hybrids are theorized to exist. It was first described by Hippolyte François Jaubert and Edmond Tulasne in 1857.

== Conservation status ==
Calantica grandiflora is listed as LC by the IUCN Red List, but ongoing threats make the population susceptible to further decline. Specifically it is threatened by habitat destruction caused by annual fire, logging, and shifting agriculture. Luckily it occurs in Bemarivo, Betampona, Makira, Mananara Nord, Masoala, and Nosy Mangabe, which are protected areas.
