= Bivinia =

Conservation status
- Least Concern (IUCN 3.1)

Scientific classification
- Kingdom: Plantae
- Clade: Tracheophytes
- Clade: Angiosperms
- Clade: Eudicots
- Clade: Rosids
- Order: Malpighiales
- Family: Salicaceae
- Subfamily: Salicoideae
- Tribe: Homalieae
- Genus: Bivinia; Jaub. ex Tul.
- Species: B. jalbertii

Binomial name
- Bivinia jalbertii Tul.

Genus of flowering plants

Bivinia is a genus of flowering plants in the family Salicaceae, sometimes included in Calantica. It contains a single species, Bivinia jalbertii, which is found in Kenya, Madagascar, Mozambique, Tanzania and Zimbabwe.
