= Mazières foundry plant, Bourges =

Ancient Foundry plant, 1846, Bourges, France

Usines Mazières
- Location within France
- Built: 1847
- Operated: 1854-2002
- Location: 121 rue de Mazières; Bourges, France
- Coordinates: 47°03′46″N 2°23′33″E
- Industry: Foundry
- Products: Cast metal elements
- Owner: Bourges city council
- Defunct: 2002

The Mazières foundry plant (French: Usines Mazières) was a metal casting plant established in the late 1840s in Bourges, France. The company, set up by Marquis Léonce de Vogüé, thrived during the Industrial Revolution. Furthermore, de Vogüé developped an entire housing estate in the area where he lived among his workers and their falilies. Metal products were sold in France, exported to Europe and South America.

After several changes of owners, the company abandoned cast iron production in the 1960s to focus exclusively on steel manufacturing. The dire competition in the 1980s-1990s hit heavily the firm: it eventually closed in 2008.

== Léonce de Vogüé ==
The Mazières plant was established by Marquis Léonce de Vogüé (1805-1877), a French politician and farmer.

He initially started a military career, entering at 16 in Louis XVIII’s Page Corps in Versailles. He took part in the 1823 Catalonia campaign and the French conquest of Algeria, but left the army following the July Revolution in 1830.

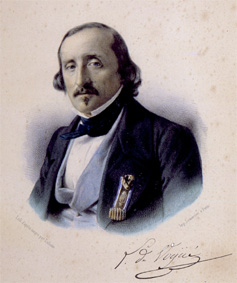
Léonce de Vogüé

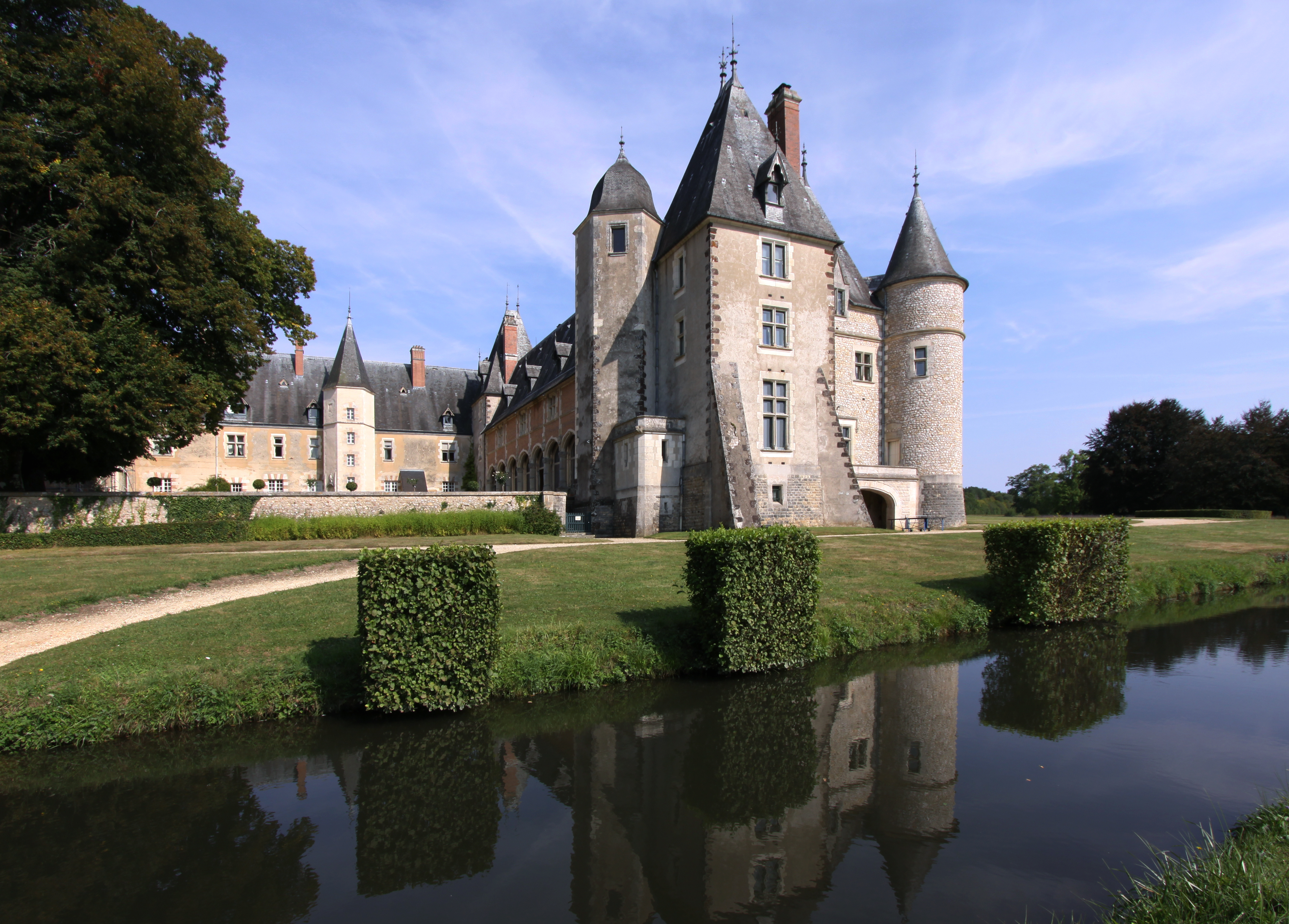
Château de la Verrerie

He subsequently retired to and managed his estates in the Berry region. At that time, Léonce de Vogüé inherited from his great-aunt properties in the Berry region, Burgundy, Bresse and Nivernais, making him a landlord of a vast landed area.

In autumn 1834, de Vogüé purchased an estate in the village of Ivoy-le-Pré, 30 kilometres (19 mi) north of Bourges, which comprised 3700 acres of woodland and an iron forge. Facing the impossibility to expand the forging facility in order to provide heavy equipment for the booming railway industry, Léonce set up a plant in 1846, on a large farm land called Le Petit Mazières, near Bourges.

de Vogüé was engaged in the local political life, being elected in the local assembly of the Cher department from 1839 to 1871. He was the owner of several castles in France, such as the Château de la Verrerie, the Château de Vogüé or the Château de Rochecolombe.

== Foundry plant history ==
=== Thriving beginnings ===
The foundry ("Usine") in the south of Bourges, 1897 map

On October 1846, Léonce de Vogüé decided upon the location of his future manufacture, Mazières, influenced by:

- the extensive area of available land, south of Bourges, along the road to Saint-Amand-Montrond;
- the proximity of the Berry Canal which opened to shipping on 3 October 1843. Its use made it easy to ferry raw material and manufactured items;
- the railway network extension that reached the city of Bourges on 19 July 1847. Thanks to this, the manufacture could connect directly with Paris. Though the main train line avoided the area, a secondary one, put into operation in 1888 and leading to Dun-sur-Auron, had a stop at the factory.

A year later, Léonce ordered the construction in Mazières of two blast furnaces, along with workshops and storage buildings.

French president Louis Napoléon Bonaparte granted approval on 6 June 1850, to the Marquis de Voguë to build an ironworks on the ancient property of Mazières. This modern establishment abandoned wood and hydraulic power to be fueled by coke and steam power.

On 25 July 1857, the municipality and the Marquis de Vogüé agreed upon the construction of a street leading to the factory-to-be, today's Rue de Mazières. The works were funded equally by both parties over a length of more than 1 kilometre (0.62 mi). de Vogüé secured an agreement for the simultaneous construction of seven side-streets to accommodate new housing developments for workers.

The growing success of the manufacture relied on the need of large metal framework articles associated with the Industrial Revolution. Its best seller items were railway turntables and swing bridges, sold throughout Europe. Other Mazières frameworks were sent to Paris, Marseille, Lyon. The foundry also exported abroad, to Europe and America.

=== 1870s ===
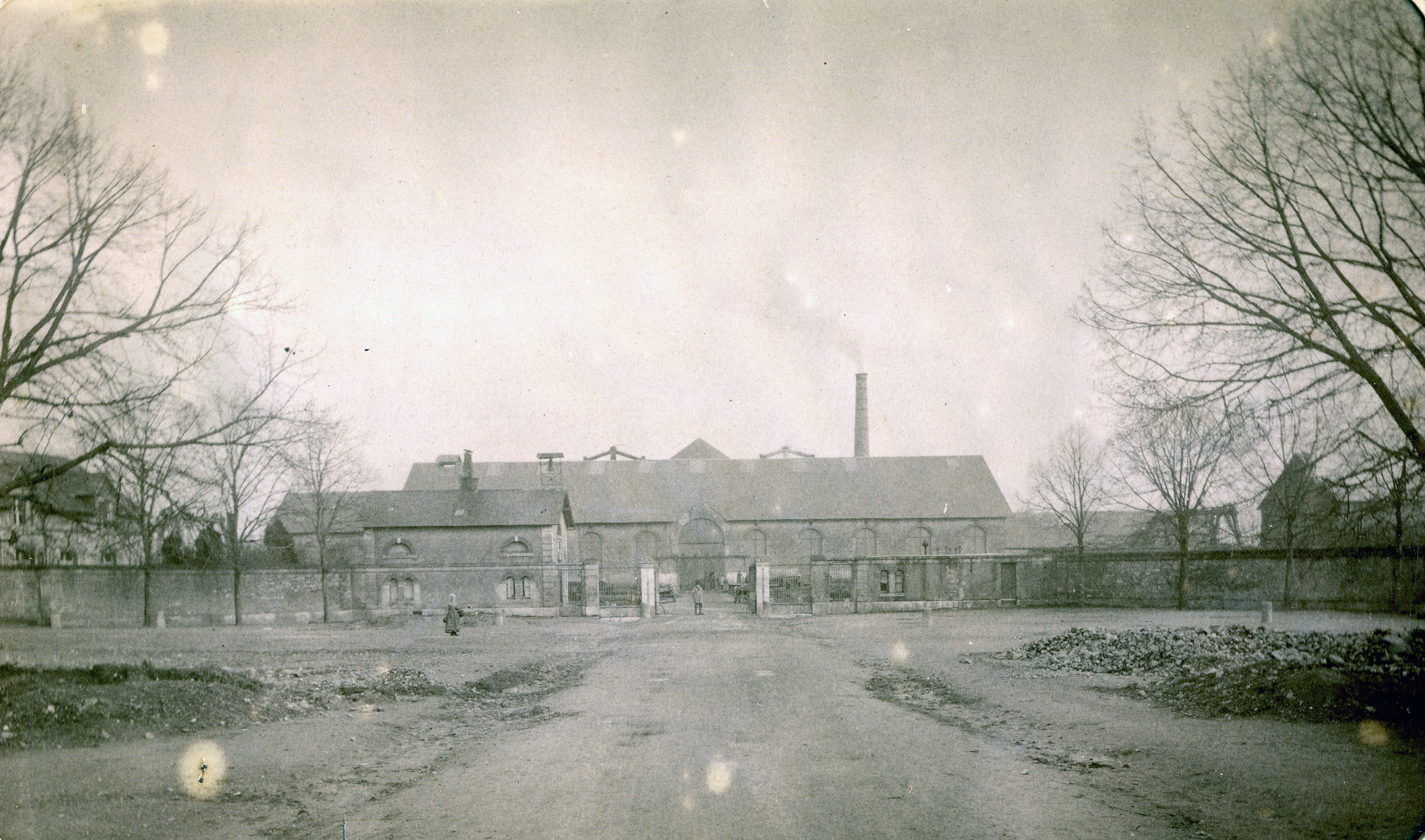
Main entrance of Mazières plant, 1887

In 1875, the Société des Usines de Mazières was turned into a public limited company (French: Société Anonyme). Its product range expanded to include cast-iron components for structural frameworks, bridges and elements for the maritime market. The company offered 50 types of turntables and 25 of swing bridges.

In 1913, an electrical power plant was built by Ernest Pantz's firm on an abutting stretch of land belonging to the Marquis de Voguë. The plant supplied energy to nearby military facilities and was located north of the foundry, between the Berry Canal, a local railway line and the Rampenne River. It operated at full capacity during the First World War. In 1916, two steam-powered units were added to the production, followed by five others in 1917 and 1918. After the end of the conflict, operations slackened and the site closed in the 1940s. The powerplant was nationalizationed in 1946 and its ownership moved to Électricité de France. In 2026, the premises are still decommissioned.

=== From WWI to WWII ===
During WWI, the manufacture shifted production to armaments, especially 75 inches (1,900 mm), 95 inches (2,400 mm) and 155 inches (3,900 mm) artillery shells.

A rail turntable in Lyon-Perrache

After the First World War, the lack of modern equipment combined with the poor investment capacity of de Vogüé owners signed the end of the family business. In 1931, the foundry was purchased by the Société de Commentry, Fourchambault et Decazeville. The new actor modernised the firm : in 1936, the company’s low-shaft furnaces and cupola furnaces were replaced by electric arc furnaces, enabling the production of special steels for the automotive industry and special high-temperature-resistant steel alloys.

At the start of WWII, the foundry turned back to artillery shells production, till the German occupation of the city in June 1940. From this moment, the company manufactured anew civilian equipment. In 1941, the Mazières plant was integrated into the Société de Commentry, Fourchambault et Decazeville.

=== Golden years (1945 to 1970s) ===
The Trente Glorieuses brought back the golden years of the foundry. As a part of the newly created Société Imphy (1954), it became an innovative firm producing, among others, nickel-steel alloys.

In 1968, the company was integrated into a new joint venture, the FASER (Fonderie d'Aciers Spéciaux et Réfractaires - English: Foundry for Special and Refractory Steels), created by American ABEX and French Creusot-Loire. This move made the Mazières site enter the vast Schneider industrial empire, owned by Belgium Empain group. Under this umbrella, substantial investments were realised, allowing the manufacturing of top of the line items, such as refractory steel tubes for the petrochemical industry or refractory steel components for furnaces and incinerators. In parallel, the company continued conventional manufacturing of raw materials for pumps and various machine tools.

At its heyday, the facility spanned 12 hectares (30 acres) and employed 350 people.

=== Decline years (1970s to 2010s) ===
The economic crisis triggered by the 1973 oil crisis heralded a slow decline.

In the late 1970s, the FASER company became a subsidiary of a new company called Société des Fonderies et Aciéries du Manoir or Manoir Industries based near Rouen. The activity of the Mazières site bounced up for a time, buoyed by manufacturing pipes for the booming oil and chemical industries. The local workforce grew in consequence. Later, the plant was bought by the Pompey group (Société des hauts fourneaux, forges et aciéries de Pompey).

In 1980, FASER became FAB (Fonderie des Aciers de Bourges - English: Bourges Steel Foundry), marking the beginning of a gradual decline in activity, translated into a series of restructuring and company name changes.

On 7 July 1992, an arson caused 20 million francs in damages.

As the operations dwindled, so the employment numbers, down to 180 by the year 2000.

In October 2002, the site was sold to Dellamare Industrie, based in Saint Etienne. The new owner could only preserve a very limited activity with 44 employees (in 2007): the remaining structures were repurposed as warehouses for tooling equipment. The Mazières plant eventually closed in January 2008.

All that remains of the industrial site is a portion of the southern perimeter wall and the gatehouse. The main buildings, director’s house and caretaker’s quarters, were demolished during the 1980s.

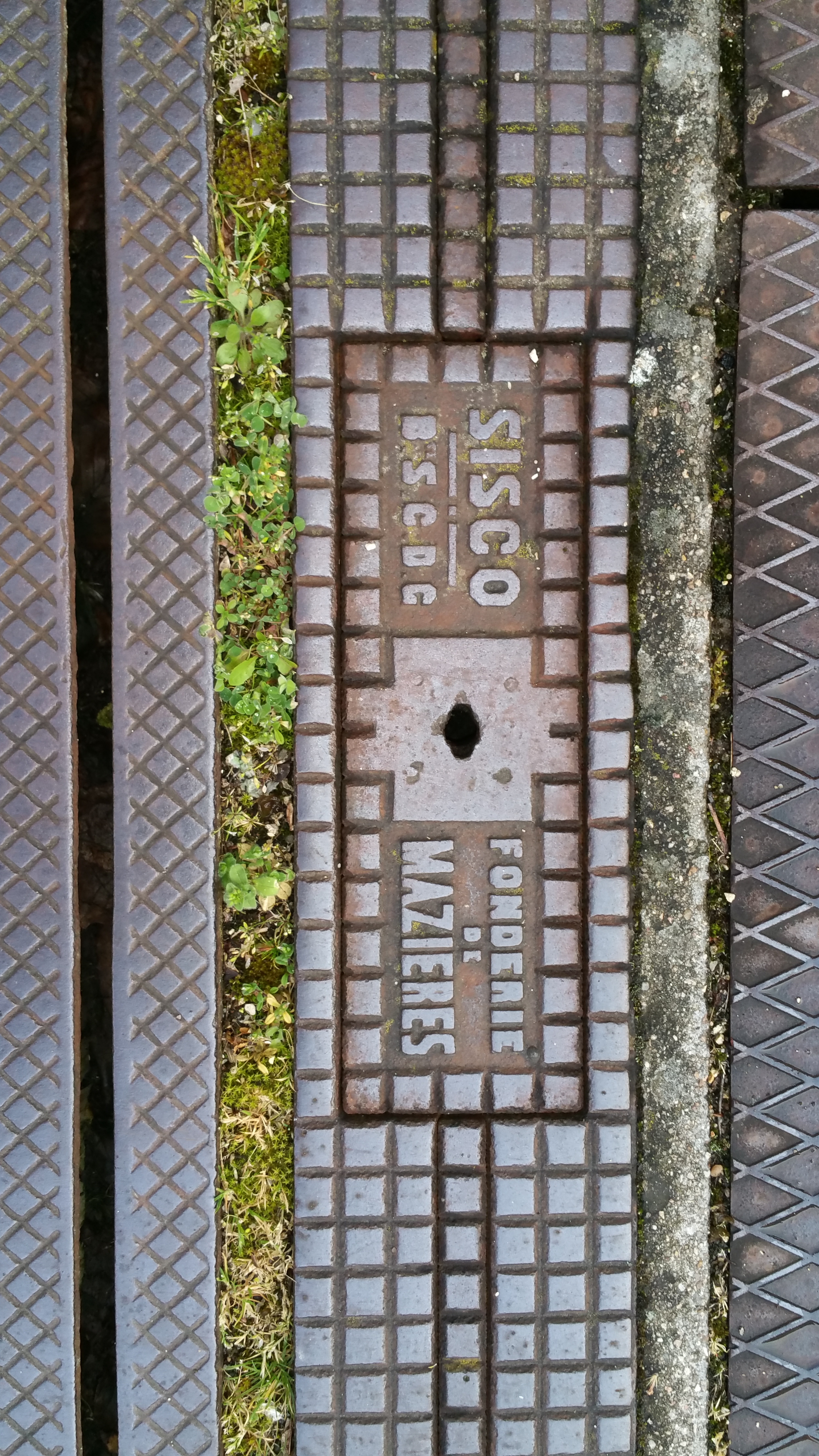
Manhole cover in Bourges with "Mazières" brand

Since 2023, part of the site now houses a bike dealer and repair workshop, Calaise Bicycle. A year later, it has been joined by a fast-food restaurant, Pasta Pino.

=== Name ===
- 1848: Fonderie de Mazières;
- 1875: Société des Usines de Mazières;
- 1930: Société de Commentry, Fourchambault et Decazeville;
- 1954: Société Imphy;
- 1968: FASER (Fonderie d'Aciers Spéciaux et Réfractaires);
- 1970s: subsidiary of Manoirs Industries
- 1980: FAB (Fonderie des Aciers de Bourges);
- 2002-2007: subsidiary of Dellamare Industrie

== Workers' housing estate ==
Ancient workers' houses, rue de Mazières

The construction of the Mazières foundry led to the erection of a new district dedicated to accommodate the workers and their families, between 1849 and 1850. Employees numbers kept rising in the first decades of operations, from a hundred in 1849 to more than 500 in the 1880s.

The 115 housing units still have distinctive features along the Rue de Mazières and its side streets: Rue Sainte-Louise, Rue Sainte-Angélique and Rue Sainte Ursule, named after Léonce de Vogüé's daughters.

The Marquis de Vogüé also commissioned the construction of public facilities:

- a school complex (1882), which became a Catholic school, inaugurated on 20 May 1883, by the Archbishop of Bourges. This school included a class for boys, three primary classes for girls and one for toddlers;
- a Catholic chapel.

Today, both the school and the chapel have been converted into residential homes.

== Manufactured elements ==
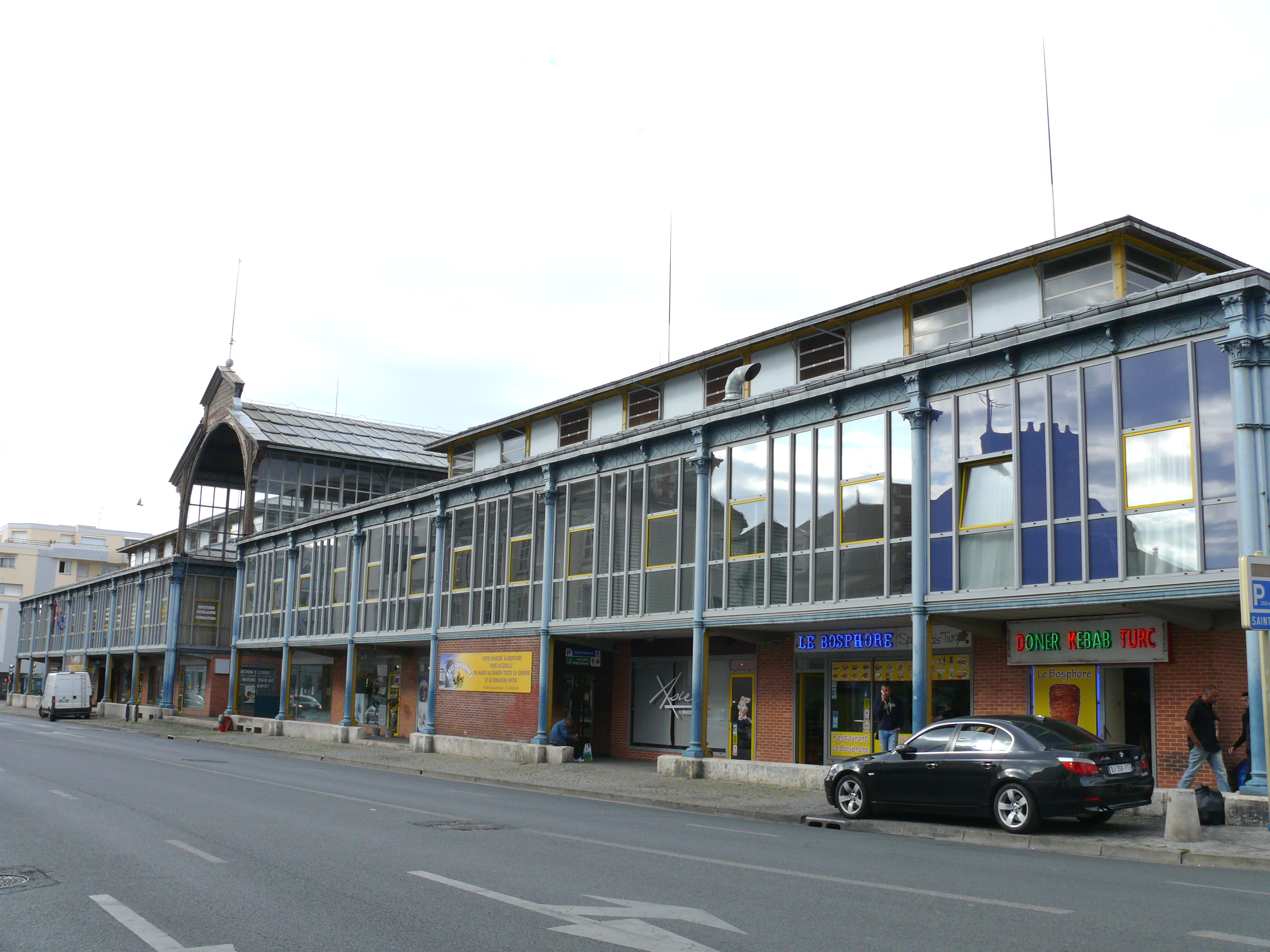
Saint-Bonnet market hall, Bourges

Frameworks and products manufactured at Mazières foundry have been used in many buildings in Europe and America:

- Saint-Bonnet's market hall, Bourges;
- an iron-cast icosahedron, intended to top the pilasters of the Pont Gallieni during its re-building at the end of the 19th century can still be seen in Mehun-sur-Yèvre;
- many structures of emblematic buildings in Paris,such as Palais de l'Industrie (1854, non existent), Halles Baltard (1855, nonexistent), Paris Metro, Gare Saint-Lazare, Church of Saint-Augustin, Pavillon Baltard and the Suresnes bridge (1874, third construction, nonexistent);
- the Marseille-Saint-Charles station;
- framework of the first main station in Vienna, Austria;
- framework of the Saint Joseph's Market in Recife, Brazil.

== See also ==
- Bourges
- Château de la Verrerie
- Léonce de Vogüé
- railway turntable
- swing bridge

== Bibliography ==
- Vogüé, Léonce-Louis-Melchior (1861). Mémoire sur l'amélioration des terres de Boucard et d'Aubigny et sur la ferme de Mazières [Memorandum on the improvement of the Boucard and Aubigny estates and the Mazières farm] (in French). Paris: N. Chaix.
