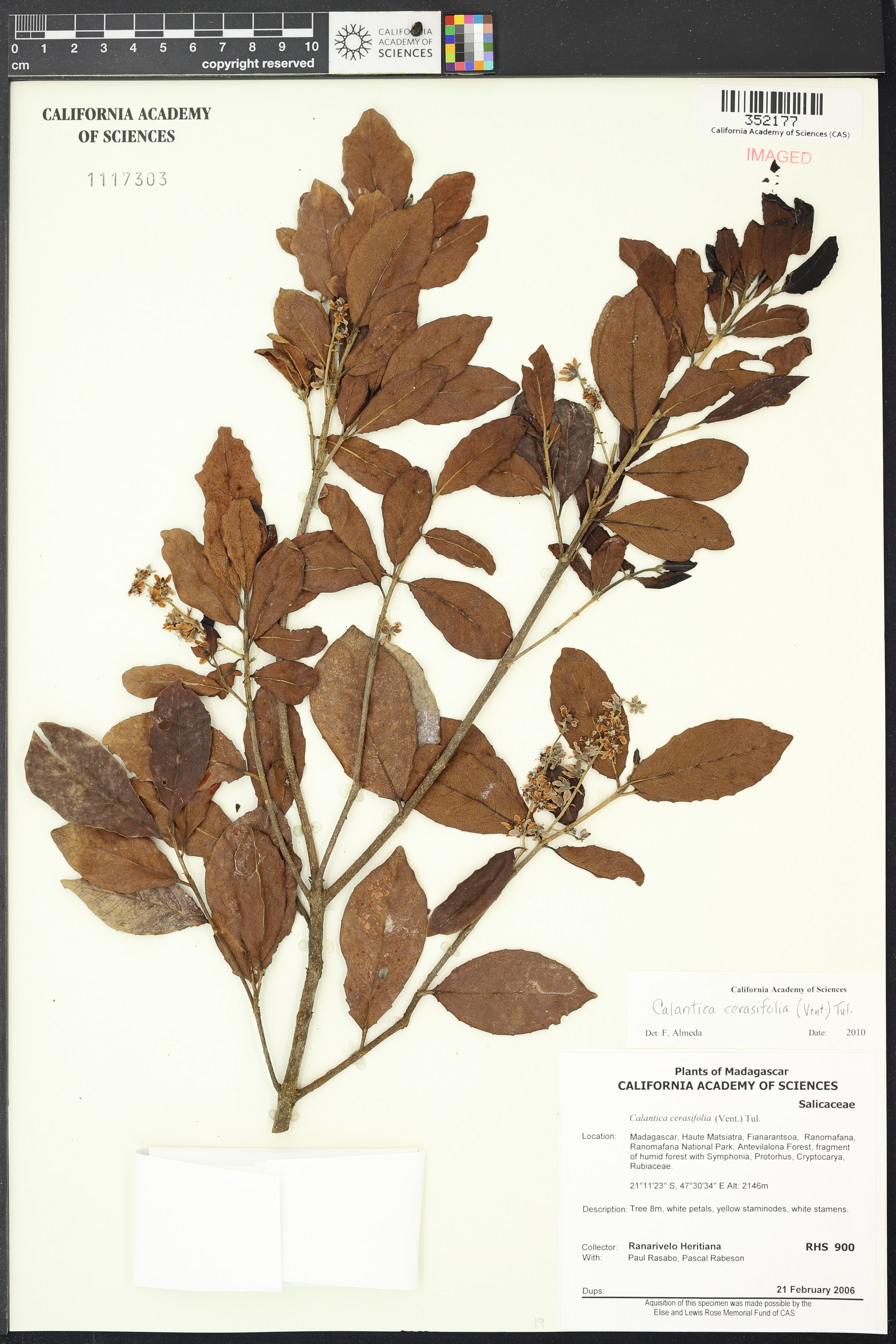
- An acquired specimen from the California Academy of Sciences

Conservation status
- Least Concern (IUCN 3.1)

Scientific classification
- Kingdom: Plantae
- Clade: Tracheophytes
- Clade: Angiosperms
- Clade: Eudicots
- Clade: Rosids
- Order: Malpighiales
- Family: Salicaceae
- Genus: Calantica
- Species: C. cerasifolia

Binomial name
- Calantica cerasifolia (Vent.) Tul.

Synonyms
- Blakwellia cerasifolia Vent.

= Calantica cerasifolia =

Species of flowering plant

Calantica cerasifolia is a species of flowering plant in the family Salicaceae. It is the type species of its genus, Calantica.

The plant is endemic to Madagascar, where it occurs in all provinces, those being Antananarivo, Antsiranana, Fianarantsoa, Mahajanga, Toamasina and Toliara. It grows in humid to sub-humid evergreen forests and thickets, and in dry deciduous forests from sea level to 2,500 m (8,200 ft) in elevation.

The wood of Calantica cerasifolia is used in construction.

== Description ==
Calantica cerasifolia is a tree species that can grow up to 25 m (82 ft) in height and 100 cm (39 in) in diameter at breast height. The plant has pale bark. This species is notable for its large inflorescences, comprising numerous small flowers that are usually 5–7.5 mm (0.20–0.30 in) in diameter, though occasionally reaching up to 10 mm (0.39 in). The perianth is typically pale or yellowish-green to whitish, with rare descriptions noting it as yellow-orange. The glands are yellow to orange, while the disk is pale green or yellow, turning reddish over time. The filaments are white, and the anthers vary in color from red to brown, yellow, or black. The flowers are often reported to have a pleasant scent.

== Taxonomy ==
Calantica cerasifolia is likely to be closely related to Calantica grandiflora, and potential hybrids are theorized to exist.

The original material of Blackwellia cerasifolia was cited by Étienne Pierre Ventenat in 1803 as “originaire de Madagascar; cultivé dans le Jardin Botanique de l’Isle de France, où le Célèbre Naturaliste Riche avoit cueilli l’exemplaire que je fais figurer.” In 1857, Louis René Tulasne reassigned the species as Calantica cerasifolia.

== Conservation status ==
Although it is listed as LC by the IUCN Red List, there are still threats that endanger the species. Threats include residential and commercial development, logging, agriculture and aquaculture, and fire and its suppression, which have been linked to a continuing decline in population.
