= Société de Commentry, Fourchambault et Decazeville =

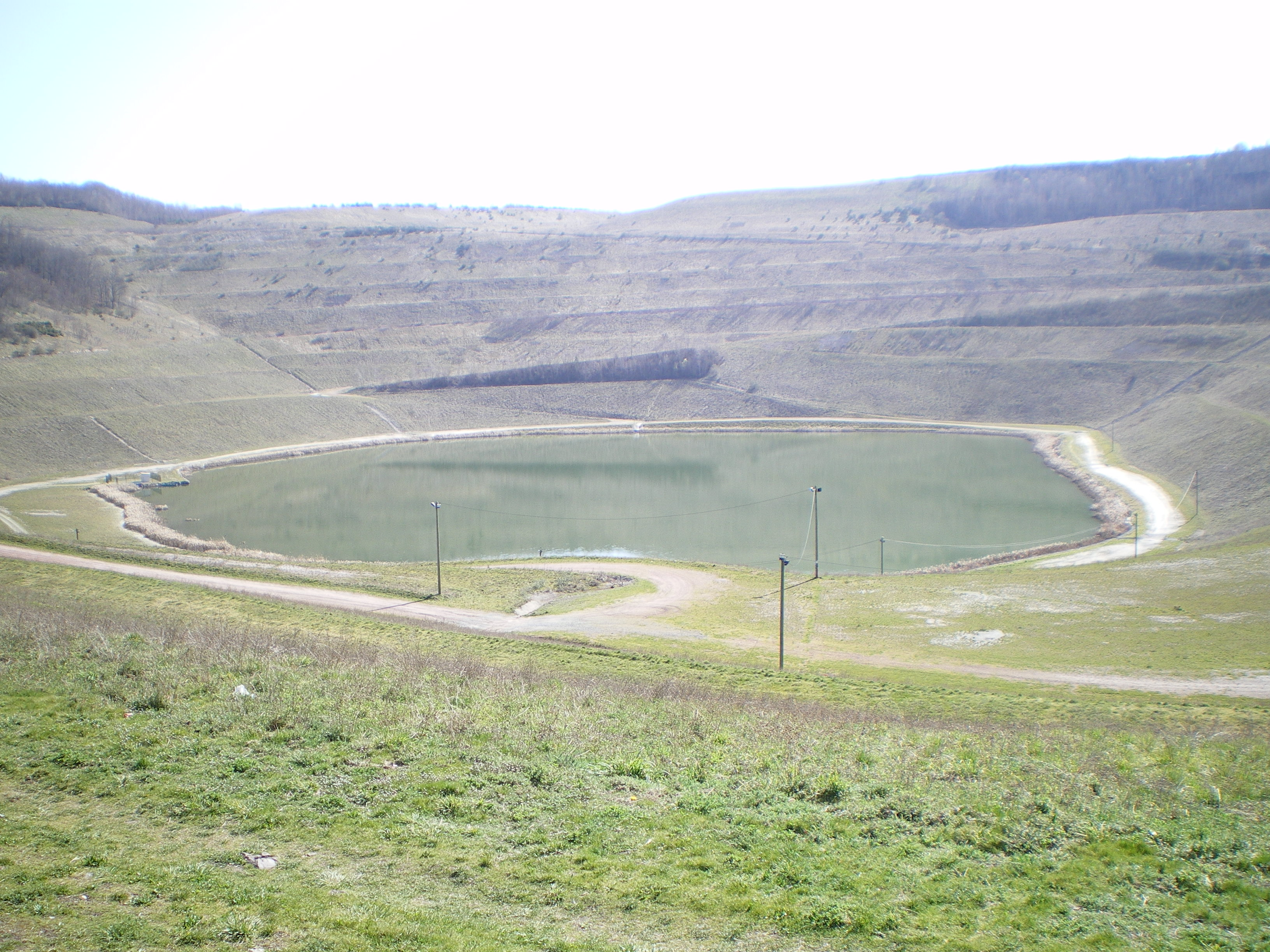
- Open pit coal mine in Decazeville
- Type: Manufacturer
- Industry: Integrated coal and metallurgy
- Founded: 1853
- Defunct: 1968
- Fate: Defunct
- Headquarters: France

The Société de Commentary, Fourchambault et Decazeville was an integrated coal, iron and steel company in France.

== Background ==
In 1817, Jean-Georges Dufaud Père, director of the Grossouvre foundry in Cher, visited Wales on a commercial visit and noted the iron-making technology in use there. That year the Trezi foundry at Grossouvre was adapted to manufacturing iron using Welsh techniques, and delivered the first products in 1818. In 1819, the leases of the Grossouvre site and factories were ceded to Boigues & Fils, iron merchant in Paris, and M. Labbé. They decided to find a new site on the Loire to which it would be easier to transport coal, and decided on Fourchambault in Nièvre. A dock was built for cargo boats, and the Loire provided water for the steam engines.

Construction of the factory at Fourchambault began in 1821. The Charbonnières Raveaux and Cramain furnaces became annexes to the new building, and Boigues & Fils collected several furnaces from Nivernais and Berry. Manufacturing began in 1822. Almost 3,000 workers from the surrounding countryside were employed in the cast iron foundry. In the crisis year of 1848, Charles de Wendel and Eugène Schneider saved the foundry at Fourchambault from bankruptcy by co-signing a huge bank loan.

== History ==
=== 19th Century ===
Locations in France

The Société de Commentary, Fourchambault et Decazeville was formed in 1853 through a merger of the Fourchambault foundry, Imphy (Nièvre) steelworks, Montluçon (Allier) foundry and Commentry (Allier) colliery. The Imphy steelworks was detached from the company and combined with the Saint-Seurin steelworks. They were adapted to use the Bessemer process. In 1869 the two steelworks were reunited with the company. Henri Fayol (1841–1925) was a mining engineer who graduated in 1860. Henri Fayol was engineer at the Commentry coal mines from 1860 to 1866 and director of these mines from 1866 to 1872. He was director of the Commentry, Montvicq and Berry mines from 1872 to 1888.

In the Commentary municipal elections of 21 January 1881, Christophe Thivrier was elected to the council with the entire list of workers and socialists. It was the first town hall in France to be captured by the workers party and the socialists. Thivrier defeated Stéphane Mony, the director of the Commentary, Fourchambault, and a former mayor and deputy. A list was prepared of everyone who had spread socialist propaganda during the elections, including 135 miners. On 4 June 1881, they were all dismissed, and the workers went on strike. Another 300 were added to the list of "agitators" during the strike, and had to pass interviews to get their jobs back after the strike. 60 failed these interviews, and 67 were told they needed certificates of good conduct from their new employers before they could work again at the mines. Miners who had been elected to the local council could not find work and had to leave the district.

In 1888, Henri Fayol became director-general of the company, holding office until 1918. In 1890, another strike broke out in Commentary due to the dismissal of 300 miners chosen from the most active socialists. Thivrier, now a deputy, spoke out against the interventions and provocations of the army and gendarmerie in support of the mining company. In 1891, the company acquired the Brassac (Puy-de-Dôme) iron ore mines and in 1892, it absorbed the Société des forges et fonderies de l'Aveyron. The Aveyron works, founded in 1826 and reorganized in 1868, was one of the first large integrated metallurgical factories in the country. In 1900, Fayol became a member of the Central Committee of Coalowners of France, member of the board of the Comité des forges and administrator of the Société de Commentary Fourchambault et Decazeville.

=== 20th century ===
In 1900. the Société de Commentary, Fourchambault et Decazeville included the Commentary, Montvicq, Brassac and Decazeville (Aveyron) collieries, and the blast furnaces, foundries, forges and steelworks of Fourchambault, Imphy, Montluçon and Decazeville. The company extracted iron ore from the Berry mines and from its concessions in Aveyron. Various smaller establishments were absorbed between 1900 and 1950. In 1900, the company began to exploit the Joudreville concession. In 1910, the company bought the Mines de Campagnac.

The factories of Mazières (Cher) and Pamiers (Ariège) were acquired in 1930. In 1931, the company bought the Société Métallurgique de l'Ariège and the Société des Mines de Manganèse de Las Cabessas. In 1942, the company bought the Charbonnages du Centre. In 1954, the company was renamed the Société métallurgique d'Imphy. In 1968, it was merged with the Société des forges et aciéries du Creusot, which in 1971 became Creusot-Loire. The combined company was in turn absorbed by Creusot-Loire (Saône-et-Loire) in 1971. The Creusot-Loire group was liquidated in December 1984.

== Sources ==
- Dassé, Pauline (2006), Société de Commentry, Fourchambault et Decazeville (59 Aq Et 1996 064 - 36 Mi) Inventaire Des Archives Photographiques (PDF) (in French), Centre Des Archives du Monde du Travail
- "Fayol, Henri", Patrons de France (in French)
- Jolly, Jean (1960), "THIVRIER, CHRISTOPHE", dictionnaire des parlementaires français de 1889 à 1940 (in French)
- Landes, David S. (1999-05-17), The Wealth and Poverty of Nations: Why Some Are So Rich and Some So Poor, W. W. Norton, ISBN 978-0-393-06981-5
- Peaucelle, Jean-Louis (2015-07-22), Henri Fayol, the Manager, Routledge, ISBN 978-1-317-31939-9
- "Société de Commentry - Fourchambault", industrie.lu (in French)
