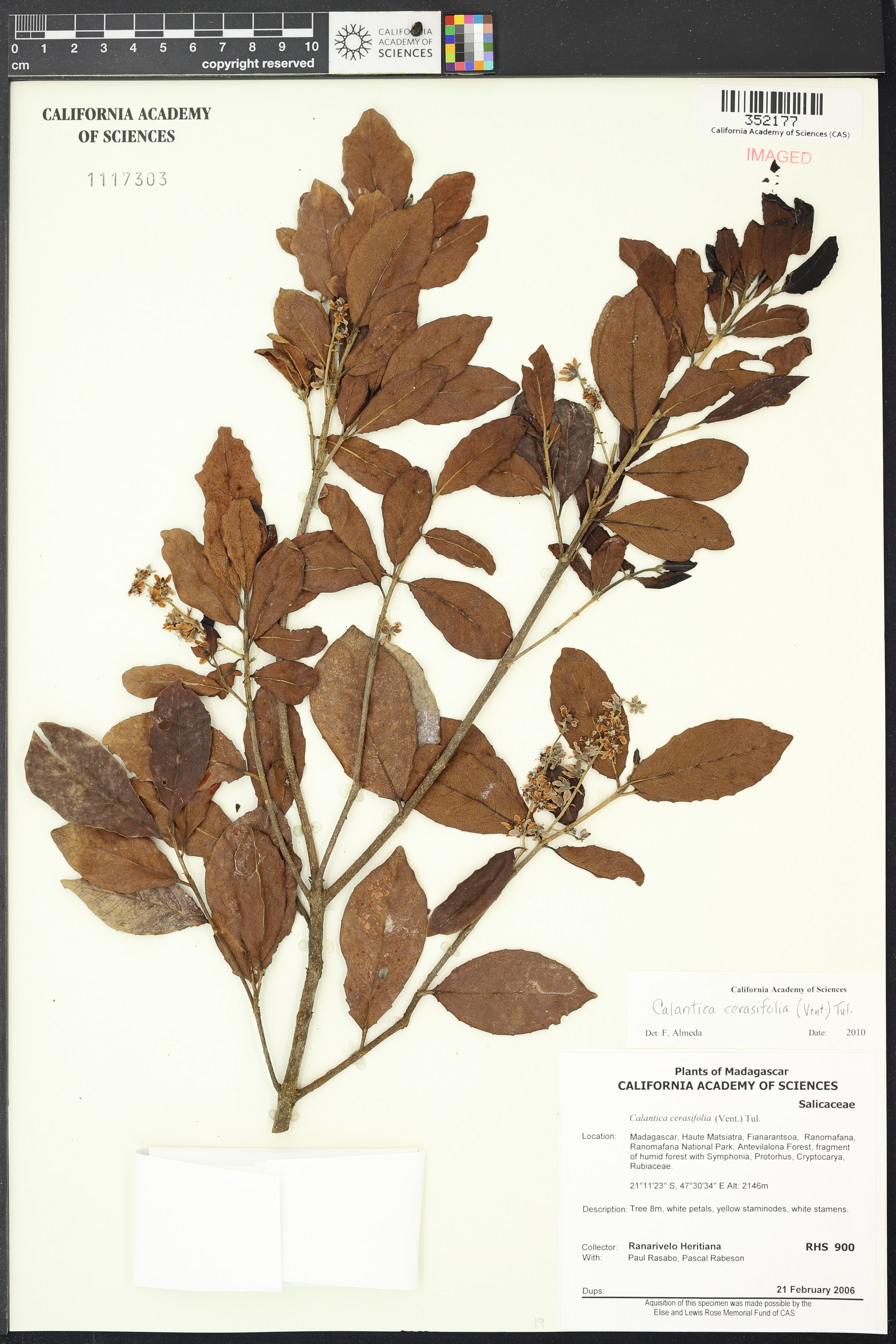
- An acquired specimen of Calantica cerasifolia from the California Academy of Sciences

Scientific classification
- Kingdom: Plantae
- Clade: Embryophytes
- Clade: Tracheophytes
- Clade: Spermatophytes
- Clade: Angiosperms
- Clade: Eudicots
- Clade: Rosids
- Order: Malpighiales
- Family: Salicaceae
- Subfamily: Salicoideae
- Tribe: Homalieae
- Genus: Calantica; Jaub. ex Tul.

Type species
- Calantica cerasifolia (Vent.) Tul.

Species
- 10; see text

= Calantica (plant) =

Genus of flowering plants

Calantica is a genus of flowering plants in the family Salicaceae. It is endemic to Madagascar.

== Taxonomy ==
Calantica is closely related to the pantropical and diverse genus Homalium, from which it differs in having a superior ovary, instead of a semi-inferior ovary. The genus is also similar to Bivinia in its superior ovary but has numerous stamens and long spiciform inflorescences.

== Known species ==
The following species are accepted by Plants of the World Online:

- Calantica biseriata H.Perrier
- Calantica capuronii Sleumer
- Calantica cerasifolia (Vent.) Tul.
- Calantica chauvetiae Sleumer
- Calantica decaryana H.Perrier
- Calantica grandiflora Jaub. ex Tul.
- Calantica lucida Scott-Elliot
- Calantica olivacea Appleq., Phillipson & G.E.Schatz
- Calantica pseudobiseriata Appleq., Phillipson & G.E.Schatz
- Calantica sphaerocephala Appleq., Phillipson & G.E.Schatz
