= Chemin de fer de Lyon à la Méditerranée =

French railway company (1852–1857)

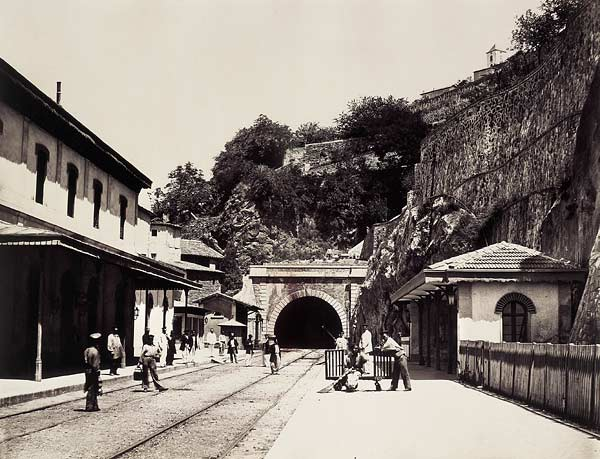
- The Vienne station on the Lyon-Valence line built. The buildings have a southern style, with four-sided roofs.
- Founded: March 27, 1852; 174 years ago in Paris, France -->
- Defunct: June 19, 1857

The Chemin de fer de Lyon à la Méditerranée (French pronunciation: [ʃəmɛ̃ də fɛʁ də ljɔ̃ a la meditɛʁane]) was a short-lived railway company in the south of France. It was formed in 1852 and merged in 1857 with the Chemin de fer de Paris à Lyon and others to form the Chemins de fer de Paris à Lyon et à la Méditerranée (PLM).

== Origins ==
A concession was granted in 1843 for the line from Marseille to Avignon. In 1850 a draft law was discussed to merge the Paris-Lyon and Lyon-Avignon concessions. The city of Lyon opposed the merger since it would threaten its transit and warehouse operations, and it was agreed to keep the concessions separate. Based on a law of 1 December 1851, on 3 January 1852 the concession for a line from Lyon to Avignon, which had been suspended since 1847, was given to a company whose members included Paulin Talabot. The law of 1 December 1851 authorized formation of the Chemin de fer de Lyon à Avignon, owned by Genissieu, Boigues & Cie, Emile Martin & Cie, Edouard Blount, Parent (Bazile), and Drouillard Benoist & Cie.

== History ==
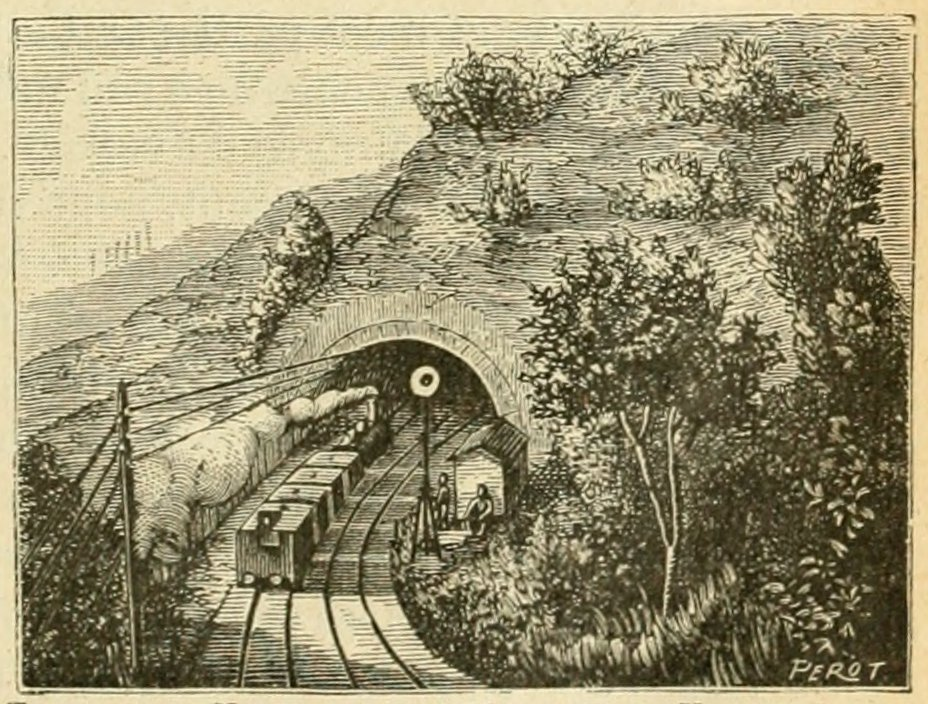
Tunnel de la Nerthe to the north of Marseille

The Chemin de fer de Lyon à Avignon company was formed by deed of 22 March 1852 to operate railway lines from Lyon to Avignon, Marseille to Avignon, Alès to Beaucaire, Alès to the Grand'Combe mines, Montpellier to Celle, Montpellier to Nîmes, Rognac to Aix and Marseille to Toulon. A law of 8 July 1852 approved merger of the companies of Avignon-Marseille, Montpellier-Sète, Gard and Montpellier-Nimes with the Lyon-Avignon company. The law approved an agreement on 19 June 1852 between the Minister of Public Works and the Chemin de fer de Lyon à Avignon.

The merged company had the concession to build the Marseille-Toulon line. It was named the Chemin de fer de Lyon à la Méditerranée. Talabot became its director. The industrialist Jules Hochet (1813–1867) was an administrator. The renamed company was recognised as an anonymous company on 8 December 1852. The section from Valence to Avignon was opened in 1854. On 16 April 1855 the line was connected from Lyon to Valence. In 1856 the line was opened connecting the Paris-Lyon terminal of Lyon-Vaise to the Lyon-Marseille terminal of Lyon-Guillotiere.

== Merger ==
The Paris-Lyon and Lyon-Mediterranean companies were not rivals, and recognized that they must merge. This took place in 1857. The combined Chemins de fer de Paris à Lyon et à la Méditerranée was constituted on 11 April 1857.

== Sources ==
- Bulletin des lois de la République française No 558 (in French), Paris: Imprimerie nationale des lois, July 1852
- "CCLXXXIII n. 7393", Collection complète des lois, décrets, ordonnances, réglements, et avis du Conseil d'Etat / J. B. Duvergier (in French), Paris: A. Guyot et Scribe, 1852
- HOCHET Jules (1813-1867), Association des Amis et Passionnés du Père-Lachaise
- May, Mathieu-Georges (1931), "L'histoire du chemin de fer de Paris à Marseille", Revue de géographie alpine (in French), 19 (2)
