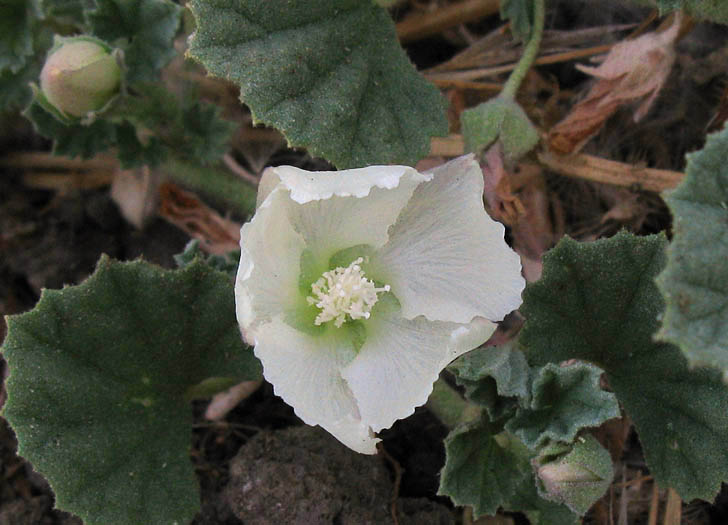

Scientific classification
- Kingdom: Plantae
- Clade: Tracheophytes
- Clade: Angiosperms
- Clade: Eudicots
- Clade: Rosids
- Order: Malvales
- Family: Malvaceae
- Genus: Malvella
- Species: M. leprosa

Binomial name
- Malvella leprosa (Ortega) Krapov.

Synonyms
- List: Disella hederacea (Douglas) Greene; Malva albifolia Larrañaga; Malva californica C.Presl; Malva hederacea Douglas; Malva leprosa Ortega; Malva obliqua (Nutt.) A.Gray; Malva plicata Nutt.; Malva sulphurea Gillies ex Hook. & Arn.; Malvastrum sulphureum (Gillies ex Hook. & Arn.) Griseb.; Sida hederacea (Douglas) Torr. ex A.Gray; Sida leprosa (Ortega) K.Schum.; Sida obliqua Nutt.; Sida sulphurea (Gillies ex Hook. & Arn.) A.Gray

= Malvella leprosa =

Species of plant in the mallow family

Malvella leprosa is a species of flowering plant in the mallow family known by the common names alkali mallow and alkali sida. It is native to much of the western United States, Mexico, Argentina, and Chile. It is known in parts of Australia as an introduced species. In many regions, whether native there or not, the plant is often a noxious weed and easily invades habitat, including areas with alkaline and saline soils. In California, the plant can be found in agricultural lands, including fields and orchards. This is a decumbent perennial herb producing a white-hairy stem up to about 40 centimetres (16 in) long, spreading along the ground. The leaves are variable in shape but are generally lobed and wavy along the edges, measuring 1 to 3 centimetres (3/8 to 1 1/8 in) wide. Leaves appear in the leaf axils singly or in clusters of up to 3. Each flower is a cup-shaped corolla of five petals up to 1.5 centimetres (2/3 in) long in shades of pale pink, white, or light yellow. The disc-shaped fruit is divided into several segments.
