= Jules Hochet =

French industrialist

Jules Louis Hochet
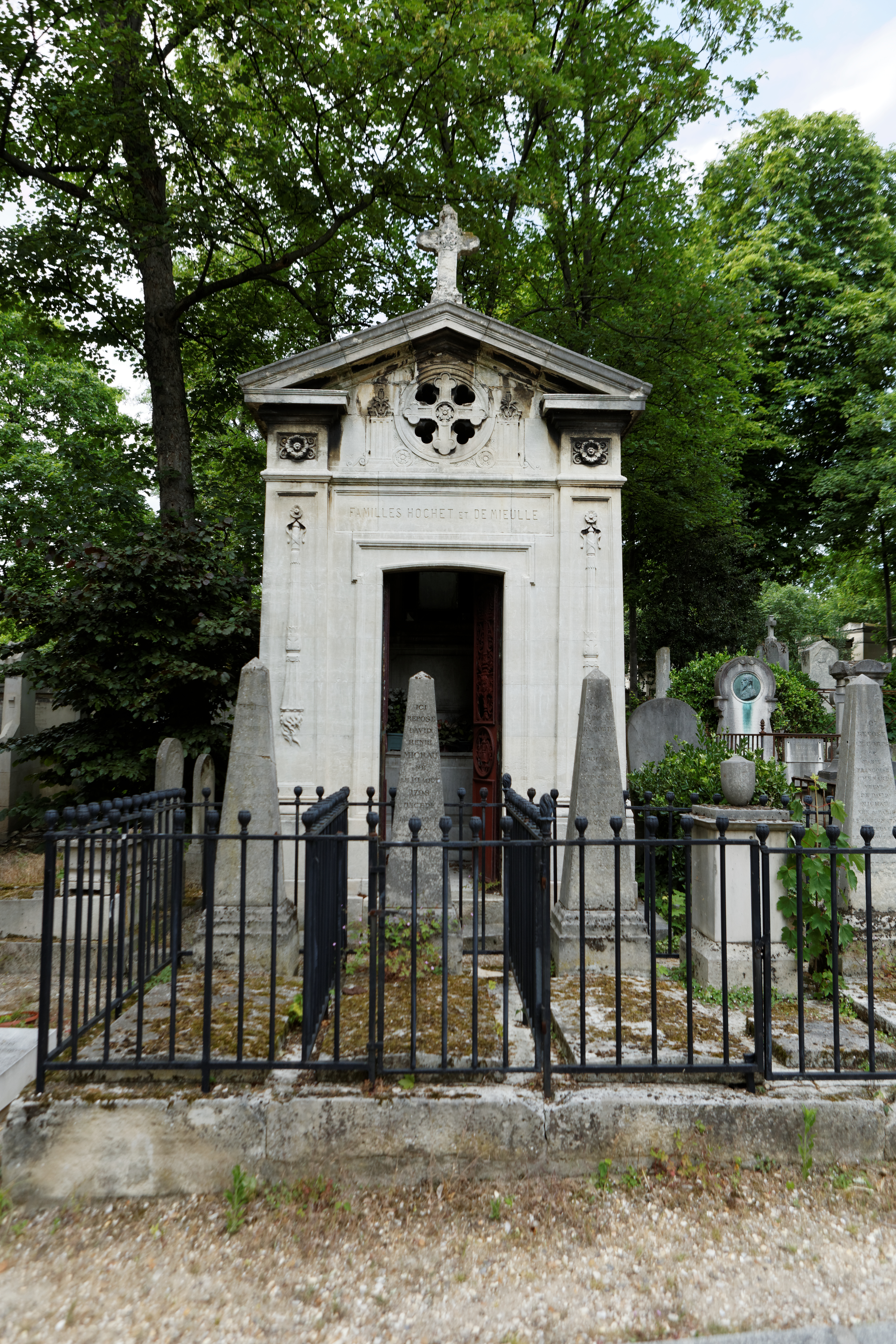
- Hochet family grave in Père Lachaise Cemetery
- Born: 17 March 1813; Paris
- Died: 2 April 1867 (aged 54); Paris
- Occupations: Railway and foundry manager

Jules Louis Hochet (17 March 1813 – 2 April 1867) was a French industrialist who managed an iron foundry and a railway line in the south of France.

== Early years ==
Jules Louis Hochet was born on 17 March 1813 in the 2nd arrondissement of Paris. His parents were Claude Hochet (1772–1857) and Gabrielle Boigues (1788–1855). He had three sisters and one brother, Prosper Hochet (1810–83), who became a Deputy for Cher. On 16 June 1845 he married Euphrosine Augustine Marguerite Rosalie Sylvie Dumont (1828–1906).

== Iron master ==
Hochet became manager of the iron foundry of the Société Boigues & Cie. In 1846 Hochet, iron master at Fourchambault, became a member of the Association pour la défense du Travail national. This had been formed to oppose the lowering of tariffs. The council included Antoine Odier (President), Auguste Mimerel (Vice-President), Joseph Périer (Treasurer) and Louis-Martin Lebeuf (Secretary). Members included Henri Barbet, Léon Talabot and Eugène Schneider. In 1860, as iron master at Fourchambault, he submitted observations to the Chamber of Deputies railway commission on the situation of the iron industry.

While a manager of the Société Boigues, Rambourg et Cie. at Fourchambault Jules Hochet had built, at his own expense, a hospital with twelve beds, a pharmacy, a consulting room and an operating room. In 1878 it was reported that although the establishment was used daily for consultations and pharmacy, it rarely had to be used by sick or wounded Fourchambault workers. In 1865 his family contributed a large part of the cost of building the Saint-Gabriel Church in the parish of Saint Gabriel.

What would become the Comité des forges was founded at a meeting on 15 February 1864, with representatives of foundries that produced over 20,000 tonnes of pig iron or 15,000 tonnes of steel annually. The Committee had the goals of managing relations between the industry and government, promoting exports and coordinating prices. Eugène Schneider (1805–75) was the first President and Jules Hochet was chosen as vice-president. Hochet was also administrator of the Compagnie du chemin de fer de Lyon à la Méditerranée (Lyon-Mediterranean Railway Company). Hochet was on the board of the Chemins de fer de Paris à Lyon et à la Méditerranée for the south section of the network.

Hochet was made an officer of the Imperial Order of the Legion of Honour. He died on 2 April 1867 in the 2nd arrondissement of Paris. He was buried in his family chapel in Père Lachaise Cemetery.

== Sources ==
- Bulletin des lois de la République franc̜aise, Imprimerie nationale, 1865
- "Comité des forges", Encyclopédie Larousse (in French), Éditions Larousse
- Conseil supérieur de l'agriculture, du commerce, et de l'industrie (1860), Enquête, Imprimerie impériale
- Derrien, Cédric, "Jules Louis HOCHET", Geneanet
- Gille, Bertrand (1968), La Sidérurgie française au XIXe siècle: Recherches histioriques (in French), Librairie Droz, ISBN 978-2-600-04046-4
- HOCHET Jules (1813-1867), Association des Amis et Passionnés du Père-Lachaise, archived from the original on 2017-08-07
- Leveque, Roger, HOCHET Jules
- Ministre de l'Interieur (1878), Exposition Universelle de 1878: Enquête sur les institutions et oêuvres d'assistance, de prévoyance, d'épargne et da mutualité crées ..., Nièvre (France): Imprimerie & Lithographie Fay
- Priouret, Roger (1992-02-04), Origines du patronat français, Grasset, ISBN 978-2-246-79486-8
- The Foreign Quarterly Review, Treuttel, 1847
