= Lascelle =

Commune in Auvergne-Rhône-Alpes, France

- Commune
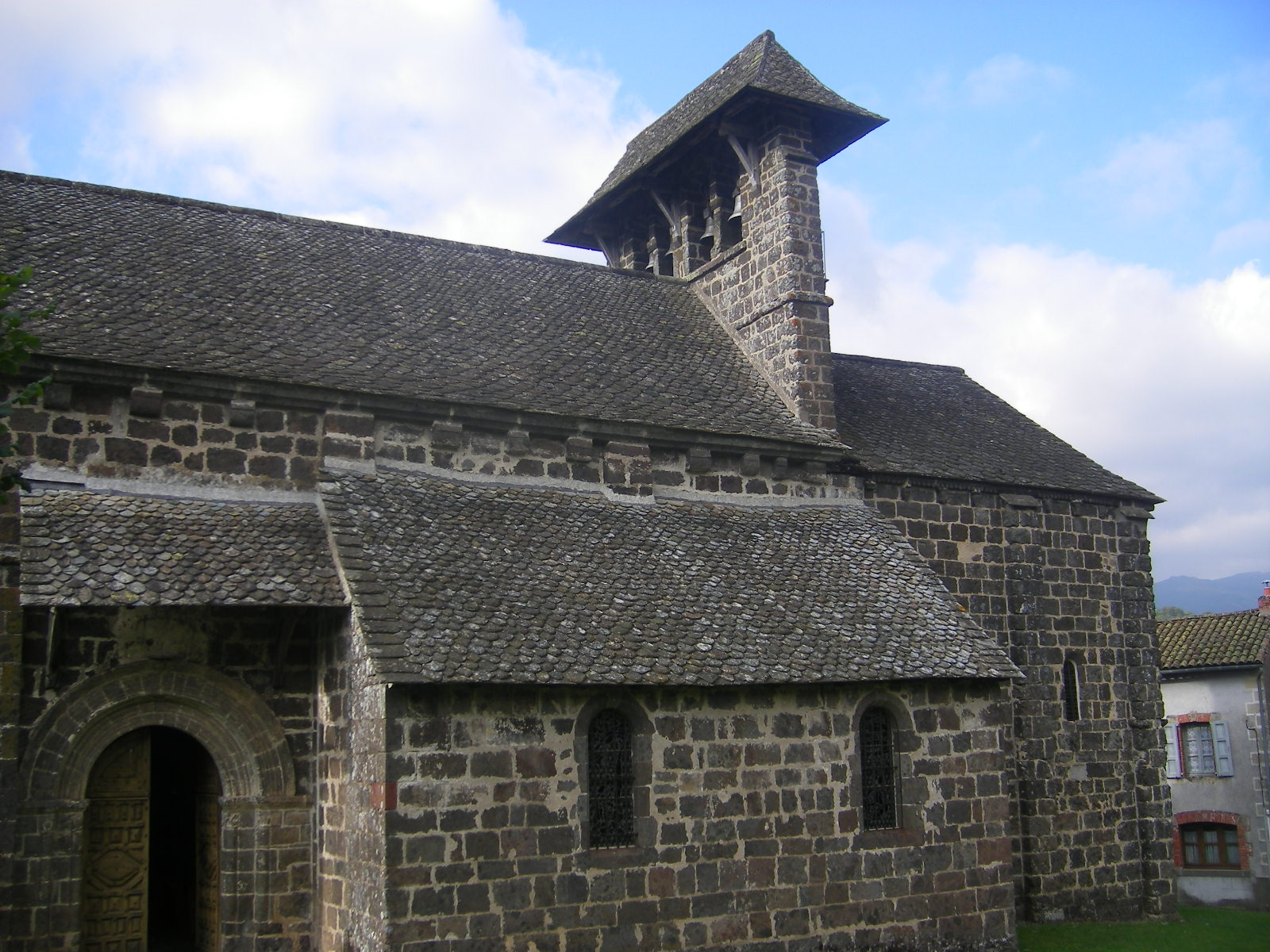
- The church in Lascelle
- Location of Lascelle
- Location within France Location within Auvergne-Rhône-Alpes
- Coordinates: 45°01′25″N 2°34′34″E
- Country: France
- Region: Auvergne-Rhône-Alpes
- Department: Cantal
- Arrondissement: Aurillac
- Canton: Vic-sur-Cère
- Intercommunality: CA Aurillac Agglomération

Government
  - Mayor (2020–2026): Jean-Michel Faubladier
- Area^{1}: 19.1 km^{2} (7.4 sq mi)
- Elevation: 760 m (2,490 ft)
- Highest elevation: 1,337 m (4,386 ft)
- Lowest elevation: 708 m (2,323 ft)
- Population (2023): 260
  - Density: 14/km^{2} (35/sq mi)
- Time zone: UTC+01:00 (CET)
  - Summer (DST): UTC+02:00 (CEST)
- INSEE/Postal code: 15096 /15590
- ^{1} French Land Register data, which excludes lakes, ponds, glaciers > 1 km^{2} (0.386 sq mi or 247 acres) and river estuaries.

Lascelle (French pronunciation: [lasɛl]; Occitan: Las Celas) is a commune in the Cantal department in south-central France.

== Population ==
Historical population
Year	Pop.	±% p.a.
1968	391	—
1975	335	−2.18%
1982	335	+0.00%
1990	325	−0.38%
1999	317	−0.28%
2007	316	−0.04%
2012	311	−0.32%
2017	299	−0.78%
2023	260	−2.30%
Source: INSEE

== See also ==
- Communes of the Cantal department
