= Prosper Hochet =

French lawyer and senior administrator

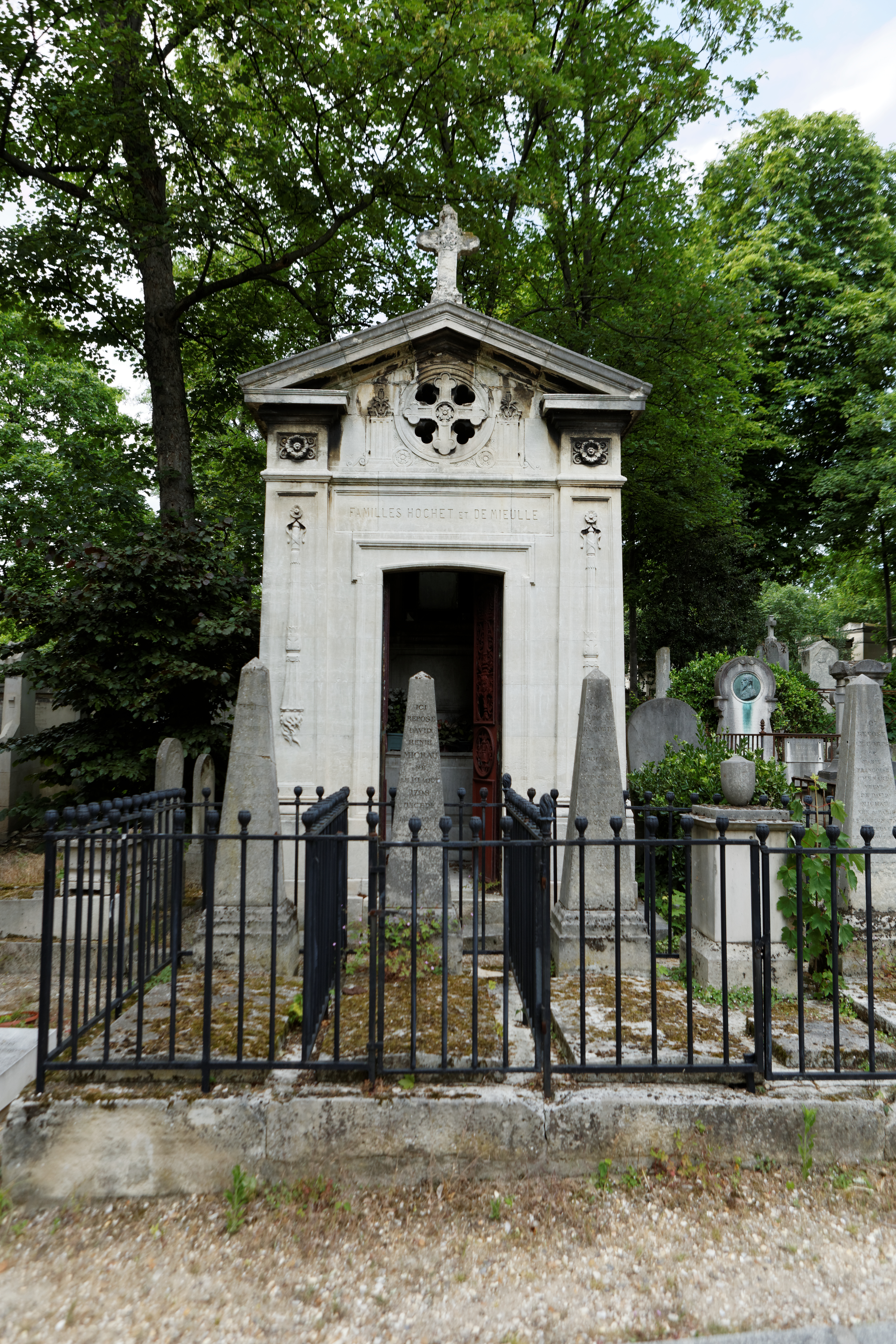
- Hochet tomb in Père Lachaise Cemetery

Deputy for Cher
- In office 1 August 1846 – 24 February 1848

Secretary-General of the Council of State
- In office 1839–1851

Personal details
- Born: 26 April 1810 Paris, France
- Died: 18 May 1883 (aged 73) Paris, France
- Occupation: Lawyer, Politician
- Known for: Secretary-General of the Council of State

Prosper Hochet (26 April 1810 – 18 May 1883) was a French lawyer and senior administrator who was Secretary-General of the Council of State of Louis-Philippe (r. 1830–1848) and of the French Second Republic. He served as a deputy in the last years of the July Monarchy.

== Early years ==
Prosper Hochet was born in Paris on 26 April 1810. His parents were Claude Hochet (1772–1857) and Gabrielle Boigues (1788–1855). Prosper's father was an iron master who was made Master of Requests and honorary Councilor of State in 1822. He had three sisters and one brother, Jules Hochet (1813–1867). Jules would become Inspector of Finances. Prosper was among the twenty founders of the Conférence Molé debating society on 19 March 1832. Four of them later became members of the Council of State including Prosper Hochet, Mortimer Ternaux, Achille Guilhem and Édouard Bocher.

Prosper Hochet joined the administration of the July Monarchy first as auditor in Louis-Philippe's Council of State, then as Master of Requests. Claude Hochet resigned from his offices in 1839 to make way for his son. Prosper Hochet replaced his father as Secretary General of the Council of State on 12 March 1839. He was replaced as Master of Requests by Léon Cordunet and M. Louyer-Villermay.

On 18 May 1841 Prosper Hochet married Marie Camille Trubert (born 1823). He was made a knight of the Legion of Honour on 4 May 1844.

== Political career ==
Hochet was elected a member of the Chamber of Deputies on 1 August 1846 for the Cher department. His opponent was Florestan Bonnaire, who said he would demand freedom of education "under the supervision of the university". Hochet was in favour of fulfilling the guarantees of the charter without subterfuge. He was a member of the Centre-Right group. Until the Revolution of February 1848 he supported the ministry of François Guizot. He left office when the chamber was dissolved on 24 February 1848. Hochet did not reenter politics after the revolution.

== Later career ==
In June 1850 Hochet was Secretary General of the Council of State, of which Henri Georges Boulay de la Meurthe was president. The position of Secretary-General was one of the functionaries appointed to the council of state by the President of the Republic, and was responsible for managing the work of the office and taking minutes at general assemblies. Hochet ran the offices at the quai d'Orsay supported by Philippe Pierson as Secretary of Litigation, five secretaries of sections and committees and various other administrators. By decree of 13 December 1851 Napoleon III appointed Hochet secretary-general of the consultative commission. Hochet resigned from the consultative commission as of 23 January 1852.

Prosper Hochet was a member of the Cercle des chemins de fer in 1861. He died on 18 May 1883 in Paris. He is buried in Père Lachaise Cemetery.

== Sources ==
- Casabianca, X. de (1852), L'Ami de la religion (in French), Librairie Ecclésiastique d'adrien le clere et cie
- Derrien, Cédric, "Prosper HOCHET", Geneanet
- Doyon, André; Parc, Yves Du (1972), De Mélanie à Lamiel: ou, D'un amour d'Henri Beyle au roman de Stendahal, Librairie Droz, ISBN 978-2-600-04335-9
- French Republic (1851), Almanach royal, Veuve d'Houry
- Lesur, M. C. L. (1841), Annuaire historique universel pour 1839 (in French), Imp. D'Ange Clo.
- Martin-Frugier, Anne (April–June 1989), "La formation des élites: les "conférences" sous la Restauration et la Monarchie de Juillet", Revue d'histoire moderne et contemporaine (in French), 36 (2), Societe d'Histoire Moderne et Contemporaine: 211–244, doi:10.3406/rhmc.1989.1491, JSTOR 20529584
- Prosper Hochet (in French), Assemblée nationale
- HOCHET Prosper (1810-1883) (in French), APPL – Association des Amis et Passionnés du Père-Lachaise
- Leveque, Roger, HOCHET Prosper (in French)
- Riancey, Henri Léon Camusat de (1846), Compte rendu des élections de 1846: avec des pièces justificatives contenant les professions de foi, déclarations ou engagements des candidats et des députés en faveur de la liberté religieuse, J. Lecoffre et cie
- Robert, Adolphe; Cougny, Gaston (1889), "Hochet, Prosper", dictionnaire des parlementaires français de 1789 à 1889 (in French)
- Ronher, E. (1852), Senate Documents, Otherwise Publ. as Public Documents and Executive Documents: 14th Congress, 1st Session-48th Congress, 2nd Session and Special Session
- Say, Horace (1850), "Project de Loi [monts-de-piété]", Compte-rendu des séances de l'Assemblée nationale: exposés de motifs et projets de lois présentés par le gouvernement. Rapports de MM. les représentants, Panckoucke
