= Fourchambault =

- Commune
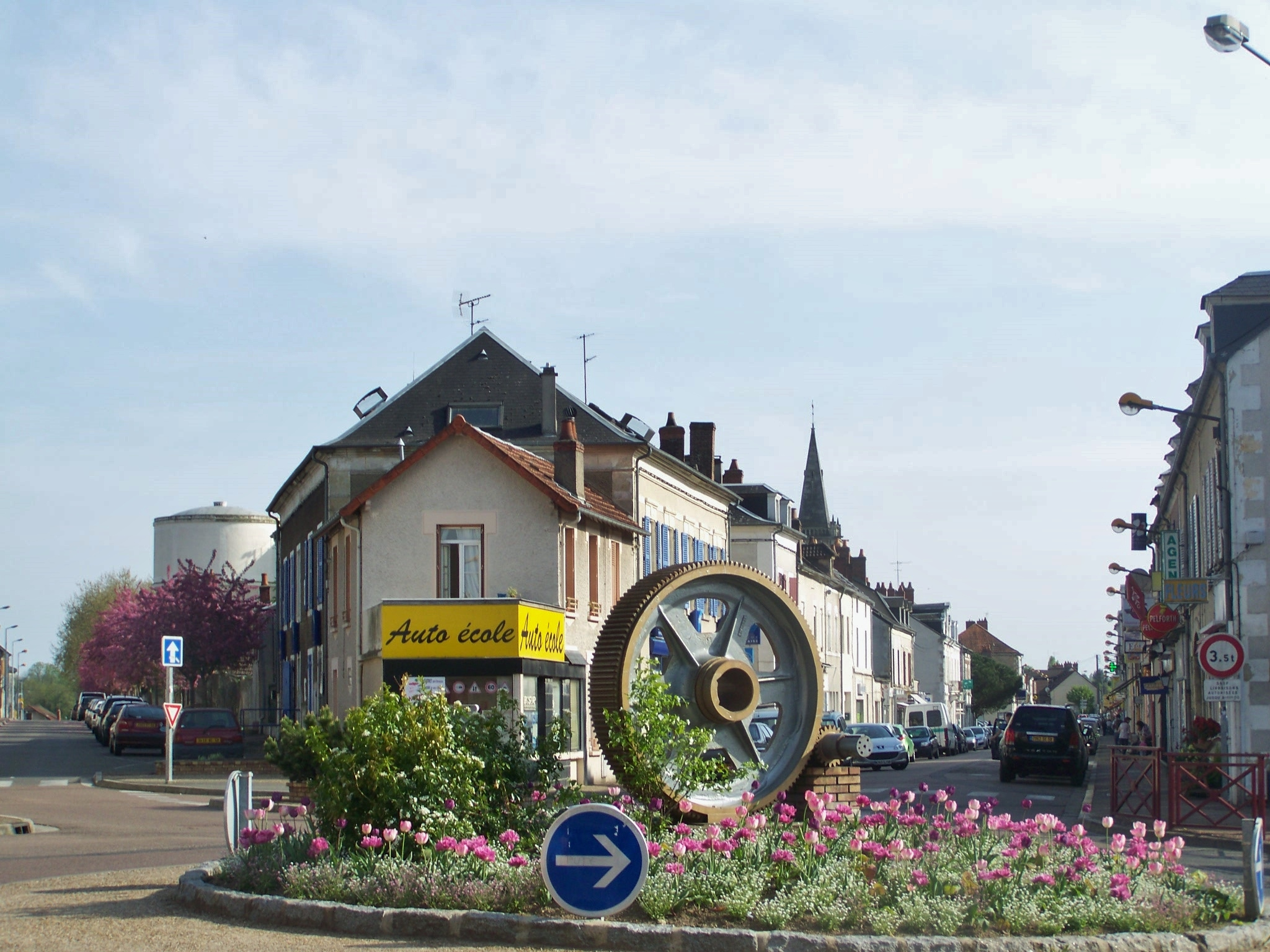
- The centre of Fourchambault

- Coat of arms
- Location of Fourchambault
- Location within France Location within Bourgogne-Franche-Comté
- Coordinates: 47°01′10″N 3°05′08″E
- Country: France
- Region: Bourgogne-Franche-Comté
- Department: Nièvre
- Arrondissement: Nevers
- Canton: Fourchambault
- Intercommunality: CA Nevers

Government
  - Mayor (2020–2026): Alain Herteloup
- Area^{1}: 4.55 km^{2} (1.76 sq mi)
- Highest elevation: 181 m (594 ft)
- Lowest elevation: 162 m (531 ft)
- Population (2023): 3,992
  - Density: 877/km^{2} (2,270/sq mi)
- Time zone: UTC+01:00 (CET)
  - Summer (DST): UTC+02:00 (CEST)
- INSEE/Postal code: 58117 /58600
- ^{1} French Land Register data, which excludes lakes, ponds, glaciers > 1 km^{2} (0.386 sq mi or 247 acres) and river estuaries.

Fourchambault (French pronunciation: [fuʁʃɑ̃bo]) is a commune in the Nièvre department in central France.

== Geography ==
Fourchambault lies on the right, eastern bank of the river Loire, about 7 km northwest of Nevers. Fourchambault station has rail connections to Nevers, Cosne-sur-Loire and Paris. The A77 autoroute (Montargis–Nevers) passes east of the town.

== Demographics ==
Historical population
Year	Pop.	±% p.a.
1968	6,279	—
1975	6,625	+0.77%
1982	5,850	−1.76%
1990	5,037	−1.85%
1999	4,828	−0.47%
2007	4,711	−0.31%
2012	4,787	+0.32%
2017	4,229	−2.45%
2023	3,992	−0.96%
Source: INSEE

== Industrial history ==
In 1819 Boigues & Fils, iron merchant in Paris, and M. Labbé, decided to find a new site on the Loire for their iron foundry to which it would be easier to transport coal, and decided on Fourchambault. A dock was built for cargo boats, and the Loire provided water for the steam engines. Construction of the factory at Fourchambault began in 1821. The Charbonnières Raveaux and Cramain furnaces became annexes to the new building, and Boigues & Fils collected several furnaces from Nivernais and Berry. Manufacturing began in 1822. Almost 3,000 workers from the surrounding countryside were employed in the cast iron foundry.

The Société de Commentry, Fourchambault et Decazeville was formed in 1853 through a merger of the Fourchambault foundry, Imphy (Nièvre) steelworks, Montluçon (Allier) foundry and Commentry (Allier) colliery. In 1954 the company was renamed the Société métallurgique d'Imphy. In 1968 it was merged with the Société des forges et aciéries du Creusot, which in 1971 became Creusot-Loire. The combined company was in turn absorbed by Creusot-Loire (Saône-et-Loire) in 1971. The Creusot-Loire group was liquidated in December 1984.

== See also ==
- Communes of the Nièvre department

== Sources ==
- Dassé, Pauline (2006), Société de Commentry, Fourchambault et Decazeville (59 Aq Et 1996 064 - 36 Mi) Inventaire Des Archives Photographiques (PDF) (in French), Centre Des Archives du Monde du Travail
- "Société de Commentry - Fourchambault", industrie.lu (in French)
