= Imphy =

- Commune
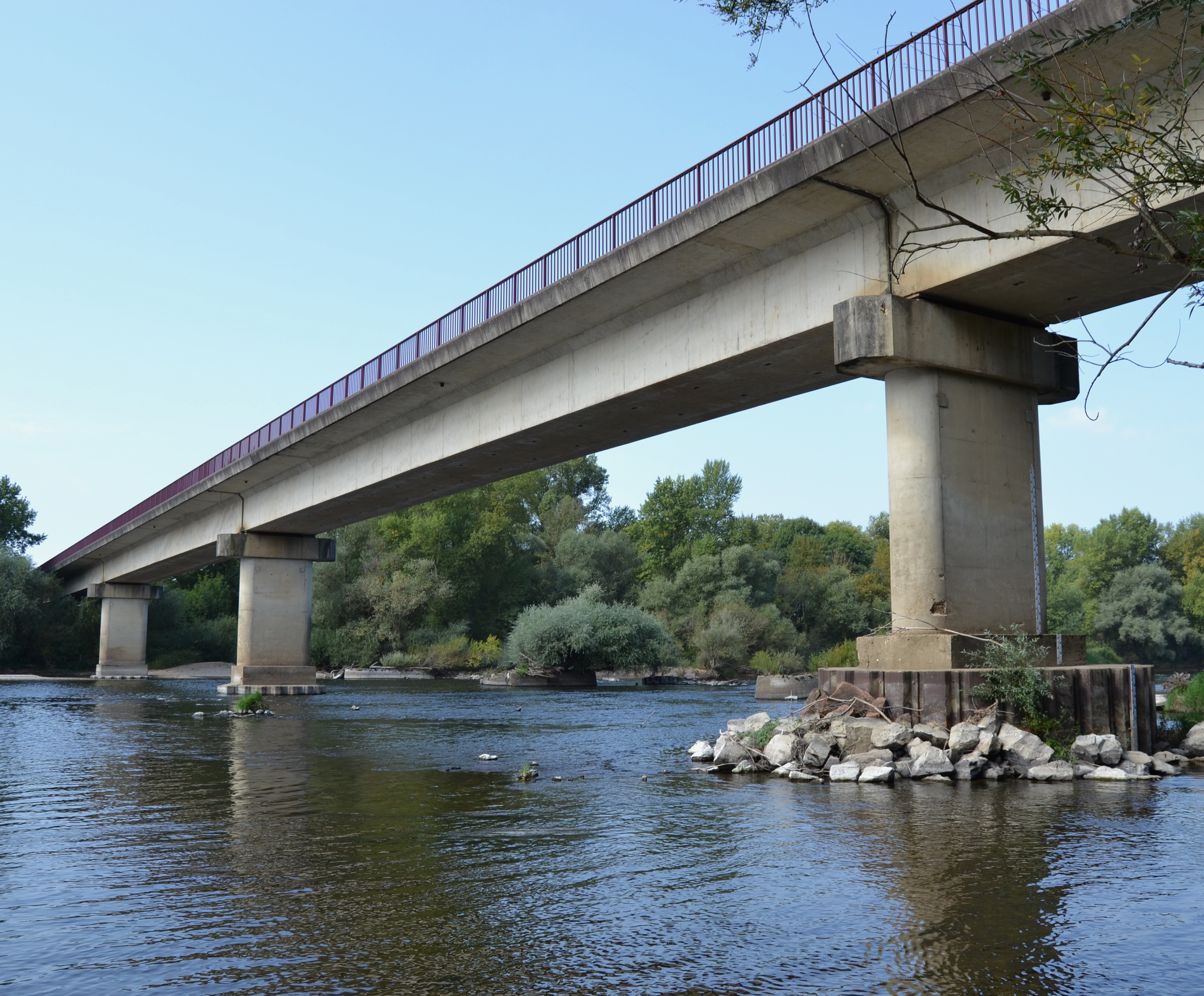
- The Imphy bridge across the Loire
- Location of Imphy
- Location within France Location within Bourgogne-Franche-Comté
- Coordinates: 46°55′45″N 3°15′43″E
- Country: France
- Region: Bourgogne-Franche-Comté
- Department: Nièvre
- Arrondissement: Nevers
- Canton: Imphy

Government
  - Mayor (2020–2026): Régine Roy
- Area^{1}: 16.62 km^{2} (6.42 sq mi)
- Highest elevation: 262 m (860 ft)
- Lowest elevation: 176 m (577 ft)
- Population (2023): 3,182
  - Density: 191.5/km^{2} (495.9/sq mi)
- Time zone: UTC+01:00 (CET)
  - Summer (DST): UTC+02:00 (CEST)
- INSEE/Postal code: 58134 /58160
- ^{1} French Land Register data, which excludes lakes, ponds, glaciers > 1 km^{2} (0.386 sq mi or 247 acres) and river estuaries.

Imphy (French pronunciation: [ɛ̃fi]) is a commune in the Nièvre department in Bourgogne-Franche-Comté, France.

== Industrial history ==
Imphy is known in particular for its steel-works, renowned for their special steels which were useful in particular for the north foot of the Eiffel Tower in 1889. The Société de Commentry, Fourchambault et Decazeville was formed in 1853 through a merger of the Fourchambault foundry, Imphy steelworks, Montluçon (Allier) foundry and Commentry (Allier) colliery. The Imphy steelworks was detached from the company and combined with the Saint-Seurin steelworks. They were adapted to use the Bessemer process. In 1869 the two steelworks were reunited with the company. In 1954 the company was renamed the Société métallurgique d'Imphy. In 1968 it was merged with the Société des forges et aciéries du Creusot, which in 1971 became Creusot-Loire. The combined company was in turn absorbed by Creusot-Loire (Saône-et-Loire) in 1971. The Creusot-Loire group was liquidated in December 1984.

== Demographics ==
Historical population
Year	Pop.	±% p.a.
1968	5,183	—
1975	4,678	−1.45%
1982	4,930	+0.75%
1990	4,478	−1.19%
1999	4,015	−1.21%
2007	3,764	−0.80%
2012	3,637	−0.68%
2017	3,345	−1.66%
2023	3,182	−0.83%
Source: INSEE

The fall in population since the 1990s is attributed to a decline in industrial activities in the area. At one time the factories of Imphy employed up to 3,000 workers. Today, they (ArcelorMittal and Aubert&Duval) employ only about 1,000 workers.

== Notable personalities ==
- Hubert Bourdot (Imphy, 30 October 1861 – 30 September 1937) was a French Roman Catholic priest and mycologist
- Charles Cliquet (Imphy, 21 January 1891 - Paris, 27 March 1956), member of French Resistance, Compagnon de la Libération
- Stéphane Faye (Imphy, 10 May 1867 - Saint-Avé, 15 November 1947), writer

== Imphy in the cinema ==
In Luc Moullet's short film, Imphy capitale de la France (1995), Moullet proposed making the town of Imphy the new capital of France, being ideally situated at the geographic centre of France.

== See also ==
- Communes of the Nièvre department
- Treasure of Imphy

== Sources ==
- Dassé, Pauline (2006), Société de Commentry, Fourchambault et Decazeville (59 Aq Et 1996 064 - 36 Mi) Inventaire Des Archives Photographiques (PDF) (in French), Centre Des Archives du Monde du Travail
- "Société de Commentry - Fourchambault", industrie.lu (in French)
