= Creusot-Loire =

- Company type: Subsidiary
- Industry: Rail transport
- Founded: 1970; 56 years ago
- Headquarters: Paris, France
- Area served: Worldwide
- Products: Steel

Creusot-Loire was a French engineering conglomerate, formed from factories in Le Creusot and Châteauneuf, Loire. The Creusot-Loire subsidiary of ArcelorMittal also includes an Innovation, Research and Development centre for the group.

== History ==
The group was formed in 1970 as a result of Compagnie des ateliers et forges de la Loire (owned by Marine-Firminy) and Société des Forges et Ateliers du Creusot (owned by Schneider) merger. The Société des Forges et Ateliers du Creusot had absorbed the Société métallurgique d'Imphy in 1968.

The enterprise developed what has become known as the Creusot-Loire Uddeholm (CLU) converter process, which was developed to minimize the need of argon, and which was first erected on an industrial scale in the 1970s at Degerfors.

The group was affected by the 1970s steel crisis, and was not able to pay a dividend after 1977.

In 1984 the organisation became bankrupt with debts of $633 million; the company's owner Empain-Schneider rejected state aid as the conditions included giving away control of another subsidiary Jeumont Industrie.

At some point near 2000, Imphy SA owned the Invar trademark.

At some point, the organization may have been part of Usinor, which became in the 2001/2 restructuring the company known as Arcelor.

Before September 2003, the organisation had been renamed Industeel and absorbed by Arcelor.

In September 2015, Industeel was touting its homogeneous armour products and its ballistic protection steel plates. It boasted that 5mm of its MARS 600 product could stop a NATO 7.62mm round at a distance of 10m.

By February 2018, the organization had been rebaptized Industeel France and was then owned by ArcelorMittal.

The French arm had been augmented by Industeel Belgium, which operated with 1200 employees in Charleroi.

In November 2020, ArcelorMittal had decided to sell the unit.
