= Hippolyte François Jaubert =

French politician and botanist

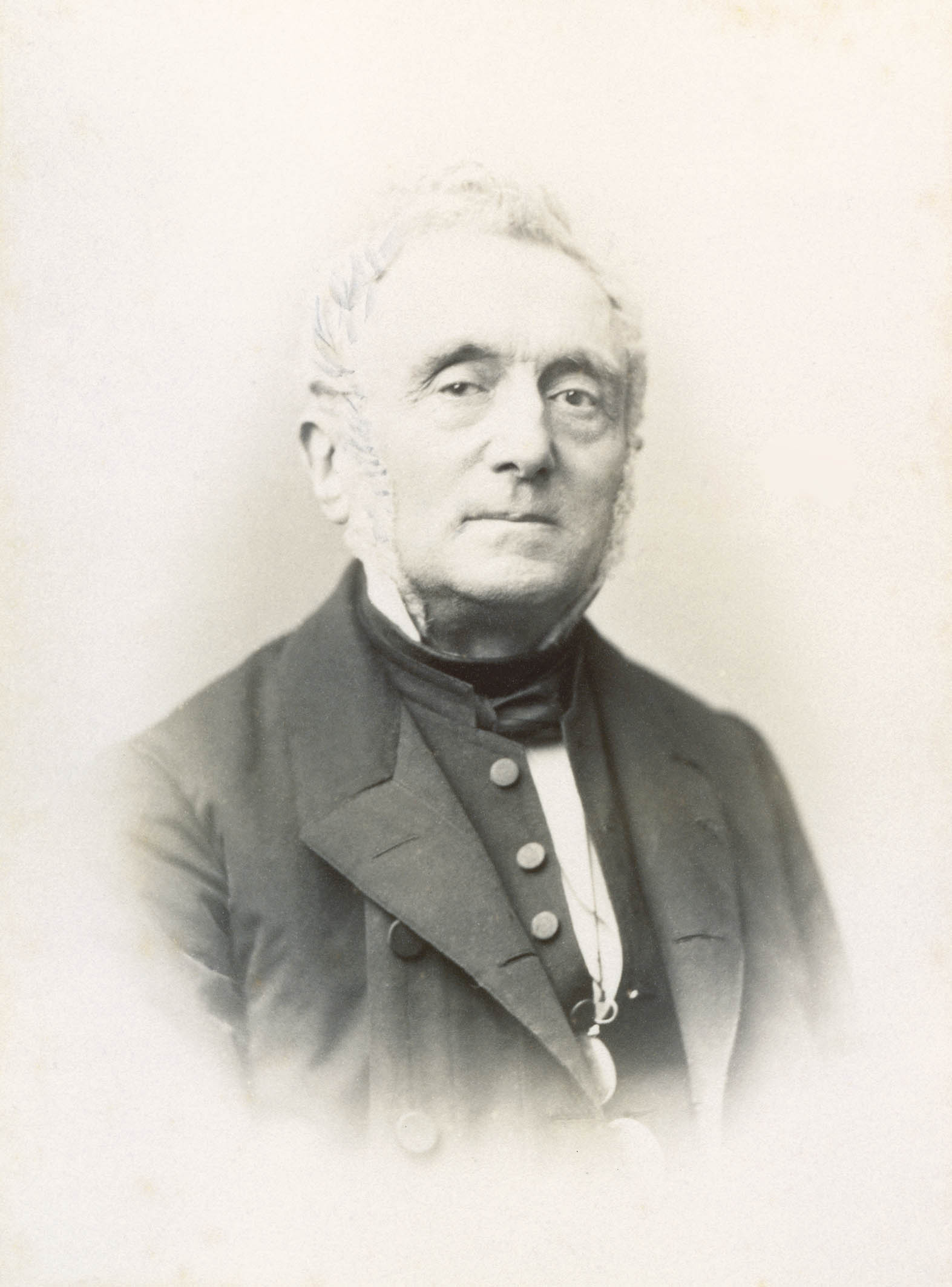
Hippolyte François Jaubert (1860)

Count Hippolyte François Jaubert (28 October 1798 – 5 December 1874) was a French politician and botanist. The standard author abbreviation Jaub. is used to indicate this person as the author when citing a botanical name.

Jaubert was born in Paris, the son of François Hippolyte Jaubert (a commissioner of the French Navy, killed at the Battle of the Nile in 1798) and Rosalie Mélanie Cheminade (a landowner at Givry, in the commune of Cours-les-Barres in the department of Cher, who died in 1817). He was adopted by his uncle, Count François Jaubert (1758–1822), Councilor of State and governor of the Bank of France under the First Empire. Although Jaubert was passionate about natural history, his uncle made him study law, while allowing him to study with René Desfontaines (1750–1831) and Antoine-Laurent de Jussieu (1748–1836). He was called to the bar in 1821, but shortly afterwards his uncle died, Jaubert inheriting the title of Count and an immense fortune. With this money he was able to buy large landholdings in Berry, ten blast furnaces in the departments of Nièvre and Cher (where his mother's family originated), and become director of the Chemin de Fer de Paris à Orléans (Paris–Orléans railway company), all the while concentrating on botany and politics.

He married Marie Boigues (died 1864), sister of Louis Boigues, a manufacturer at Imphy and founder of the town of Fourchambault. They had two children:

- Louis Hippolyte Francois Jaubert, who became prefect of the department of Sarthe;
- Claire Mélanie Jaubert, who became by her marriage Countess Benoist d'Azy.

In 1821 Jaubert toured Auvergne and Provence with his friend Victor Jacquemont (1801–1832), studying the flora and geology of those regions. That same year, together with Karl Sigismund Kunth (1788–1850), Adolphe Brongniart (1801–1876), Adrien-Henri de Jussieu (1797–1853), Jean Baptiste Antoine Guillemin (1796–1842) and Achille Richard (1794–1852), he founded the short-lived Natural History Society of Paris, which financed an expedition to Asia of several naturalists, among them Pierre Martin Rémi Aucher-Éloy (1793–1838).

He joined the conseil général of Cher in 1830, and became its president. He entered national politics at the time of the July Revolution of 1830, and was elected six times to the Chamber of Deputies of France, from 1831 to 1842. Initially close to the Doctrinaires, he quickly attached himself to prime minister Adolphe Thiers, and served in the latter's second administration as Minister of Public Works from 1 March to 28 October 1840.

During this period, the conservative deputy for Versailles, Ovide de Rémilly, put forward an old proposal of the Left, that members of the Chamber of Deputies should be forbidden from accepting salaried public positions during their term of service. This was a proposal that Thiers himself had supported while in opposition, so to avoid a display of public hypocrisy, Thiers sent Jaubert to negotiate for its deferment. Jaubert was hostile to this reform, and wrote to a number of conservative deputies asking them to help bury the proposal. One of Jaubert's letters was leaked to the press, causing an outcry on the Left and questions in the Chamber. However, the operation was successful and the proposition was rejected by the deputies on 15 June 1840.

Following the general election of 9 July 1842 Jaubert was briefly in opposition to the government, and voted against the indemnity proposed by François Guizot to be paid to Britain in compensation for the imprisonment of the missionary George Pritchard in Tahiti.

He was appointed to the Peerage of France on 27 November 1844.

He took no part in the Revolution of 1848, and under the Second Empire, he withdrew from political life, devoting himself to botany and business. He was elected to the French Academy of Sciences in 1858, and was among the founders of the Botanical Society of France in 1854.

Following the collapse of the Second Empire in 1870 and the creation of the Third Republic, Jaubert was elected representative of Cher in the National Assembly on 8 February 1871. From that date until his death at Montpellier in 1874, he devoted himself almost entirely to politics. He joined the Orléanist parliamentary group, Centre droit.

Using the herbarium that he collected and those of the National Museum of Natural History, and with the help of Édouard Spach (1801–1879), he published his Illustrationes plantarum orientalium ("illustrations of plants of the east"; five volumes; Roret, Paris, 1842–1857).

He was decorated Chevalier of the Légion d'honneur on 27 April 1830.
