= Gustave Maximilien Juste de Croÿ-Solre =

French cardinal

His Eminence Gustave Maximilien Juste de Croÿ-Solre
- Cardinal; Archbishop of Rouen
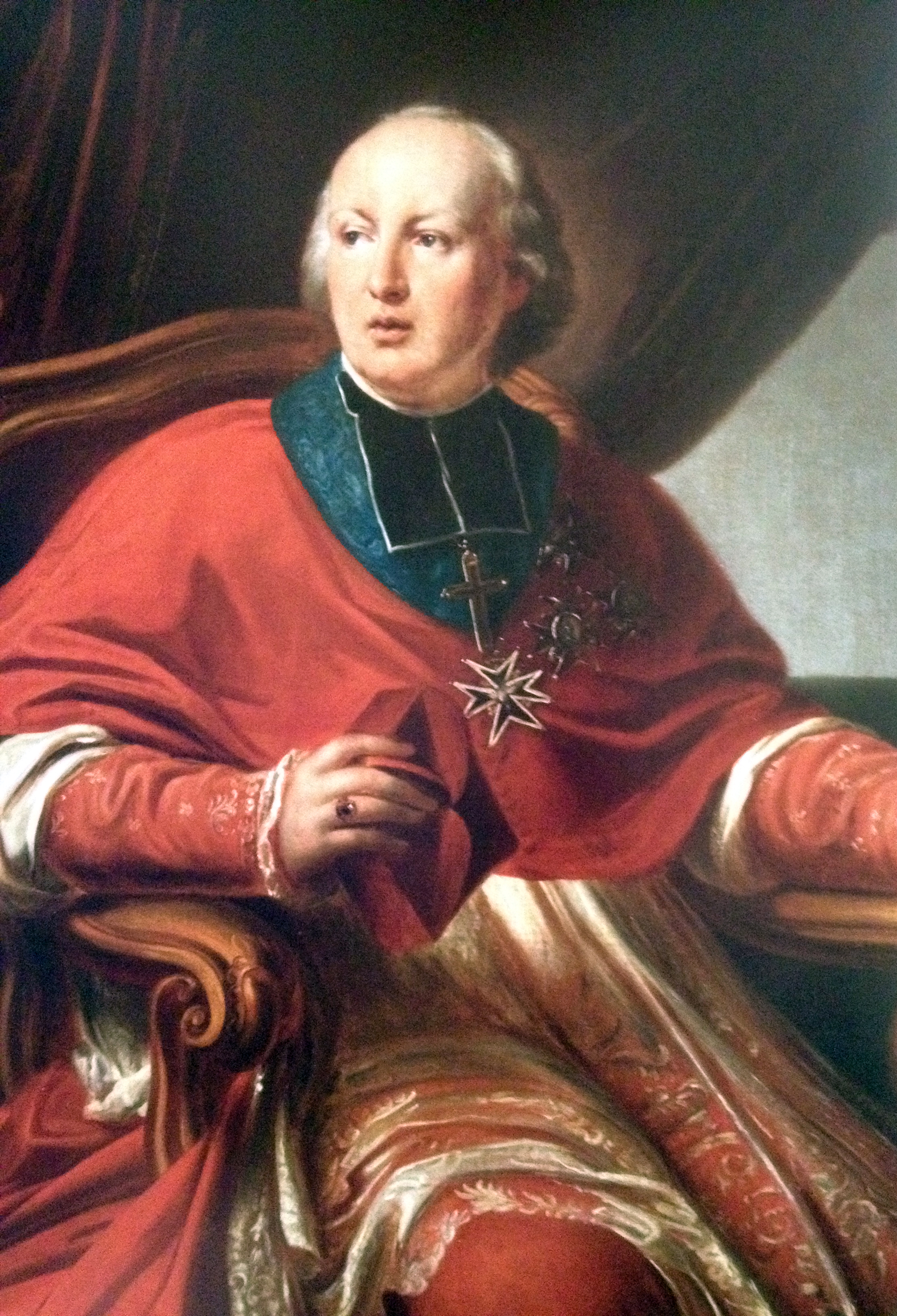
- Portrait by Hippolyte de Mahy, 1833
- Church: Roman Catholic
- Archdiocese: Rouen
- See: Notre Dame de Rouen
- Installed: 4 July 1823
- Term ended: 1 January 1844
- Predecessor: François de Pierre de Bernis
- Successor: Louis-Marie-Edmond Blanquart de Bailleul
- Other post: Bishop of Strasbourg

Personal details
- Born: 12 September 1773 Château de l'Ermitage, Condé-sur-l'Escaut, France
- Died: 1 January 1844 (aged 70) Rouen, France

Prince Gustave Maximilien Juste de Croÿ-Solre (12 September 1773 Château de l'Ermitage, near Condé-sur-l'Escaut, Nord - 1 January 1844 Rouen) was a French cardinal, Archbishop of Rouen, and a member of the House of Croy.

== Life ==
Gustave was the fifth of six sons born to Anne Emmanuel Ferdinand François, 8th Duke of Croy, and Princess Auguste Friederike Wilhelmine zu Salm-Kyrburg. In 1789, he was made a canon of the cathedral chapter of Strasbourg. During the French Revolution, he took refuge in Vienna, where he was ordained a priest on 3 November 1797.

=== Bishop ===
In 1814 he was made a chevalier of the Order of Saint-Louis. On 8 August 1817 he was appointed Bishop of Strasbourg by King Louis XVIII; the appointment was confirmed by Pope Pius VII on 23 August 1819. He was consecrated a bishop on 9 January 1820 at the Church of St. Sulpice in Paris by Jean-Charles de Coucy, Archbishop of Reims. The Prince of Croy embodied "the episcopate of the great lords" of the Restoration. He settled at the Palais Rohan and was addressed as "Prince" by the clergy. Pious, orthodox, and ultramontane, he was very supportive of the Bourbons.

In June 1820, he set out on a confirmation tour through the diocese; his simplicity and affability conquered all hearts. His knowledge of the German language facilitated his contacts with the population. From 1821 until 1830 Croy served as Grand Almoner of France, a position generally dominated by a few aristocratic families. Augustus Marie Martin, who would later become the first bishop of the Diocese of Natchitoches, worked under him while a seminarian.

Croy later served as the President of the Superior Council of the Society for the Propagation of the Faith. In 1821 he became an officer of the Légion d'honneur, and the following year a Peer of France. His duties kept him often absent from Strasbourg. In 1823, he was able to obtain the restitution of the church of Saint-Etienne; as for the buildings of the old Saint-Etienne abbey, which had served as a granary and then as a theater since the Revolution, he rented them for his junior seminary, until the diocese could purchase them. He invited the Jesuits to come and preach in Alsace.

=== Archbishop ===
On November 17, 1823 he became Archbishop of Rouen. In 1824 he assisted King Louis XVIII on his death bed and presided over his funeral in the Abbey of Saint-Denis.

On 21 March 1825 he was created a cardinal by Pope Leo XII. He did not receive the red hat until 18 May 1829. Three days later on 21 May 1829 he received the title Cardinal-Priest of Santa Sabina. In 1826, he appointed Pierre Coudrin his vicar general.

Victor Godefroy was ordained in 1829 and assigned to Saint-Léger-du-Bourg-Denis where he supervised extensive restoration of the sixteenth-century parish church. The archbishop admired the work so much that he had Godefroy oversee construction of a retirement home for priests in Bonsecours. As a reward Croy appointed him curé of Bonsecours. As the church was in disrepair, with the archbishop's support, Godefroy replaced it with the Basilique Notre-Dame de Bonsecours. Croy presided over the benediction in June 1841.

Cardinal Croy participated in the conclaves of 1829 and 1830-1831. He died of gout. His remains are buried in Rouen Cathedral.

Catholic Church titles
Preceded by Post Vacant previously Johann Peter Saurine	Bishop of Strasbourg; 1820-1823	Succeeded by Claudius Maria Paul Tharin
