= Bonsecours =

- Commune
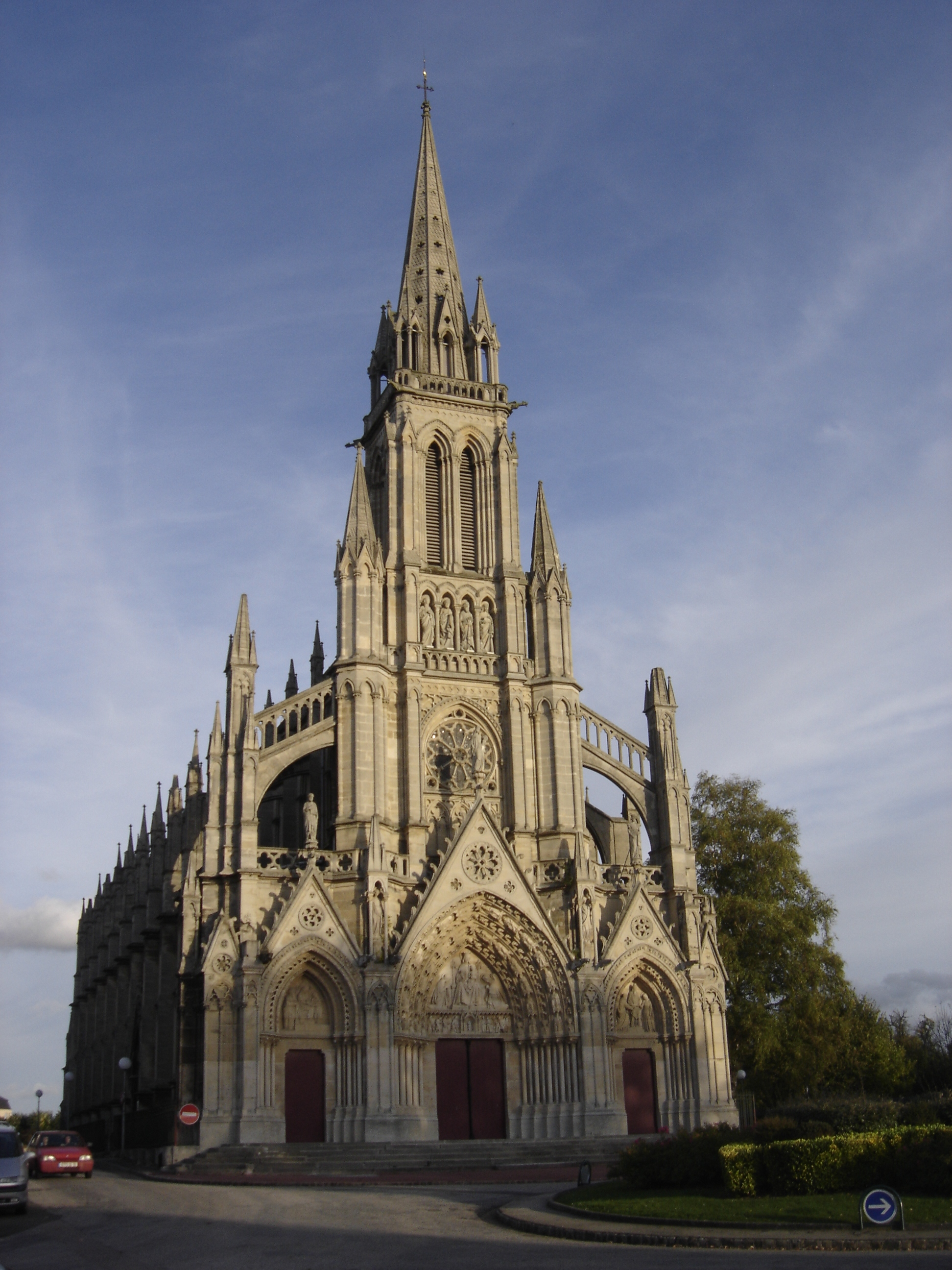
- The church in Bonsecours

- Coat of arms
- Location of Bonsecours
- Location within France Location within Normandy
- Coordinates: 49°26′N 1°08′E
- Country: France
- Region: Normandy
- Department: Seine-Maritime
- Arrondissement: Rouen
- Canton: Darnétal
- Intercommunality: Métropole Rouen Normandie

Government
  - Mayor (2026–32): Laurent Grelaud
- Area^{1}: 3.76 km^{2} (1.45 sq mi)
- Elevation: 150 m (490 ft)
- Highest elevation: 157 m (515 ft)
- Lowest elevation: 2 m (6.6 ft)
- Population (2023): 6,442
  - Density: 1,710/km^{2} (4,440/sq mi)
- Time zone: UTC+01:00 (CET)
  - Summer (DST): UTC+02:00 (CEST)
- INSEE/Postal code: 76103 /76240
- ^{1} French Land Register data, which excludes lakes, ponds, glaciers > 1 km^{2} (0.386 sq mi or 247 acres) and river estuaries.

Bonsecours (French pronunciation: [bɔ̃səkuʁ], before 1958: Blosseville-Bonsecours) is a commune in the Seine-Maritime department in the Normandy region in northern France.

== Geography ==
A southern residential suburb of Rouen situated at the junction of the D6014, D6105 and the D95 roads. A little light industry takes place by the banks of the river Seine, the commune's westerly border.

== Heraldry ==
Arms of Bonsecours	The arms of Bonsecours are blazoned: Or, 3 crosses (couped) sable within a bordure gules.

== Population ==
Historical population
Year	Pop.	±% p.a.
1968	3,806	—
1975	5,435	+5.22%
1982	6,108	+1.68%
1990	6,898	+1.53%
1999	6,853	−0.07%
2007	6,836	−0.03%
2012	6,510	−0.97%
2017	6,462	−0.15%
2023	6,442	−0.05%
Source: INSEE

== Places of interest ==
- The Basilique Notre-Dame de Bonsecours, dating from the nineteenth century.
- An eighteenth-century Château de Bagnères.
- Vestiges of Saint-Michel's priory.
- The World War I Belgian Military Cemetery and memorial.
- Remains of fortifications dating from the eighth century onwards.
- The Côte Sainte Catherine offering panoramic views of Rouen, the Seine, and neighbouring communes and suburbs, and a natural environment containing numerous relatively rare flora and fauna in the chalk meadows on the hillside.

The Servant of God, Reverend Father Jacques Hamel, murdered by ISIS in July 2016, is buried in Bonsecours.

== Notable people ==
- Anny Duperey, French actress, was born here.
- José-Maria de Heredia (1842–1905), a poet, is buried here.

== See also ==
- Communes of the Seine-Maritime department
