= Joseph Périer =

French businessman

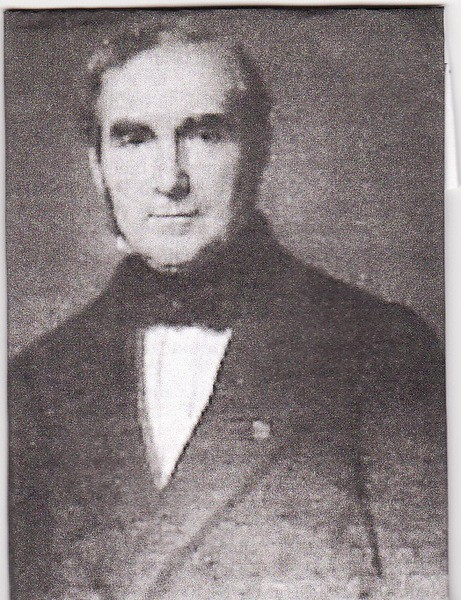

Deputy for Marne
- In office 15 November 1832 – 24 February 1848

Personal details
- Born: André Jean Joseph Périer; 28 November 1786 Grenoble, Isère, Kingdom of France
- Died: 18 December 1868 (aged 82) Paris, France
- Occupation: Businessman, politician

Joseph Périer (28 November 1786 – 18 December 1868) was a French businessman involved in banking and mining. His brother, Casimir Pierre Périer, served as Prime Minister of France. Joseph Périer was extremely wealthy, perhaps the richest man in France, mainly from his coal mining interests. He served in the Chamber of Deputies for 16 years during the July Monarchy.

== Early life ==
André Jean Joseph Périer was born on 28 November 1786 in Grenoble, Isère. His parents were Claude Périer (1742–1802) and Marie-Charlotte Pascal (1749–1821). Claude Périer was a fabric manufacturer from Grenoble who became a wealthy banker and one of the fifteen founding regents of the Bank of France. Joseph Périer was the ninth son of Claude Périer, and his twelfth child. One of his brothers was Casimir Pierre Périer, a banker in Paris who became prime minister of France.

In 1795 Claude Périer obtained 27.5 deniers of the Anzin Mining Company during a financial reorganization. When he died in 1801 his shares were divided between his eight sons and two daughters. In 1805 Scipion Périer became director of the mining company, and Casimir Périer became assistant director.

In 1809 Joseph Périer married Aglaé de Clavel de Kergoman (1790–1848) in Paris. Their children were Edmond (1811–76), Mathilde (1815–77), Laure (1816–27), Camille (1819–98), Octavie (1824–1904), Gabrielle (1828–77) and Arthur (1832–99).

== First French Empire ==
In 1811 Joseph Périer was named auditor to the Conseil d'Etat (France), and in that role was placed in charge of the Ponts-et-Chaussées (Bridges & Roads). Also in 1811 he was sent as sub-prefect to Oldenburg. At the start of Napoleon's German campaign of 1813 he was attached to Pierre Antoine Noël Bruno, comte Daru, Intendant General of the Grande Armée. After the capture of Dresden and the entry of the French army into Silesia he was chosen as Intendant of the Crossen Circle, and later as Receiver-General of the Grande Armée. He returned to France after the Battle of Leipzig, and was sent to Lille under Senator Jacques-Pierre Orillard de Villemanzy, extraordinary commissioner of the 16th military division. He did not return to Paris until after the Bourbon Restoration.

== Business career ==
After the Bourbon Restoration, Joseph Périer was for some years receiver of finances of the 4th arrondissement of Paris, then retired to private life. In 1825 he became the partner of his brother Casimir Périer in the Périer frères banking house of Paris, of which he later became the sole head. This bank had been created by Claude Périer in 1801. He was a regent of the Bank of France in the 11th seat from 1833 to his death. The Bank of France had in theory five regents chosen from the merchants and manufacturers and seven from the bankers, as well as three censors with an advisory role selected from the Paris merchants. In practice, the distinctions were blurred, since the merchants and manufacturers often engaged in banking, while Périer and others designated as "bankers" were primarily industrialists. A biographer said of him, "He is a man endowed with a precious quality, he counts a bag of a thousand francs faster than one of the boys of the Bank; so he is a regent!". Grenoble was one of the first cities to obtain a branch of the Bank of France, in 1840, due to the combined efforts of Alphonse and Joseph Périer.

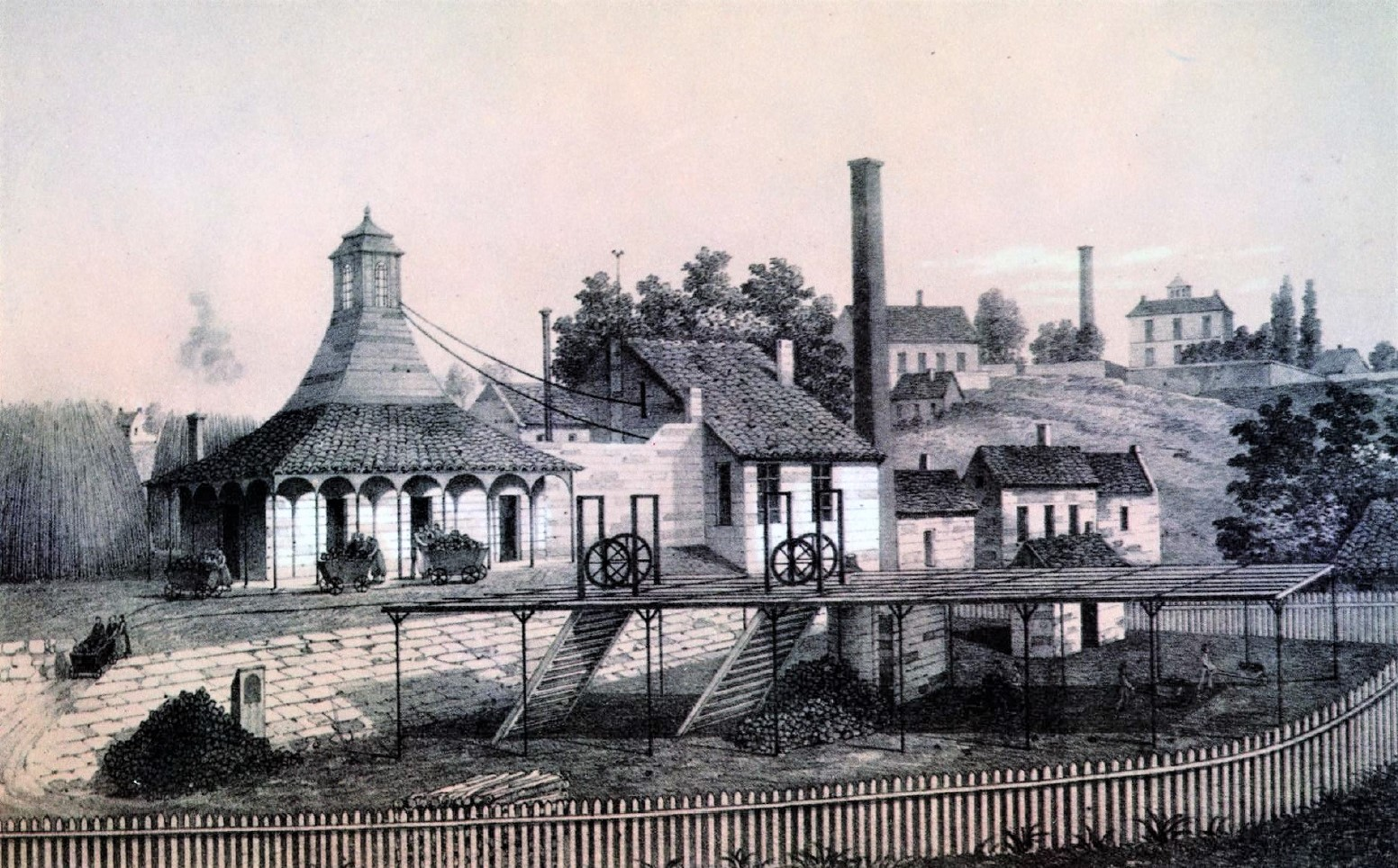
Chauffour mine at Anzin around 1840

When Scipion Périer died in 1821, Casimir Périer became director of the Anzin mines and Joseph Périer became assistant director. Joseph became director after Casimir died in 1832, and Casimir's son Auguste became assistant director. The Périers held a large block of shares in the company, and their bank managed the company's finances, including investments, changes in shareholdings and loans to shareholders. The machine shops of Jacques Périer at Chaillot supplied steam engines and equipment for mining from 1818.

Joseph Périer was concerned that productivity might suffer if the mines supervisory staff became too close to the workers. In 1826 he asked the general agent of the Anzin company "to arrange a kind of police that would inform him if the director, the under-director and the master foremen were doing their job." The census of 1842 shows that Périer may have been the most wealthy property-owner in France, paying 56,503 francs, mostly for the Anzin mines. (Note: In 1840 to be eligible for the Chamber of Deputies a man had to own property paying 500 francs. There were 56,000 Frenchmen who met this qualification in 1840. Joseph Périer had more than 100 times the required amount.) The Joseph Périer mine was opened in 1841, and reached coal at 75 metres (246 ft). By 1867 it had reached a depth of 380 metres (1,250 ft).

Joseph succeeded Casimir Périer as a member of the Paris Chamber of Commerce and participated in the Society for the Encouragement of National Industry. The Association pour la défense du Travail national was formed to oppose the lowering of tariffs. In 1845 it was joined by the committee of metallurgists. The council included Antoine Odier (President), Auguste Mimerel (Vice-President), Joseph Périer (Treasurer) and Louis-Martin Lebeuf (Secretary). Members included Henri Barbet, Léon Talabot and Eugène Schneider.

== Political career ==
During the July Revolution of 1830 Joseph Périer played a leading role in quieting a crowd that was on the point of attacking some disarmed soldiers who had taken refuge in the Foreign Ministry. He was a member of the General Council of the Seine department. In 1832, the General Council of the Seine department appointed him member of the commission charged with examining various projects of the entrepôt réel (public warehouse) in Paris. On 7 June 1832 he was appointed a member of the Superior Council of Commerce.

During the July Monarchy Joseph Périer was elected on 15 November 1832 as deputy for Épernay, the 4th district of the Marne department, as a member of the conservative majority. He replaced Joseph Dominique, baron Louis, who had chosen to run for another district. He was reelected on 21 June 1834. He supported François Guizot in his opposition to the ministry of Louis-Mathieu Molé. Joseph Périer was reelected on 4 November 1837 and 2 March 1839, still with the government majority. He was reelected on 9 July 1842, sitting with the constitutional opposition, and reelected on 1 August 1846. He left office on 24 February 1848 when the chamber of deputies was dissolved with the French Revolution of 1848.

After leaving office Joseph Périer was appointed vice-president of the central committee of primary education. He was in turn supervisor of the Caisse d'Amortissement and of the Depots et Consignations. Joseph Périer was named censor of the Société Générale in 1864, and was asked to join the board in January 1868. He died on 18 December 1868 in Paris.

== Sources ==
- André, Jean, Joseph Perier (in French), Assemblée nationale
- Barker, Richard J. (June 1961), "French Entrepreneurship During the Restoration: The Record of a Single Firm, the Anzin Mining Company", The Journal of Economic History, 21 (2), Cambridge University Press on behalf of the Economic History Association: 161–178, doi:10.1017/S0022050700101949, JSTOR 2115186
- Bonin, Hubert (2006), Histoire de la Société générale (in French), Librairie Droz, ISBN 978-2-600-01038-2
- Choulet, Eugène (1894), "André-Jean-Joseph Perier", La famille Casimir-Perier: étude généalogique, biographique et historique, d'après des documents des archives de Grenoble, de Vizille et de l'Isère (in French), Joseph Baratier
- Dormoy, Émile (1867), Topographie souterraine du bassin houiller de Valenciennes (in French), Imprimerie impériale
- Fohlen, Claude (September 1955), "Du nouveau sur la revolution industrielle en France", Revue économique (in French), 6 (5), Sciences Po University Press: 800–808, doi:10.2307/3497553, JSTOR 3497553
- Gille, Bertrand (1968), La Sidérurgie française au XIXe siècle: Recherches histioriques (in French), Librairie Droz, ISBN 978-2-600-04046-4
- Reid, Donald (October 1985), "Industrial Paternalism: Discourse and Practice in Nineteenth-Century French Mining and Metallurgy", Comparative Studies in Society and History, 27 (4), Cambridge University Press: 579–607, doi:10.1017/S0010417500011671, JSTOR 178593
- Robert, Adolphe; Cougny, Gaston (1889), "Périer (André-Jean-Joseph)", Dictionnaire des parlementaires français de 1789 à 1889 (in French)
- The Foreign Quarterly Review, Treuttel, 1847
- Tudesq, A.-J. (1961), "La Banque de France au milieu du XIX e siècle. Étude des structures sociales", Revue Historique (in French), 226 (2), Presses Universitaires de France, JSTOR 40949498
- Turnbull, D. (1830), The French Revolution of 1830: The Events which Produced It, and the Scenes by which it was Accompanied, H. Colburn and R. Bentley
