= Auguste Mimerel =

French politician

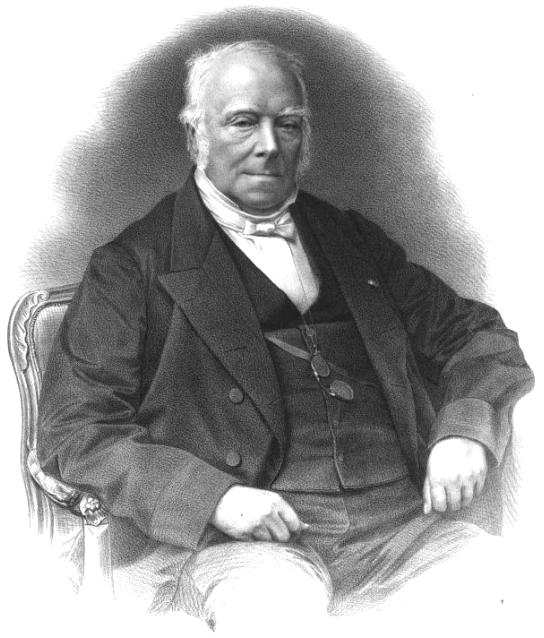
- Auguste Mimerel in 1867

Deputy for Nord
- In office 13 May 1849 – 2 December 1851

Senator for Nord
- In office 26 January 1852 – 4 September 1870

Personal details
- Born: Pierre Auguste Rémy Mimerel; 1 June 1786 Amiens, Somme, France
- Died: 16 April 1871 (aged 84) Roubaix, Nord
- Occupation: Industrialist, politician

Auguste Mimerel (1 June 1786 – 16 April 1871) was a French industrialist and politician. He was owner of a large cotton mill, and was active in industry associations. He supported the use of child labor, and was in favor of high tariffs to protect domestic industry. He became a deputy in the legislature in the short-lived French Second Republic, then a senator during the Second French Empire. In 1867 he was made a Count of the Empire.

== Early years: Revolution and Empire (1786–1814) ==
Auguste Mimerel was born on 1 June 1786 in St Firmin-en-Castillon, Amiens, Somme. He came from a provincial bourgeois family. He was the third of six children of Antoine Firmin Mimerel (1750–1828) and Guillaine Françoise Florence Le Bas (1761–1830). On 11 May 1809, in Paris, he married Marie-Joséphine Flahaut, daughter of Adrien Joseph Flahaut. They had two children, Antoine Auguste Edouard Mimeral (1812–81) and Caroline Augustine Joséphine Mimerel (1816–97). Mimerel was a tall man at 1.92 metres (6 ft 4 in) with powerful shoulders, grey-eyed, highly intelligent, and dominating.

== Bourbon Restoration (1814–1830) ==
The Mimerels moved to Roubaix, a small town outside Lille with just over 8,000 inhabitants, on 7 April 1816. Auguste Mimerel was 30 and had been working in the textile trade for twelve years. He was given the opportunity to partner with Théodore Delaoutre's textile trading company, Filature Delaoutre, which soon became the Delaoutre-Mimerel company. Mimerel created one of the largest cotton mills in the Nord department.

In 1824 Mimerel created the Committee of Spinners of Lille to defend protection of their industry. His views were Malthusian and could be summarized as "low investment, few exports and high tariffs." He was in turn President of the Conseil des Prud'hommes (1827), President of the Consultative Chamber of Manufactures (1828) and Municipal Councilor of Roubaix (1830). Just before the July Revolution of 1830 the Prefect of the Nord identified Mimerel and his brother, a justice of the peace, as "leaders of the hostile party" in Roubaix. That is, they were liberal and opposed to the Bourbon monarchy.

== July Monarchy (1830–1848) ==
After the July Revolution Mimerel retained liberal principles at first. As late as the fall of 1832 Mimerel, as President of the Consultative Chamber of Arts and Manufactures of Roubaix, was opposed to the seizure of foreign wool by customs, because "it would be against the spirit and needs of the century, which both demand new commercial freedoms rather than new constraints." During 1833–34 he became fully converted to protectionism. Mimerel was the most vocal of the industrialists during the commercial inquiry organized by Tanneguy Duchâtel in October–November 1834. He spoke as Mayor of Roubaix and Chamber of Commerce delegate for Lille, Roubaix and Tourcoing. He said, "Lifting prohibition will compromise the existence of considerable numbers of French citizens." He fiercely defended industrial liberty within France and opposed repeal of protection against foreign goods. He said national producers must show solidarity, and there would be revolts by the workers if British goods were allowed in.

Auguste Mimerel was mayor of Roubaix from 9 April 1834 to 7 July 1836. He was made a Knight of the Legion of Honour in 1834. He was General Councilor of Nord (1837), President of the council (1839) and President of the General Council of Manufactures in Paris (1840).

In 1835 Mimerel stated publicly that half of the workers in his cotton mill in Lille were children. They usually started work at the age of eight, often earlier, had the same hours as adults and had no schooling or protection of any form. He clearly thought that employment was better than limited schooling and long periods of idleness. In his 1840 Tableau Louis-René Villermé described child labor conditions in the textile industry as "too terrible to be endured". In 1841 the work of Villermé, the report of Alexandre Loiset on insanitary housing in Lille and the intervention of Villeneuve-Bargemont led to a law regulating child labour. The employers of Nord were particularly hostile to the bill, saying that although the children worked long hours their work was not tiring, and it was not possible to separate the work of adults and children. It was unjust to blame industrialists for working-class pauperism. In an open letter of 1841 entitled Pauperism, its increase attributed to industry in a host of writings, Mimerel pointed out that pauperism existed before the industrial revolution, and it was normal for it to be found among workers. He said that manufacturers showed humanity and charity by founding hospices and setting up canteens for their workers.

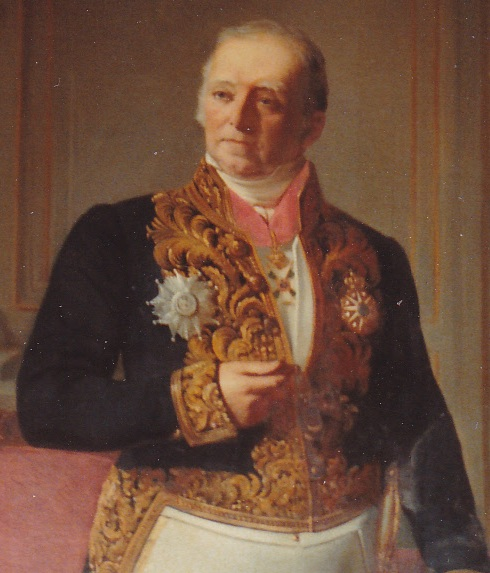
Mimerel as a senator

The Comité pour la Défense du Travail National was founded in 1842 in an effort to coordinate the protectionist manufacturers' lobbies. Mimerel was the main mover. He influenced the lobbies to stress self-sufficiency rather than rivalry with foreigners, and to subsidize the mainstream press to promote protectionism. In his Du paupérisme dans ses rapports avec l'industrie en France et en Angleterre (Lille, 1842) Mimerel tried to show that protection mostly favoured the workers rather than just a few privileged manufacturers. He noted that "the hideous wound of pauperism" was mostly found in British cities. Britain depended on foreign markets as outlets for its cheap textiles, so was vulnerable to any downturns in these markets and had reduced its workers to a state of "abject destitution". He argued that "if foreign labour cannot access our market, workers, rare in relation to the number of machines, will receive constant and high salaries for a long time." He also blamed economists and socialists for spreading "moral poverty" rather than "real destitution", where raised expectations caused the workers to see a satisfactory condition as unbearable.

Du paupérisme portrayed Britain as an aristocratic society in which the privileged classes used the workers only as tools of production, in contrast to the more egalitarian society of France. In fact, at this time social legislation was more advanced in Britain and workers earned more than in France. Also, French exports were growing rapidly. However, there may be an element of truth in the idea that French industrialization was slower but less brutal than in Britain. Mimerel wrote that "sedition has almost always been fomented by the better paid. They are motivated much less by misery than by economic ideas and proposals for social reform which they would have been much happier to have known nothing about. ... not that we want to impose limits on the instruction of the people, but we would prefer whatever restores to the individual a sense of contentment with his position in society and encourages him to improve it by means of orderliness and work, rather than ideas which lead him to ruin himself in pointless complaints and in unrealistic projects."

In 1846 the Association for the Defense of National Labor (ADTN: Association pour la défense du travail national) was formed to oppose the lowering of tariffs. The ADTN created a newspaper, Le Moniteur Industriel, that aggressively denounced "libre-échange". Local committees were founded and protests organized against attempts to copy British policies. Most manufacturers backed the ADTN campaign, as did grain producers and even some shippers. The ADTN brought together the four major employers associations: coal mines, eastern industrialists, metallurgists and machine makers. The association had a central committee, an office and a director based in Paris, ordinary members and about 40 local committees. The association's council in 1847 included Antoine Odier (President), Auguste Mimerel (vice-president), Joseph Périer (Treasurer) and Louis-Martin Lebeuf (Secretary). Members included Henri Barbet, Léon Talabot and Eugène Schneider. The Association was opposed to the reform of the customs system advocated by Laurent Cunin-Gridaine. In 1846 Jules Hochet, iron master at Fourchambault, became a member of the association.

Mimerel was made an Officer of the Legion of Honor (1846). He ran for election to the legislature on 1 August 1846 for the 3rd constituency of Nord (Lille) but was defeated.

== French Second Republic (1848–1851) ==
Auguste Mimerel supported the French Revolution of 1848. During the French Second Republic he was a deputy for Nord from 13 May 1849 to 2 December 1851 on the Bonapartist platform. He supported the policy of Napoleon III. Mimerel was president of the ADTN in 1849. He succeeded in excluding foreign products from the Exposition des produits de l'industrie française of 1849.

== Second Empire (1851–1870) ==
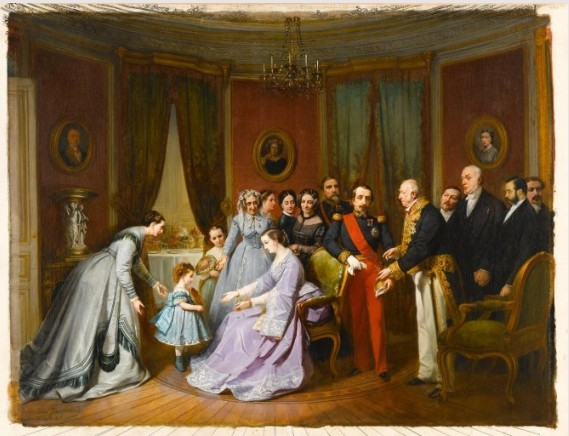
The emperor and empress being received by Mimerel in 1867

In the Second French Empire Auguste Mimerel was made a senator on 26 January 1852, holding office until the fall of the empire. He was made a Commander of the Legion of Honour in 1852. He was a member of the jury of the Exposition Universelle (1855).

The ADTN lasted until 1860, when the Franco-British Cobden–Chevalier Treaty of 1860 liberalized trade between the two countries. Arguing against the treaty, Mimerel pointed out that if France had been dependent on English coal she would have been vulnerable to an embargo during the Franco-Austrian War of 1859. However, although bad for textile manufacturers, the treaty did less damage to coal and steel interests. Auguste Mimerel resigned and the association disintegrated, leaving the great employers' federations to go their own ways. Mimerel became president of the General Council of Nord in 1860, and stopped attacking government policy. He was made a Grand Officer of the Legion of Honour in 1863. In 1863 Mimerel encouraged Belgian workers to move to France so wages could be pushed down.

At the start of 1869 Gustave Masure published articles in the republican Progrès du Nord that attacked Mimerel. They accused the senator of having usurped noble titles that he did not legally possess, but the main criticism was a speech by Mimerel, read for him in the Senate by Dumay, in which he glorified free trade. Mimerel had completely changed his position, and said, "It is no exaggeration to say that French industry will not perish, In the midst of our trials discouragement never entered our hearts." He now spoke of an invigorated industry and the welfare of the workmen. Soon after the speech was read, Mimerel was made a Count of the Empire, in what Masure saw as a reward for his change. It is possible that Mimerel never had strong convictions, but simply behaved in public in a way that would help him rise socially. Mimerel sat with the Bonapartist majority in the Senate until the revolution of 4 September 1870 during the Franco-Prussian War. He died on 16 April 1871 in Roubaix, Nord.

== Sources ==
- Capet, Antoine (2009-10-02), The Representation of Working People in Britain and France: New Perspectives, Cambridge Scholars Publishing, ISBN 978-1-4438-1534-5
- Déniel, Patrick (2 February 2013), "La difficile naissance du patronat français", L'Usine Nouvelle (in French)
- Dunham, Arthur L. (November 1943), "Industrial Life and Labor in France 1815-1848", The Journal of Economic History, 3 (2), Cambridge University Press on behalf of the Economic History Association: 117–151, doi:10.1017/S0022050700083522, JSTOR 2113493
- Fohlen, Claude (May 1956), "Bourgeoisie française liberte economique et intervention de l'Etat", Revue économique (in French), 7 (3), Sciences Po University Press: 414–428, doi:10.2307/3497777, JSTOR 3497777
- Mairie de Roubaix, Les maires de Roubaix (in French)
- Mas, Gabriel (2007), "3. Le monde du travail dans la région du Nord : les mêmes enjeux?", Le cardinal de Bonald et la question du travail (1840-1870) (thesis), Université Lumière Lyon 2
- Pennetier, Roger, "Pierre Rémy Auguste MIMEREL", Geneanet (in French)
- Petitpas, Philippe (December 2003), Les industriels du coton et le Traité de commerce franco-anglais de 1860 (PDF) (thesis) (in French), Université de Montréal
- Pierre, Auguste, Rémy Mimerel (in French), Assemblée nationale
- Price, Roger (2004-06-17), People and Politics in France, 1848–1870, Cambridge University Press, ISBN 978-1-139-45448-3
- Priouret, Roger (1992-02-04), Origines du patronat français, Grasset, ISBN 978-2-246-79486-8
- Robert, Adolphe; Cougny, Gaston (1889–1891), "Mimerel (Pierre Auguste Rémy)", Biographie extraite du dictionnaire des parlementaires français de 1789 à 1889 (in French), vol. IV
- Schaeffer, Bernard (2017-07-14), Madame reçoit: La vie intime d'une gouvernante dans le nord au XIXe, Éditions Ravet-Anceau, ISBN 978-2-35973-207-8
- The Foreign Quarterly Review, Treuttel, 1847
- Todd, David (2008-10-15), L'identité économique de la France (in French), Grasset, ISBN 978-2-246-71189-6
- Todd, David (2015-04-30), Free Trade and its Enemies in France, 1814–1851, Cambridge University Press, ISBN 978-1-107-03693-2
