= Antoine Odier =

French banker and politician

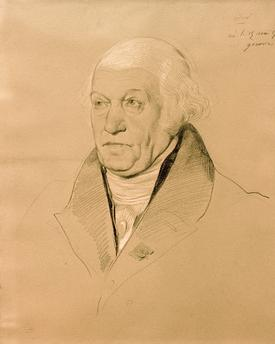
- Portrait by Eugène Devéria

Chamber of Deputies of the Departments
- In office 24 November 1827 – 16 May 1830

Chamber of Deputies
- In office 19 July 1830 – 3 October 1837

Personal details
- Born: 15 May 1766 Geneva, Republic of Geneva
- Died: 19 August 1853 (aged 87) Paris, France
- Occupation: Banker, politician

Antoine Odier (15 May 1766 – 19 August 1853) was a French banker and politician. He was born in the Republic of Geneva but moved to France and was naturalized during the French Revolution (1789–99). He was involved in the Indian cotton trade before founding a banking house in Paris during the Bourbon Restoration. He was politically liberal, supported the July Revolution of 1830 and opposed the seizure of power by Louis-Napoléon Bonaparte in 1851. He favoured protectionist economic policies, and led a lobby group to oppose lowering of tariffs.

== Family background ==
Antoine Odier's family, which originated in the Dauphiné, was part of the "old nobility" (ancienne noblesse). An ancestor, also named Antoine Odier, took refuge in Geneva shortly before the end of the 17th century, fleeing religious persecution resulting from the revocation of the Edict of Nantes. The Odiers became related by marriage with patrician families in Geneva, and associated with leading merchants. Odier's father, Jacques-Antoine Odier, appears to have played an important role in Senn, Bidermann et Cie. This company had been established in 1781 with the purpose of manufacturing Indian cotton at Wesserling, and trading in painted canvasses in three export outlets. When the other leaders of this company moved from Geneva in 1782 to France and Belgium, he was given power of attorney for their affairs in Geneva.

== Business career ==
Antoine Odier was born on 15 May 1766 in Geneva. He was the son of Jacques-Antoine Odier by his second wife, Marie Cazenove. At a very young age he entered the commercial house of Senn, Bidermann et Cie. Some years before the French Revolution he was given charge of the Ostend outlet, which he transferred to Lorient in 1791 after the suppression of the monopoly of the Compagnie des Indes. Odier became a Frenchman under the law of 1790, which gives this status to the descendants of refugees. He supported the Girondins, and was arrested in 1793. He was not released until the Thermidorian Reaction of 27 July 1794.

After being released Odier moved to Ostend to look after the company's business, then to Hamburg, where he married Susanne Boué, who was like him a descendant of Protestant French refugees. His children were Henriette (b. 1796), Jacques-Antoine (b. 1798), who later became a judge at the court of commerce, a regent of the Bank of France (Note: His son Jacques-Antoine Odier (1798–1864), known as James Odier, was a Regent of the Bank of France from 1849 to 1857.) and a member of the Central Council of Reformed Churches, Edouard-Alexandre (b. 1800), who left commerce to become a painter, Alfred-Auguste (b. 1802), Charles-Philippe (b. 1804), Cécile and Jenny, who both died young and Edmond-Louis (b. 1813).

After returning to France he found that maritime commerce was completely ruined by the British Continental System. He devoted himself to developing the national industry, and from this time forward the manufacture of painted canvas was very successful. From 1795 Odier was one of the main directors of the company that took over the Wesserling Indian cotton manufacture under the name "Gros, Davillier, Roman et Cie", which soon became "Gros, Davillier, Odier et Cie". In 1803 Antoine Odier and his father were among the ten associates of the firm Gros, Davillier et Cie. Antoine Odier was also involved in companies with his two brothers-in-law, and with important merchants such as Jacques Bidermann of Winterthur.

Odier's fortune and influence grew considerably during the Bourbon Restoration. He founded a banking house in Paris. Odier's bank, established during the Bourbon Restoration (1815–30), was part of the elite group known as the Parisian Haute Banque. Others established at this time were those of Ardoin fr , Dassier, d’Eichthal fr, Vernes fr and de Waru fr. Odier's bank survived just two generations. He became a member of the Paris Commercial Court, and then president of that court. He was appointed a censor of the Bank of France, a member of the Supervisory Board of the Sinking Fund and of deposits and consignations, and a member of the Superior Council of Commerce in 1819.

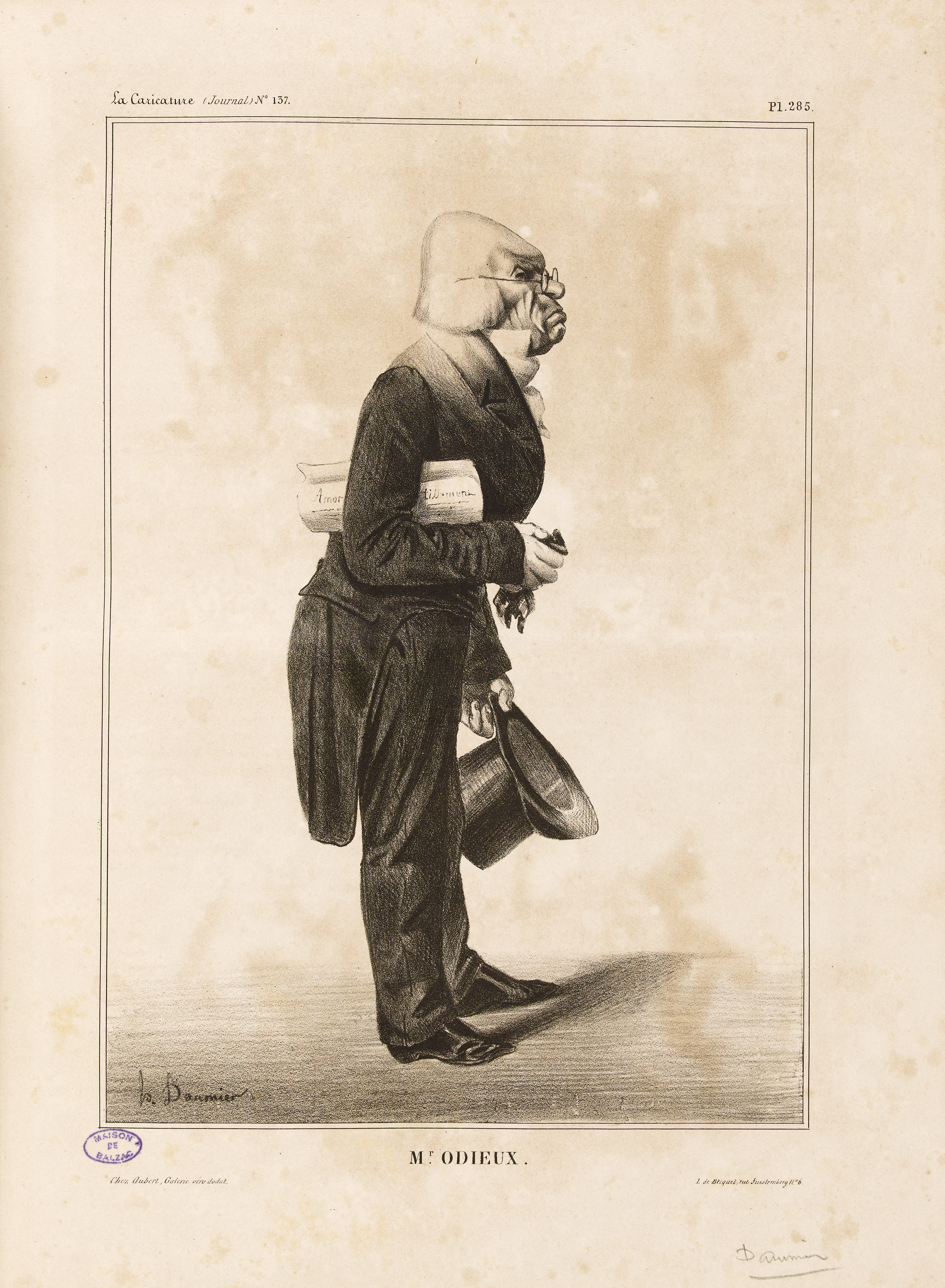
"M. Odieux" (Odier) by Honoré Daumier from La Caricature 1833

== Political career ==
During the Bourbon Restoration Odier sat in the Chamber of Deputies of the Departments from 24 November 1827 to 16 May 1830. He represented the Seine department as a member of the liberal opposition. During the July Revolution he voted for the Address of the 221, supported the government and supported the policies of Jacques Laffitte and Casimir Pierre Périer. During the July Monarchy he was elected to the Chamber of Deputies for the Seine as a member of the liberal opposition, holding office from 19 July 1830 to 31 May 1831.

Odier became a general councilor of the Seine in 1831. He was reelected Deputy for the Seine for the government majority from 5 July 1831 to 25 May 1834, and again from 21 June 1834 to 3 October 1837. The Association pour la défense du Travail national was formed to oppose the lowering of tariffs. The council included Antoine Odier (President), Auguste Mimerel (Vice-President), Joseph Périer (Treasurer) and Louis-Martin Lebeuf (Secretary). Members included Henri Barbet, Léon Talabot and Eugène Schneider.

Odier was made a Peer of France on 3 October 1837. He was awarded the cross of the Legion of Honour in 1846. He sat with the government supporters until the French Revolution of 1848. He disagreed with the policies of Napoleon III, and after the coup d'état of 2 December 1851 he refused to become a member of the Consultative Commission. Antoine Odier died on 19 August 1853 in Paris.

== Publications ==
- A. Odier; J. Lefebvre; Ganneron; et al. (1836), Enquête sur les fils de laine longue peignée, tordus en cordonnet et grillés, Paris : Imprimerie royale: Ministère des travaux publics, de l'agriculture et du commerce, Conseil supérieur du commerce
- Odier; Gautier; Joseph Périer; et al. (1838), Enquête sur les fils et tissus de lin et de chanvre, Paris : Imprimerie Royale: Ministère des Travaux Publics, de l'Agriculture et du Commerce, Conseil supérieur du commerce

== See also ==
- Bank Lombard Odier & Co

== Sources ==
- Antoine Odier (in French), Assemblée nationale
- Gille, Bertrand (1968), La Sidérurgie française au XIXe siècle: Recherches histioriques (in French), Librairie Droz, ISBN 978-2-600-04046-4
- Haag, Emile (1858), La France protestante, rue St Dominique d' enfer
- Plessis, Alain (1985), Régents et gouverneurs de la Banque de France sous le Second Empire (in French), Librairie Droz, ISBN 978-2-600-03986-4
- Robert, Adolphe; Cougny, Gaston (1891), "Odier, Antoine", Dictionnaire des parlementaires français de 1789 à 1889 (in French), vol. IV. Lav-Pla
- Stoskopf, Nicolas (2000), "Qu'est-ce que la haute banque parisienne au XIXe si'ecle ?", Journée d'Études Sur l'Histoire de la Haute Banque (in French)
- The Foreign Quarterly Review, Treuttel, 1847
