= Jacques Hamel =

French Catholic priest (1930–2016)

Servant of God Jacques Hamel
- Church: Saint-Étienne-du-Rouvray
- Archdiocese: Rouen

Orders
- Ordination: 30 June 1958 by Joseph-Marie Martin

Personal details
- Born: 30 November 1930 Darnétal, Seine-Maritime, France
- Died: 26 July 2016 (aged 85) Saint-Étienne-du-Rouvray, France
- Buried: Basilique Notre-Dame de Bonsecours; 49.4215304°N 1.1229655°E
- Denomination: Catholic Church

Jacques Hamel (French pronunciation: [ʒak amɛl]; 30 November 1930 – 26 July 2016) was a French Catholic priest who served in Saint-Étienne-du-Rouvray. On 26 July 2016, Hamel was murdered during the 2016 Normandy church attack by two Muslim men pledging allegiance to the Islamic State of Iraq and the Levant while Hamel celebrated Mass in his church.

The circumstances of his death have led him to be called a martyr by Christians, including Pope Francis, non-Christians, and the press. Calls to declare him a saint started soon after his death. The beatification cause was officially opened at the diocesan level in April 2017, after Pope Francis had waived the otherwise mandatory five-year waiting period for the opening of such causes.

== Early life ==
Hamel was born on 30 November 1930 in Darnétal, France. At the age of six he became a choirboy in St. Paul's Church in Rouen and at 14 he entered the minor seminary. He served in the military for 18 months in Algeria. He did not wish to be an officer as he did not want to issue orders to other men to kill.

== Ministry ==
Hamel was ordained as a priest on 30 June 1958. He served as an assistant priest at the St. Antoine church in Le Petit-Quevilly from 1958, an assistant priest at the Notre-Dame de Lourdes church in Sotteville-lès-Rouen from 1967, a parish priest in Saint-Pierre-lès-Elbeuf from 1975, and a parish priest in Cléon from 1988. He joined the church in Saint-Étienne-du-Rouvray in 2000. He officially retired in 2005 at the age of 75, but continued serving as the parish's assistant priest.

With local imam Mohammed Karabila, the president of Normandy's regional council of Muslims, Hamel worked since early 2015 on an interfaith committee. After Hamel's death, Karabila described him as his friend with whom he had discussed religion and also as someone who gave his life for others.

== Death and legacy ==
Hamel died when his throat was slit by two Muslim men, Adel Kermiche and Abdel Malik Petitjean, both aged nineteen, who both pledged allegiance to the Islamic State. The attack occurred while Hamel was saying Mass in his parish in Saint-Étienne-du-Rouvray on 26 July 2016. Hamel was taken hostage along with three nuns and two parishioners and said "Satan, go!" during the struggle.

=== Commemorations and funeral ===
A Mass was held in his memory at Notre Dame de Paris on 27 July 2016. It was celebrated by the archbishop of Paris, André Vingt-Trois, and attended by president François Hollande, prime minister Manuel Valls and ministers Jean-Marc Ayrault, Bernard Cazeneuve, Emmanuel Macron and Najat Vallaud-Belkacem, as well as former presidents Nicolas Sarkozy and Valéry Giscard d'Estaing, the Archbishop of Rouen, Dominique Lebrun, and the Apostolic Nuncio to France, Luigi Ventura.

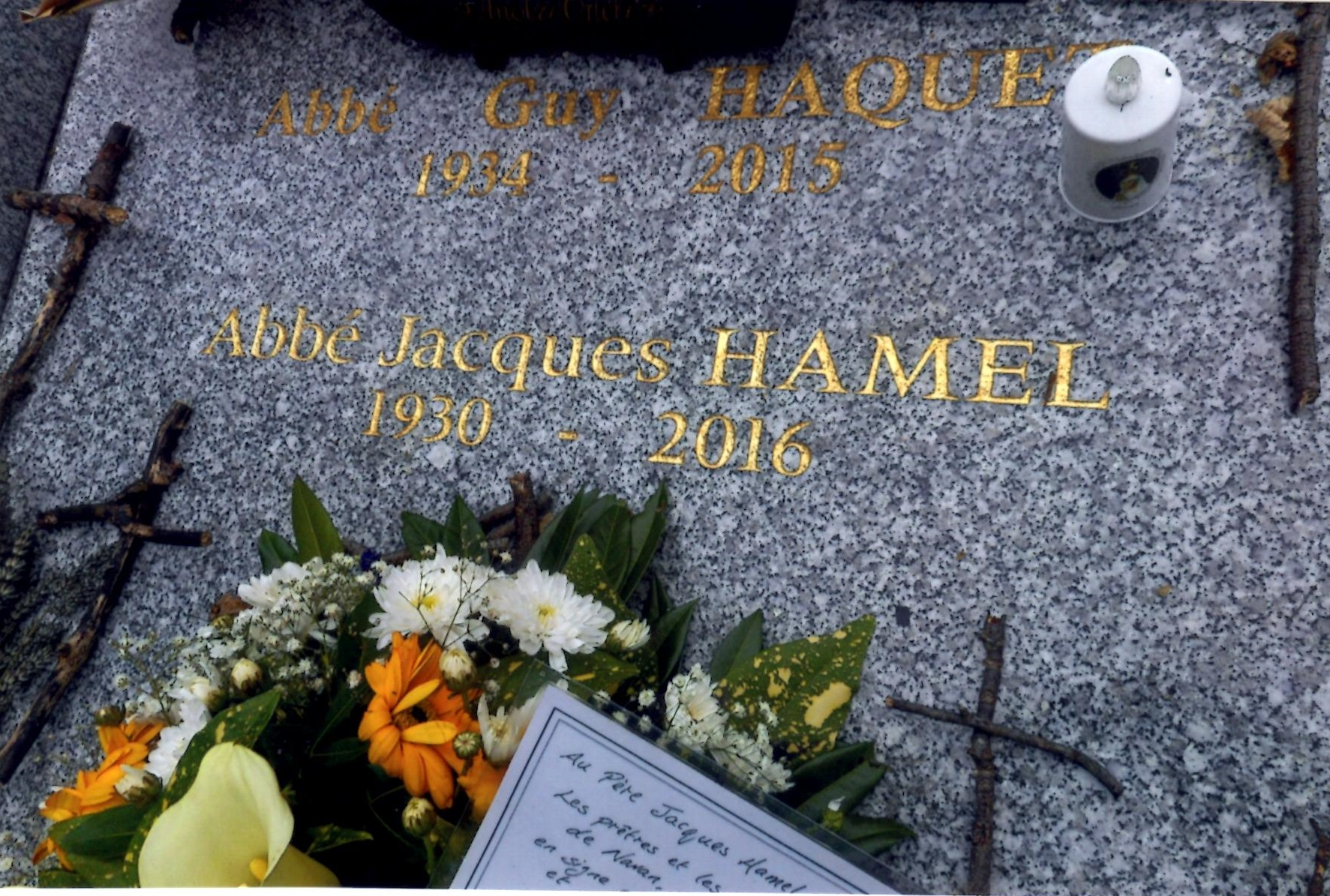
Hamel's grave at Basilique Notre-Dame de Bonsecours cemetery

The Funeral Mass was held at Rouen Cathedral on 2 August 2016, drawing a crowd of thousands which included senior clerics, the French interior minister Bernard Cazeneuve and former prime minister Laurent Fabius. Pope Francis instructed Lebrun to place images of Hamel in all the local churches.

In August 2016, the Italian arm of Aid to the Church in Need announced it would cover the cost of training 1,000 new priests in countries like Nigeria, Cuba, Zambia, the Democratic Republic of Congo and India in response to Hamel's murder. His legacy was also celebrated by French singer-songwriter Vianney Bureau in his song "L'homme et l'âme" which was dedicated to Père Hamel as well as victims of terror attacks throughout France.

=== Canonization cause ===
On the same day of the murder, public figures like the President of Lombardy, Roberto Maroni, called on Pope Francis to "immediately proclaim him St Jacques". The hashtag #santosubito ("saint now") trended on Twitter.

Hamel was called a martyr by some international press shortly after his death. On 13 August, La Croix reported that archbishop Dominique Lebrun of Rouen said he thought Hamel was a martyr, but the decision to declare him so was the pope's. He added that "formally, it is the bishop of the person's place of death to initiate the procedure." Anthony Fisher, the archbishop of Sydney, suggested he died in odium fidei ("in hatred of the faith"), adding, "This is a term Catholics use to describe the characteristic death of a martyr, as one who dies for his or her faith, and because of that faith."

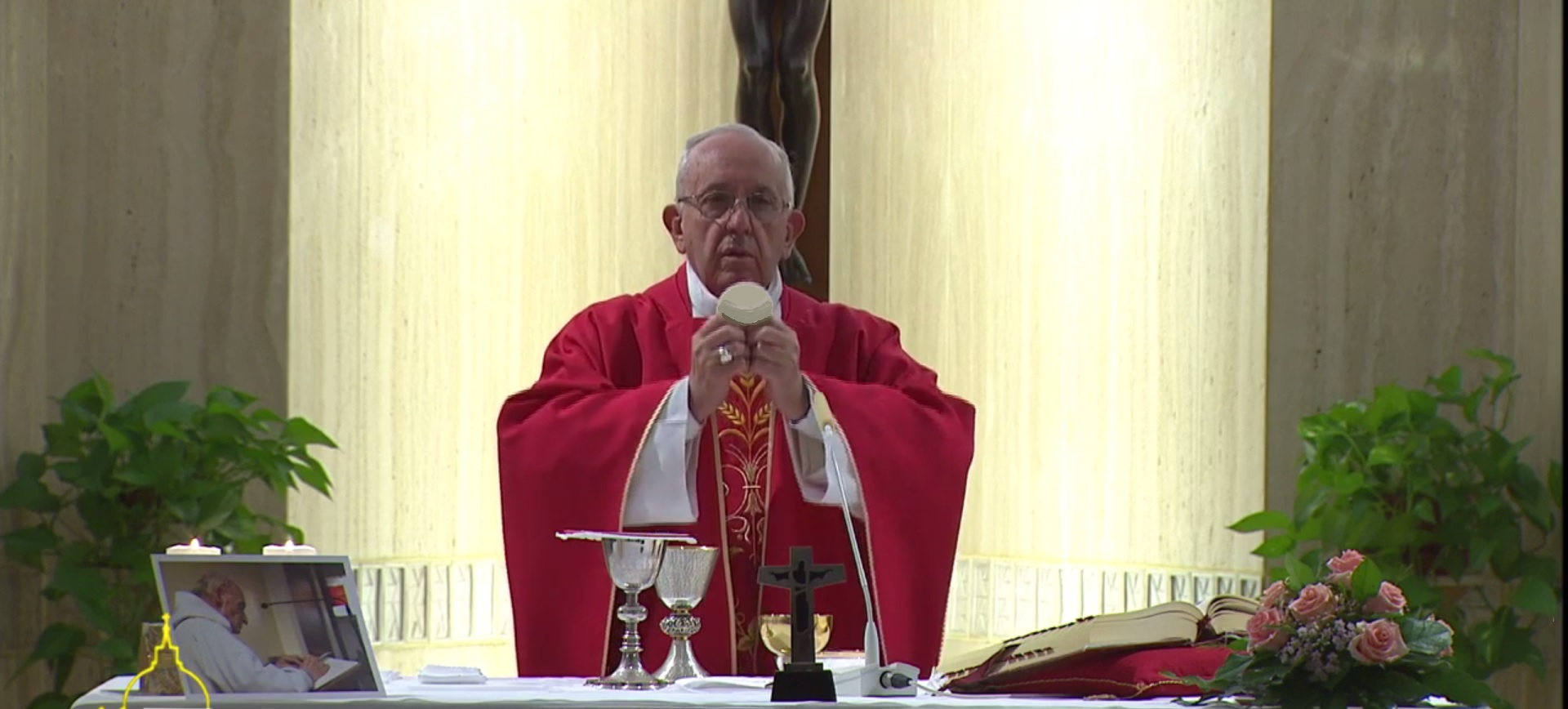
Pope Francis celebrates a special Mass for Hamel on 14 September 2016

On 14 September 2016, Pope Francis referred to Hamel as "blessed", a title used prior to canonization. "This man accepted his martyrdom next to the martyrdom of Christ, on the altar," Pope Francis said on 14 September during a homily at a Mass held for Hamel's soul at the Vatican. "He is a martyr and martyrs are beatified," the pope continued.. Two weeks later Archbishop Lebrun announced in a homily that the Pope had formally waived the customary five-year waiting period before the start of a beatification process, and that he had decided to prepare it without delay.

During Chrism Mass (on Holy Thursday, 13 April 2017), Archbishop Lebrun publicly announced the opening of the beatification cause, with all of Rouen's clergy gathered. Archbishop Lebrun also said the Pope himself allowed a photo of Hamel to be put in a church, and called him blessed. Paul Vigouroux, vice-chancellor of the diocese of Rouen, has been appointed postulator of the Cause, in charge of the local investigation. The Archdiocese of Rouen distributed a prayer to request Hamel's intercession. The prayer makes reference to the circumstances of his murder, including his unmasking of Satan, the divisor and his death in the habits of prayer.

Archbishop Lebrun announced on 1 February 2019 that the diocesan inquiry for the beatification process would be solemnly closed on 9 March 2019.

== See also ==
- List of terrorist incidents in July 2016
- Paulos Faraj Rahho
- Frans van der Lugt
- Andrea Santoro
- Luigi Padovese
