= Henri Barbet =

French industrialist and politician

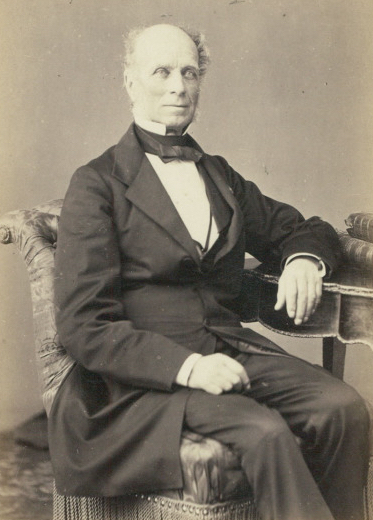
- Photograph by Franck

Deputy for Seine-Inférieure
- In office 5 July 1831 – 12 June 1842

Deputy for Seine-Inférieure
- In office 25 June 1844 – 6 July 1846
- Preceded by: Jacques Laffitte

Deputy for Seine-Inférieure
- In office 31 May 1863 – 27 April 1869

Personal details
- Born: 23 June 1789 Déville-lès-Rouen
- Died: 17 March 1875 (aged 85) Château de Valmont
- Occupation: Industrialist, politician

Henri Barbet (23 June 1789 – 17 March 1875), or Henry Barbet, was a French industrialist and politician. He owned and ran the family cotton spinning and weaving factory in Rouen, one of the most important in the region. For many years he was mayor of Rouen. He was responsible for building two bridges over the Seine, and for a policy of putting the indigent and insane to work in charitable workshops. He was a deputy for the Seine during the July Monarchy and again during the Second French Empire.

== Family ==
Henri Barbet was born on 23 June 1789 in Déville-lès-Rouen, Seine-Inférieure. He was from a Protestant family from the canton of Bolbec. His parents were Jacques Juste Barbet (1756–1813), merchant, and Marie Marguerite Gosgibus (1749–1834). He had an older brother, Juste Barbet de Jouy (1785–1866) and a younger brother Louis Auguste Barbet (1791–1872). In 1810 he married Marguerite Angran (1789–1858). They had two sons, Zoé Barbet (1810–72) and Henri Barbet (1816–1904), and two daughters, Aglaure Barbet (1814–89) and Thérèse Barbet (1824–99).

== Business career ==
The Barbets owned a factory in Rouen that spun Indian cotton and wove "indienne" cloth. It was one of the most important in the Seine-Inférieure, a center of cloth manufacture, and was awarded silver medals in 1819, 1823 and 1827. After their oldest brother left Rouen, Henri and his brother Auguste managed the Rouen factories under the name of "Barbet Frères". Later the "Barbet Frères" partnership was dissolved and Henri became sole owner of the family factory, which he expanded considerably. He and his brother-in-law Prosper Angran formed the company "Henry Barbet & Cie". He became a great industrialist. He was a member of the Rouen Commercial Court and the Chairman of the Board of the Bank of Rouen. He entered the Rouen Chamber of Commerce in 1828, and was president until 1872. In 1831 and 1833 King Louis Philippe visited the Frères Barbet factories in Déville-lès-Rouen. Later Napoleon III would visit the factories.

In 1842 Barbet acquired the large estate of Valmont in the valley of Fécamp, including parts of the communes of Mont-Saint-Aignan, Canteleu, Maromme, Notre-Dame-de-Bondeville and Sologne. He converted to Catholicism, and he and his wife donated two stained glass windows to the Basilique Notre-Dame de Bonsecours. The Association pour la défense du Travail national was formed to oppose the lowering of tariffs. In 1845 it was joined by the committee of metallurgists. The council included Antoine Odier (President), Auguste Mimerel (Vice-President), Joseph Périer (Treasurer) and Louis-Martin Lebeuf (Secretary). Members included Henri Barbet, Léon Talabot and Eugène Schneider. Barbet became an administrator of the Chemins de Fer du Nord. In 1858 Barbet handed over management of his factory to his son.

== Local politics ==
Henri Barbet was a militant Orléanist during the July Revolution of 1830. During the July Monarchy (1830–48) Barbet was made a member of the General Council of the Seine Inférieure in 1830. He was mayor of Rouen from 1830 to 1847. He was made a knight of the Legion of Honour in 1831. In 1836 he was elected president of the General Council. He was made a commander of the Legion of Honour in 1844.

As mayor of Rouen Barbet was responsible for opening the Pont d'Orléans (now the Corneille bridge), which connects the two banks of the Seine. This had been discussed since the 16th century. He was also responsible for the Boïeldieu suspension bridge. Barbet's social policy, called by some contemporaries the "Barbet System", was to make the poor do useful work. His main target was the "lazy" or "bad" poor, who made begging their main way of life, but he also thought that the insane could do useful work. He promoted eliminating indigence in Rouen by creating charitable workshops. In 1844 he was made chairman of the supervisory board of the Saint-Yon Asylum for the Insane of Rouen.

== National politics ==
Barbet was elected a Deputy for 1st constituency (Rouen) of Seine-Inférieure on 5 July 1831 for the government majority. In the first session he voted against heredity of the peerage. He was reelected on 21 July 1834, 4 November 1837 and 2 March 1839, holding office until 12 June 1842. He was not reelected in 1842. On 25 June 1844 he was reelected in a by-election, replacing Jacques Laffitte, who had died. He was again elected Deputy for Seine-Inférieure for the government majority on 25 June 1844, holding office until 6 July 1846. He was created a peer of France on 21 July 1846.

During the Second French Empire Henri Barbet was elected to the Corps législatif for the dynastic majority group, holding office from 31 May 1863 to 27 April 1869. He represented the 5th constituency of the Seine Inférieure. He was made a Grand Officer of the Legion of Honour on 30 August 1865. He lost the election of 24 May 1869 to the opposition candidate, Augustin François Buisson (1812–76). Barbet was on the list of Senators to be promulgated in August 1870, when the Franco-Prussian War intervened.. He retired from politics under the French Third Republic. Henri Barbet died on 17 March 1875 in Valmont, Seine-Maritime.

== Publications ==
- Henry Barbet (1841), Suppression de la mendicité à Rouen. Lettre ... à M. Chapuis Montlaville, Paris: impr. de P. Baudouin
- Henry Barbet (1855), Exposition Universelle de 1855. Extrait des rapports de jury de la XXVIe classe. Gravure des cylindres pour impression sur étoffes, Paris: Impr. Impériale / Exposition internationale
- Henry Barbet (1856), Calligraphie, gravure, cartes à jouer, reliure et registres (Gravure des cylindres pour impression sur étoffes), Paris: Impr. impériale
- Henry Barbet (1865), Inauguration à Rouen de la statue équestre de Napoléon Ier, 15 août 1865, Rouen: impr. de Ch.-F. Lapierre et Cie

== Sources ==
- Anceau, E. (1999), "Henry Barbet", Dictionnaire des Députés du Second Empire (in French), P.U.R.
- Bezon, Jean; Lorrain, A. (1863), Dictionnaire général des tissus anciens et modernes: ouvrage où sont indiquées et classées toutes les espèces de tissus connues jusqu'à ce jour soit en France, soit à l'étranger, notamment dans l'Inde, la Chine, etc., etc., avec l'explication abrégée des moyens de fabrication et l'entente des matières, nature et apprêt, applicables à chaque tissu en particulier (in French), T. Lépagnez
- Boueu (22 August 1872), Barbet, Henry (in French), Grande Chancellerie de la Légion d'Honneur – via Leonore
- Carbonel, Frédéric (2007), "Décentralisation, "Système Barbet" et protection sociale des aliénés en Seine-Inférieure. Débats autour de la loi de 1838 sous la Monarchie de Juillet" (PDF), Mémoires de la protection sociale en Normandie (in French) (6)
- Gille, Bertrand (1968), La Sidérurgie française au XIXe siècle: Recherches histioriques (in French), Librairie Droz, ISBN 978-2-600-04046-4
- Guéroult, Guillaume, "Henry Barbet", Geneanet (in French)
- Henri Barbet (in French), Assemblée nationale
- Pierfit, "Henri BARBET", Geneanet (in French)
- Robert, Adolphe; Cougny, Gaston (1889), "Henri Barbet", Dictionnaire des parlementaires français de 1789 à 1889 (in French)
- The Foreign Quarterly Review, Treuttel, 1847
