= Jacques Laffitte =

French banker and politician (1767–1844)

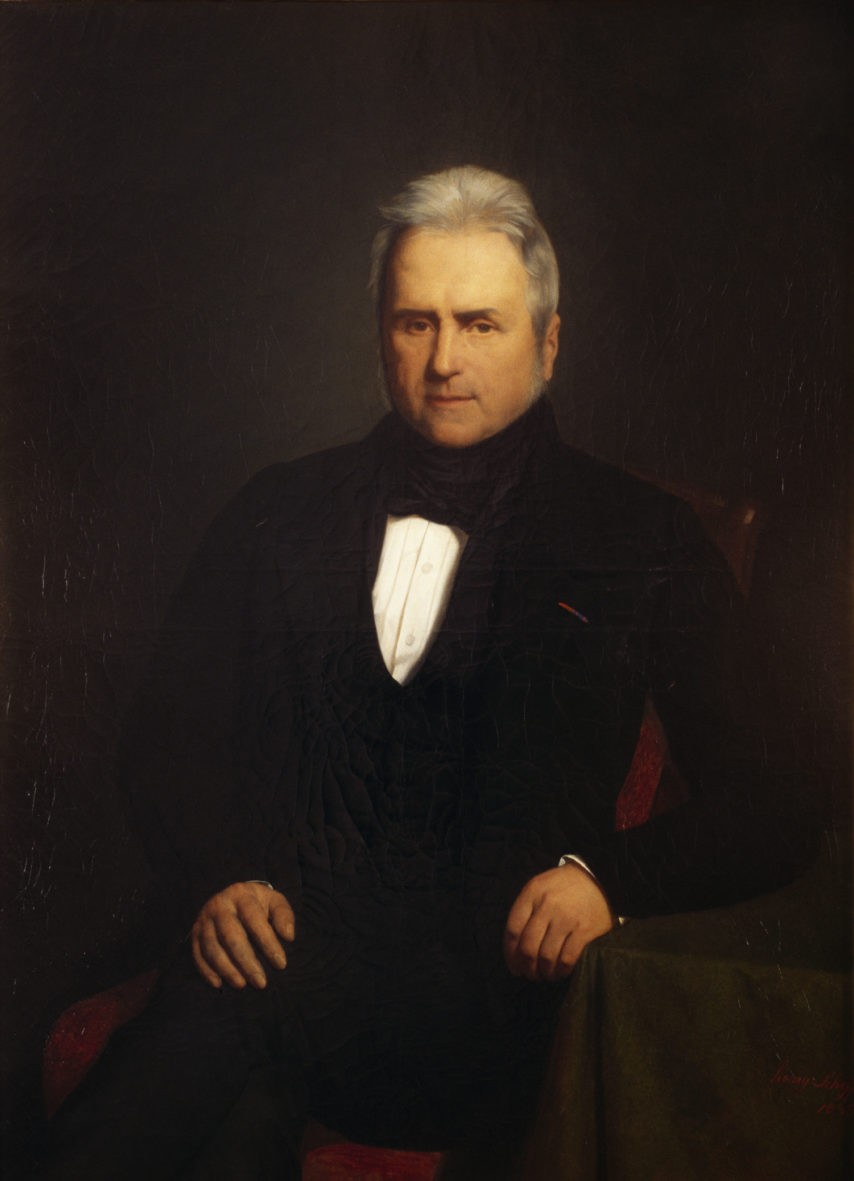

Member of the Chamber of Deputies for Seine-Inférieure
- In office 2 March 1839 – 26 May 1844
- Preceded by: Jean-François Izarn
- Succeeded by: Henry Barbet
- Constituency: Rouen
- In office 21 June 1834 – 8 February 1838
- Preceded by: Jacques Asselin de Villequier
- Succeeded by: Jean-François Izarn
- Constituency: Rouen

Prime Minister of France
- In office 2 November 1830 – 13 March 1831
- Monarch: Louis Philippe I
- Preceded by: Louis Philippe I
- Succeeded by: Casimir Périer

President of the Chamber of Deputies
- In office 21 August 1830 – 11 November 1830
- Monarch: Louis Philippe I
- Preceded by: Casimir Périer
- Succeeded by: Casimir Périer

Member of the Chamber of Deputies for Basses-Pyrénées
- In office 29 March 1827 – 21 June 1834
- Preceded by: Jean de Nays Candau
- Succeeded by: Jean Isidore Harispe
- Constituency: Bayonne

Member of the Chamber of Deputies for Seine
- In office 8 February 1838 – 2 March 1839
- Preceded by: Antoine Odier
- Succeeded by: Emmanuel de Las Cases
- Constituency: Paris (6th arrondissement)
- In office 8 May 1815 – 25 February 1824
- Preceded by: Gaspard Louis Caze de La Bove
- Succeeded by: Jacques-Charles Dupont de l'Eure
- Constituency: Paris (2nd arrondissement)

Governor of the Bank of France
- In office 6 April 1814 – 1820
- Preceded by: François Jaubert
- Succeeded by: Martin-Michel-Charles Gaudin

Personal details
- Born: 24 October 1767 Bayonne, Labourd, France
- Died: 26 May 1844 (aged 76) Paris, France
- Resting place: Père Lachaise Cemetery
- Party: Doctrinaires (1815–1830); Movement Party (1830–1844)
- Profession: Businessman, banker

Jacques Laffitte (French pronunciation: [ʒak lafit]; 24 October 1767 – 26 May 1844) was a leading French banker, governor of the Bank of France (1814–1820) and liberal member of the Chamber of Deputies during the Bourbon Restoration and July Monarchy. He was an important figure in the development of new banking techniques during the early stages of industrialization in France. In politics, he played a decisive role during the Revolution of 1830 that brought Louis-Philippe, the duc d'Orléans, to the throne, replacing the unpopular Bourbon king Charles X.

Laffitte was named president of the new Citizen King's Council of Ministers and Minister of Finance (2 November 1830 – 13 March 1831). After a brief ministry of 131 days, his "Party of Movement" gave way before the "Party of Order" led by the banker Casimir-Pierre Périer. Laffitte left office discredited politically and financially ruined. He rebounded financially in 1836 with his creation of the Caisse Générale du Commerce et de l'Industrie, a forerunner of French investment banks of the second half of the 19th century such as the Crédit Mobilier (1852). The Caisse Générale did not survive the financial crisis caused by the Revolution of 1848.

== Biography ==
=== Early life ===
Laffitte was born in 1767 at Bayonne in the French Basque Country, one of four sons and six daughters of Pierre Laffitte, a master carpenter. He apprenticed with his father for a time, but also found clerking positions with a local notary and merchant. In 1788, at 21 years of age and on the eve of the Revolution in France, he arrived in Paris at the offices of the prominent Swiss banker Jean-Frédéric Perregaux (1744–1808), rue du Sentier, where he was hired as a bookkeeper. It was a starting position that offered Laffitte valuable learning experiences and great potential for advancement. Perregaux was a banker with a wealthy clientele, important foreign connections and friends in high places.

He was a shrewd, cosmopolitan businessman who prospered from the Revolution. He helped to bankroll Napoleon's rise to power and became a founder of the Bank of France in 1800 and president of its directing Council of Regents. Laffitte became Perregaux's right-hand man in the private bank and was promoted to a partnership in 1806. In 1807, because of Perregaux's declining health, he was named managing director and effective head of the bank. The bank's name was changed to "Perregaux, Laffitte and Company". Perregaux's son, Alphonse (1785–1841), and his sister, were silent partners (commanditaires). Virginie Monnier observes: "For the first time in the history of banks in France, a clerk took over his patron's position directly." When Perregaux died in 1808, Laffitte also took over his place as one of the fifteen regents of the Bank of France. He became president of the Chamber of Commerce of Paris (1810–1811) and was appointed as a judge of the Tribunal de commerce de la Seine (1813).

After the defeat of Napoleon in 1814, he was named provisional governor of the Bank of France by the incoming Bourbon king Louis XVIII. Napoleon, when on his way into final exile after Waterloo (15 June 1815), reportedly deposited 6 million francs in Laffitte's bank. When Napoleon's estate was being contested later in 1826, Laffitte calculated his bank's obligation at 3,856,121 francs, interest included.

=== Business career during the Restoration ===
During the Bourbon Restoration, "Jacques Laffitte and Company" was one of the wealthiest private banks in Paris and a leading firm among the select group of twenty or so banking houses known collectively as the Parisian Haute Banque. Besides Laffitte, the group included the banks of Casimir and Scipion Perier fr, Benjamin Delessert, Jean Hottinguer, Adolphe Mallet, François Cottier fr, Antoine Odier, Jacques Lefebvre fr and Michel Pillet-Will fr.

The capital resources of such early 19th century banks were limited, but they associated for underwriting major government loans and for financing promising private business ventures. Laffitte associated with Delessert, Hottinguer, James de Rothschild and others to compete in 1817–18 with the powerful foreign banks of Baring Brothers (London) and Hope & Company (Amsterdam) for underwriting shares in France's loans of liberation. Earlier, in 1816, he took the lead with Delessert in founding the Compagnie Royale d'Assurances Maritimes, a pioneer joint-stock insurance company with a capitalization of 10 million francs. Laffitte was president and Casimir and Scipion Perier were among the administrators of this capital mobilizing venture. In 1818, along with fellow banker and industrialist Benjamin Delessert, Laffitte was a key figure in the establishment of the first French savings bank, the Caisse d'Épargne et de Prévoyance de Paris. Practically all of the members of the board of regents of the Bank of France, where Laffitte was then governor, were listed as administrators of the new bank. Laffitte was reaching the peak of his good fortune by 1818. He was sufficiently wealthy by then to be able to purchase the 17th century Château de Maisons (Department of Yvelines), near Paris, designed by the famous architect François Mansart. Before the Revolution, the beautiful château was the property of Louis XVI's brother, the comte d'Artois, who would come to the throne in 1824 as Charles X. Possessing Maisons, and being able to entertain notables of French society there in the former royal château, was a personal triumph for Laffitte, the son of a Bayonne carpenter. It was "le rêve d'un parvenu" (the dream of a newly rich) at a time when family history, titles and property holdings mattered so much.

In 1821–1822, Laffitte was the moving spirit behind the formation of the Compagnie des Quatre Canaux, a joint-stock company that mobilized the capital assets of haute banque members to help finance a major canal construction program initiated by the government. Laffitte's consortium obtained one-half of the total value of the loans made to the government. The top four lenders for the Four Canals Company were Jacques Laffitte & Co. (11,736,000 francs), H. Hentsch, Blanc & Co. (11,736,000), Pillet-Will & Co. (10,976,000) and André & Cottier (7,870,000). Laffitte's bid for an even larger share in the loans had been rejected by the ultra-royalist ministry of Count Jean-Antoine Villèle. In 1825, Laffitte's ambitious financial planning was frustrated a second time when Villèle refused to authorize his proposed Société Commanditaire de l'Industrie, a private investment bank designed to provide bank credit for large-scale industrial development in France. The Commanditaire, with Laffitte as its president, was to be capitalized at 100 million francs. It had the backing of French industrialists, many haute banque members in Paris and leading banking houses in London, Geneva and Frankfurt. Casimir Perier and the famous woolens industrialist William Ternaux were to have been its two vice-presidents. "L'esprit d'association" (the spirit of association), which was a broad slogan of the time among liberals for promoting economic progress, would have been exemplified by the company. But the Commanditaire was ill-timed politically: Laffitte was then a leader of the liberal opposition to the government of Charles X. Also, the plan was seen as too ambitious, even audacious, by the conservative regents and government administrators of the influential Bank of France. Laffitte would need to wait and try again after the July Revolution of 1830.

=== Political career ===
Laffitte viewed the return of the Bourbons favorably at first. He provided financial assistance for the incoming Louis XVIII (1814–1824) and kept his position as governor of the Bank of France during 1814–1820. He was elected to the Chamber of Deputies in 1815 and continued as a deputy throughout the Restoration except for the years 1824–27. Like his fellow elected deputy and banker Casimir Pierre Périer, he took a liberal stance "on the left" and spoke out in the Chamber in support of constitutional monarchy, liberty of the press, freedom of enterprise, competence in state administration and transparency in government financial affairs. As the Bourbon regime became more and more conservative and royalist after 1820, Laffitte became increasingly dissatisfied and outspoken in opposition. With Casimir Perier, he led a spirited opposition in the Chamber in the 1820s against Comte Villèle's handling of the finances of the government's canal construction program. He lost favor in 1825 by voting for Villèle's plan for indemnifying notables for lands confiscated during the Revolution, but regained popular support in 1828 when his daughter, Albine Laffitte, was married to Napoleon-Joseph Ney, the son of the honored Maréchal Michel Ney, duc d'Elchingen, the prince de Moskowa. Things began to go wrong rapidly after Charles X became king in 1824. Fearful of growing liberal and even republican opposition to his government, the king finally acted disastrously in 1829 by installing the ultra-royalist ministry of Prince Jules de Polignac. When the ultra-royalists were defeated in the elections of 1830 the King issued his infamous ordinances of 25 July 1830, suspending freedom of the press, dissolving the Chamber of Deputies, and changing election laws in favor of the landed nobility. The upshot was the July Revolution of 1830.

Laffitte was one of the earliest and most determined advocates for ousting Charles X and his ministers and establishing a new government under Louis Philippe I, the duc d'Orléans, whose father, Philippe Égalité, had supported the Revolution of 1789. Laffitte's home in Paris became a headquarters for the "Party of Movement" to make Louis-Philippe the "Citizen King" of a reformed constitutional monarchy. Against the background of popular insurrection in Paris and growing unrest in the provinces, the plan succeeded. Charles X fled to England, his ministers were arrested, Louis-Philippe I assumed the throne and Laffitte became president of the Council of Ministers and Minister of Finances (2 November 1830 – 13 March 1831). As it proved, Laffitte was much better as a banker and financier than as a king maker or political leader. His government, torn between the necessity for preserving order in France and the need to conciliate the Parisian populace, succeeded in doing neither. To moderate liberals in the Chamber of Deputies like Casimir Perier, and even for the king himself, his dealings with popular revolutionary figures such as General Lafayette were moving France dangerously toward the establishment of a republic. Perier refused to have anything to do with Laffitte's ministry. After 131 days of turmoil and indecision, Laffitte was forced to resign and Perier's "Party of Order" formed a new ministry. Laffitte would keep his seat in the Chamber after 1831, but he would never lead or be part of another ministry.

Laffitte's foray into the complicated politics of 1830 in France cost him dearly financially. The revolution had worsened an already troubled French economy. Laffitte & Co. suffered losses of 13 million francs and the bank had to be liquidated (January 1831). To help cover his bank's losses, Laffitte talked the governor of the Bank of France into arranging an unprecedented bank loan of 7 million francs. He put his Paris home on the rue d'Artois (now the rue Laffitte) and his art collection up for sale. Most importantly, for 6 million francs, he sold off family woodlands at Breteuil to the king, Louis-Philippe, which helped greatly but hurt Laffitte politically and financially when the king made the sale public. Laffitte at least managed to protect the Château de Maisons from sale, but he divided up its extensive parklands into lots for building country villas to sell to rich Parisians. This actually became a remarkably creative early experiment in suburban real estate development, as described in a brochure prepared by M. de Rouvières entitled Histoire et description pittoresque de Maisons-Laffitte (1838). Laffitte and his brother, Jean-Baptiste Laffitte, established a stage coach line for the 15-kilometer trip from Paris to Maisons. His nephew, Charles Laffitte (1803–1875), and his son-in-law, the Prince de Moskowa, added a grassland horse racing track – the first in France.

=== Recovery ===
By 1836–37 Laffitte had his affairs sufficiently in order to revive his 1825 plan for the Commanditaire. He created (15 July 1837) the Caisse Générale du Commerce et de l'Industrie to help provide long-term credit for industrial enterprise. The commandite rather than the joint-stock form of association was employed. The venture was capitalized at 55 million francs. The Bank of France imposed some annoying restrictions (the term "Banque" could not be employed), but otherwise the venture's approval went forward successfully. Laffitte's principal associates were his brother, Martin Laffitte (1783–1840), and the sugar industrialist François Lebaudy (1799–1863). Was this company the prototype for the great joint-stock investment banks of the second half of the 19th century in France? Historians continue to research and ponder this question. Laffitte himself appears to have understood that the Caisse Générale did not fulfill his dream of a real "banque d'affaires." He wrote in his Mémoires: "If I was never able to create a great credit establishment like the one I would have wished, I at least built a great banking house that will be useful to Commerce and my family for a long time. That's a manly enough achievement for a 70-year old. Although others after me succeed in creating great credit establishments, for me there will remain the pride in having tried."

=== Final years and legacy ===
Undoubtedly, had he lived longer, Laffitte would have led the Caisse Générale enthusiastically into the risky business of financing railroad construction in France. Bonin has noted that by 1843 the company had already edged into the field with a 10 million franc loan for railroad construction by the Compagnie du Nord. Laffitte's nephew, Charles Laffitte, was involved with the investment. But Jacques Laffitte was seriously ill with pulmonary disease at the time. He died in Paris on 26 May 1844, at 77 years of age. The Caisse Générale was continued for a few years under the direction of the banker Alexandre Goüin (1792–1872), but failed to survive the Revolution of 1848 in France. Goüin wrote in his unpublished autobiography that, in his experience, the design failure of the company was that it could not cope adequately with both its long-term investments and its short-term commercial loans during times of financial crisis. The demise of the company during the economic crisis of 1847–48 in France was a case in point.

== See also ==
- The French Wikipedia has valuable articles for: fr:Jacques Laffitte, fr:Jean-Frédéric Perregaux, fr:Banque de France, fr:Caisse générale du commerce et de l'industrie.

== Family names ==
- Pierre Laffitte, brother (1765–1846)
- Martin Laffitte, brother (1773–1840)
- Jean-Baptiste Laffitte, brother (1775-?)
- Marine Laffitte, wife (1783–1849)
- Albine Laffitte, daughter (1803–1881)
- Charles Laffitte, nephew (1803–1875), son of Jean-Baptiste Laffitte

== Bibliography ==
- Baude, J.J. "Notice sur la Société Commanditaire de l'Industrie," Revue Encyclopédique, XXXIX (1828).
- Bayard, Eugène. La Caisse d'Épargne et de Prévoyance de Paris (Paris, 1900).
- Bergeron, Louis. Banquiers, négociants et manufacturiers parisiens du Directoire à l'Empire (Paris, 1978).
- Bertier de Sauvigny, Guillaume de. The Bourbon Restoration (Univ of Pennsylvania, 1966).
- Bonin, Hubert. "Jacques Laffitte banquier d'affaires sans créer de modèle de banque d'affaires," Bulletin de la Société des amis du château de Maisons, No.3 (2008).
- Bourset, Madeleine. Casimir Perier. Un Prince Financier au Temps du Romantisme (Paris, 1994).
- Brun, Maurice. Le banquier Laffitte, 1767–1844 (Abbeville, 1997).
- Cameron, Rondo. "France, 1800–1870," in Banking in the Early Stages of Industrialization, Chap. IV (New York, 1967).
- Gille, Bertrand. La banque et le crédit en France, 1815 à 1848 (Paris, 1959).
- Gille, Bertrand. La banque en France au XIXe siècle (Paris, 1970).
- Geiger, Reed G. Planning the French Canals (Newark, DE, 1994).
- Laffitte, Jacques. Mémoirs, 1767–1844 (Paris, 1932).
- Landes, David. "Vieille banque et banque nouvelle: Le révolution financière du dix-neuvième siècle," Revue d'histoire moderne et contemporaine, III (1956).
- Marec, Jacques. "Le banquier Jacques Laffitte, 1767–1844," Bulletin de la Société des amis du château de Maisons, No.3 (2008).
- Mathiez, Albert. "Le banquier Perregaux," Annales révolutionnaires, XII (March 1920).
- Monnier, Virginie. Jacques Laffitte. Roi des banquiers et banquier des rois (Bruxelles, 2013).
- Pinkney, David. The French Revolution of 1830 (Princeton, 1972).
- Ramon, Gabriel. Histoire de la Banque de France d'après les sources originales (Paris, 1929).
- Redlich, Fritz. "Jacques Laffitte and the Beginnings of Investment Banking in France," Bulletin of the Business Historical Society, Vol 22 (December 1948).
