= Louis-Martin Lebeuf =

French banker, faience manufacturer and politician

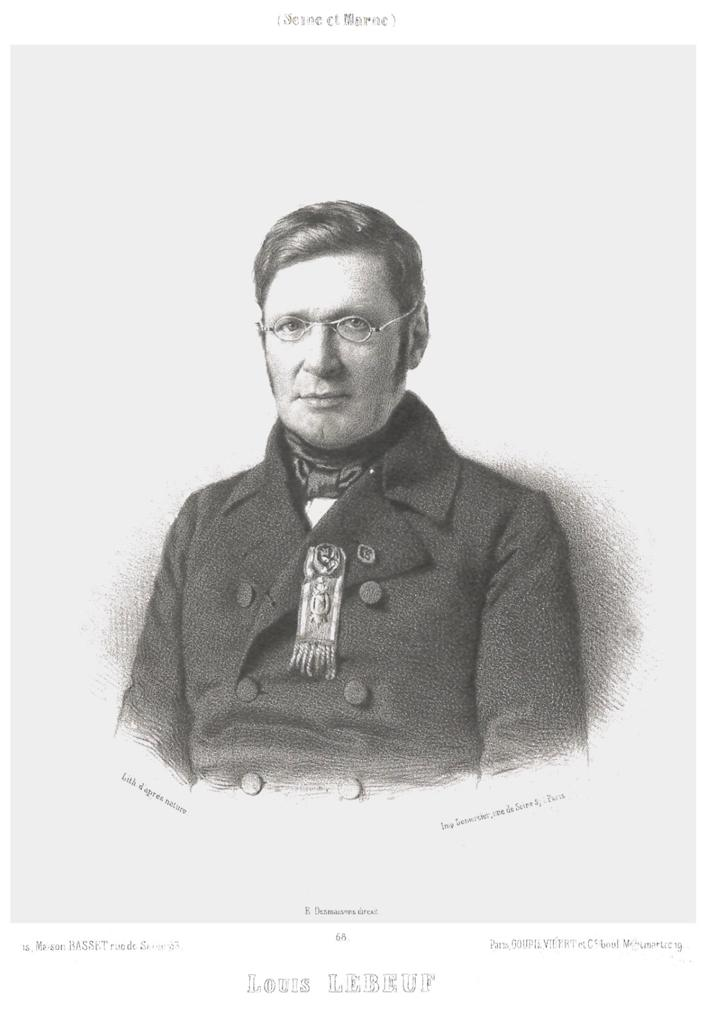
- Louis-Martin

Deputy
- In office 4 November 1837 – 12 June 1842

Member, National Legislative Assembly
- In office 13 May 1849 – 2 December 1851

Senator
- In office 26 January 1852 – 10 November 1854

Personal details
- Born: Lebeuf de Montgermont; 26 May 1792 L'Aigle, Orne, France
- Died: 10 November 1854 (aged 62) Pringy, Seine-et-Marne, France
- Occupation: Banker, manufacturer politician

Louis-Martin Lebeuf (26 May 1792 – 10 November 1854) was a French banker, faience manufacturer and right-leaning politician. He supported protectionist policies, and supported the coup d'etat that launched the Second French Empire under Napoleon III.

== Family ==
Louis-Martin Lebeuf was born on 26 May 1792 in L'Aigle, Orne. His parents were Martin Lebeuf, a notary in L'Aigle, and Félicité Hilliere. On 12 November 1822 in Paris he married Claudine Athénaïs Marie Pollissard (1804–1887), daughter of Adrien Edmé Pollissard, a Paris merchant, and Alexandrine Marie Denise Pajot. Their children were Adrien Louis Lebeuf (1824–1876), faience manufacturer, Alfred Louis Lebeuf (d. 1859), diplomat. and Alexandrine Louise Marie Lebeuf (1830–1865).

== Business career ==
Lebeuf's family had been notaries for over 200 years. Although he was meant to follow this career, he preferred commerce. He entered a banking house as a clerk, and by the age of 19 was one of the heads of the house. He was elected a judge of the Commercial Court and a member of the Paris Chamber of Commerce. Lebeuf was a member of the Bank of France Discount Board from 1830 to 1836. In 1835 he was appointed a regent of the Bank of France. He was a regent of the Bank of France from 28 January 1836 until his death. He was also head of the banking house Lebeuf et Cie.

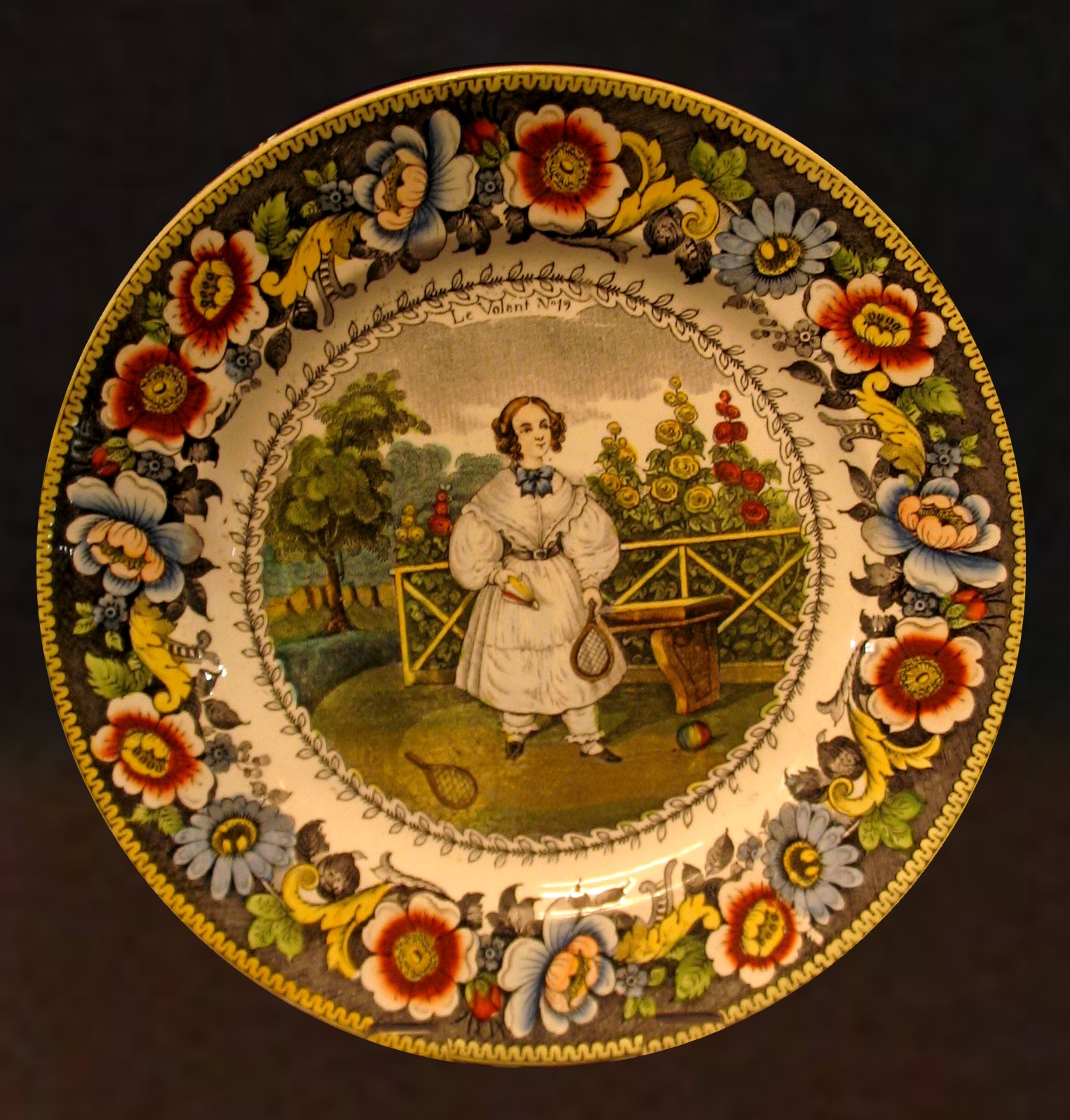
Faience plate with printed and painted decoration, Creil

Lebeuf was director of the Creil-Montereau faience works for the Société Lebeuf et Millet from 1840 until his death. The trademark was "LM et Cie". Lebeuf purchased the château and estate of Montgermont at Pringy, Seine-et-Marne, and was ennobled. The Association pour la défense du Travail national was formed to oppose the lowering of tariffs. The council included Antoine Odier (President), Auguste Mimerel (vice-president), Joseph Périer (Treasurer) and Louis-Martin Lebeuf (Secretary). Members included Henri Barbet, Léon Talabot and Eugène Schneider.

== Political career ==
During the July Monarchy Lebeuf was a member of the General Council of Seine-et-Marne. He was made an Officer of the Legion of Honour. Lebeuf was a member of the chamber of deputies from 4 November 1837 to 2 February 1839, representing the Seine-et-Marne department for the government majority. He was reelected for the same seat on the same platform from 2 March 1839 to 12 June 1842. He failed to be reelected on 9 July 1842, and failed again on 1 August 1846.

During the French Second Republic Lebeuf was a member of the National Legislative Assembly from 13 May 1849 to 2 December 1851, representing the Seine-et-Marne department. In the legislature he sat on the right with the anti-republican majority. He supported the French expedition to Rome led by Charles Oudinot. In 1851 he backed the coup-d'etat of Napoleon III. During the Second French Empire he was a senator from 26 January 1852 until 10 November 1854. Louis-Martin Lebeuf died on 10 November 1854 at the château de Montgermont in Pringy, Seine-et-Marne.

== Sources ==
- Gille, Bertrand (1968), La Sidérurgie française au XIXe siècle: Recherches histioriques (in French), Librairie Droz, ISBN 978-2-600-04046-4
- Lebeuf (in French), AABF: Association Artistique de la Banque de France
- "Louis, Martin Lebeuf", sycomore (in French), Assemblée nationale
- Robert, Adolphe; Cougny, Gaston (1891), "Louis, Martin Lebeuf", Dictionnaire des parlementaires français de 1789 à 1889 (in French), vol. IV. Lav-Pla
- The Foreign Quarterly Review, Treuttel, 1847
