= Basilique Notre-Dame de Bonsecours =

Basilica in Bonsecours, France

Basilique Notre Dame du Bon Secours Marie Auxiliatrice
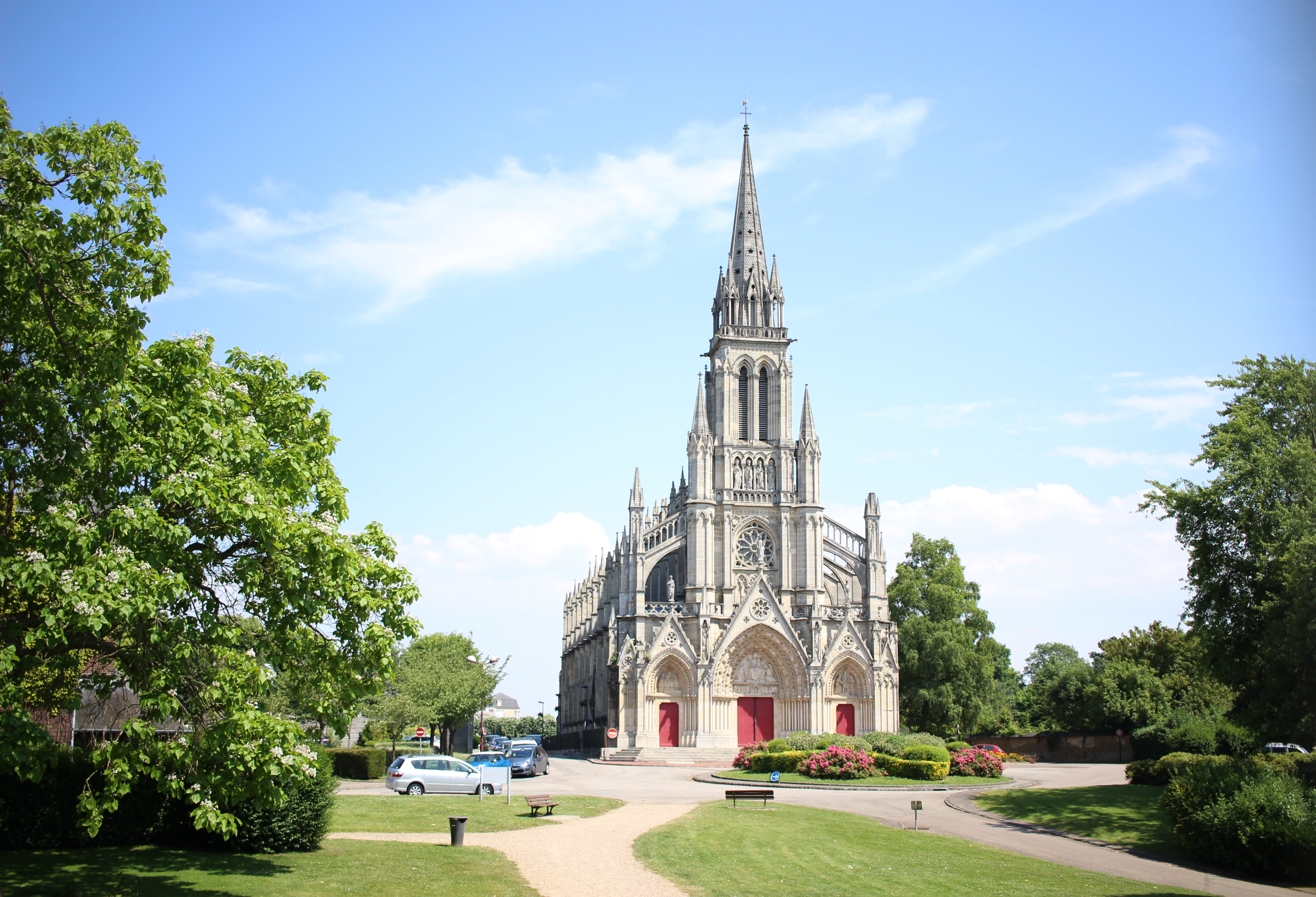
- Western facade, July 2016

- Location in France

Religion
- Affiliation: Roman Catholic
- Province: Seine Maritime
- Region: Normandy
- Governing body: Archdiocese of Rouen

Location
- Municipality: Bonsecours,
- Country: France
- Interactive map of Basilique Notre Dame du Bon Secours; Marie Auxiliatrice
- Coordinates: 49.421556°N 1.122793°E

Architecture
- Architect: Jacques-Eugène Barthélémy^{(fr)}
- Style: Gothic Revival
- Groundbreaking: 4 May 1840
- Completed: 1844
- Direction of façade: West
- Designated as NHL: Monument historique

Website
- www.notredamedebonsecours.fr

The Basilique Notre Dame du Bon Secours, Marie Auxiliatrice (English: The Basilica of Our Lady of Refuge of Mary, the Help of Christians) is a Roman Catholic minor basilica in Bonsecours near Rouen, Seine—Maritime, France. It is the first church in France to be built in the Gothic Revival style. The basilica is highly ornately decorated with windows, sculptures and other elements often carrying the name or coat of arms of a patronal donor.

The original shrine was dedicated to the Blessed Virgin Mary, Help of Christians dating back to the thirteenth century. It was reconstructed and enlarged in 1840.

== Design ==
The basilica's design and construction were carefully supervised by the Abbé Victor Godefroy (1799–1868), the Bonsecours parish priest, who chose the Gothic style and raised the funds. Godefroy and the donors may have been drawn to this style from the time of King Louis IX of France (1226—1270) because it represented a society they thought was organized on a Christian basis.

Godefroy had been a textile manufacturer before becoming an ordained Catholic priest, and had experience with other building projects. His fundraising efforts were helped by his close friendship with the future Archbishop of Rouen, Cardinal Gustave Maximilien Juste de Croÿ-Solre.

The architect Jacques-Eugène Barthélémy^{(fr)} may have had a background in engineering. He had worked on partial reconstructions, but this was the first new church he had built. It is not known who trained Barthélemy as an architect, but he had sketched churches around France, including Reims Cathedral. He did not obtain approval for his design from the government's Conseil des batiments civils, which rejected Gothic designs for other proposed churches at the time. He made his design before Eugène Viollet-le-Duc first published his Gothic architectural theories in 1844, and before the Corps des architectes diocésains was established in 1848. (Note: Soon after completing the basilica Barthélemy laid the foundations of four or five churches and ogival chapels in the Seine-Inferior department. In 1862 he was asked to build a new chapel of Notre-Dame de la Délivrande.)

== History ==
The Basilique Notre-Dame de Bonsecours is located in Bonsecours, to the southeast of the center of Rouen, on a site that commands a view over the Seine river. It was built between 1840 and 1844, the first Catholic parish church built in Gothic Revival style. The first stone was laid in a ceremony on 4 May 1840. The first mass was celebrated on 15 August 1842 by 20,000 worshippers from the 14 parishes of Rouen. The building was completed in 1844.

- Pope Pius IX — granted the decree of pontifical coronation to the venerated Marian image enshrined within on 15 July 1870. The Archbishop of Rouen, Cardinal Henri-Marie-Gaston Boisnormand de Bonnechose executed the rite of coronation on 24 May 1880.
- Pope Benedict XV — raised the church to the status of a minor basilica on 12 February 1919.

In 1977, the basilica was inscribed in the inventory of historical monuments. On 24 August 2004 it was classified as a monument historique.

== Style ==
Godefroy called the basilica's style "early Gothic with lancets, the purest period of the thirteenth century". Unlike medieval church buildings that were built over a period of many years, the basilica has a consistent style throughout. 13th century features include flying buttresses, paired lancet windows, pinnacles, the bell tower, a gallery of statues and rose windows in the facade. There are features drawn from the Sainte-Chapelle of Paris, built in the 1240s, which was being restored in the 1840s. The plan of the church is akin to parish churches in Rouen of the 15th and 16th centuries, with the addition of a sacristy at the east end. It has a nave and two wide aisles, but unlike 13th century churches it does not have a transept or an ambulatory.

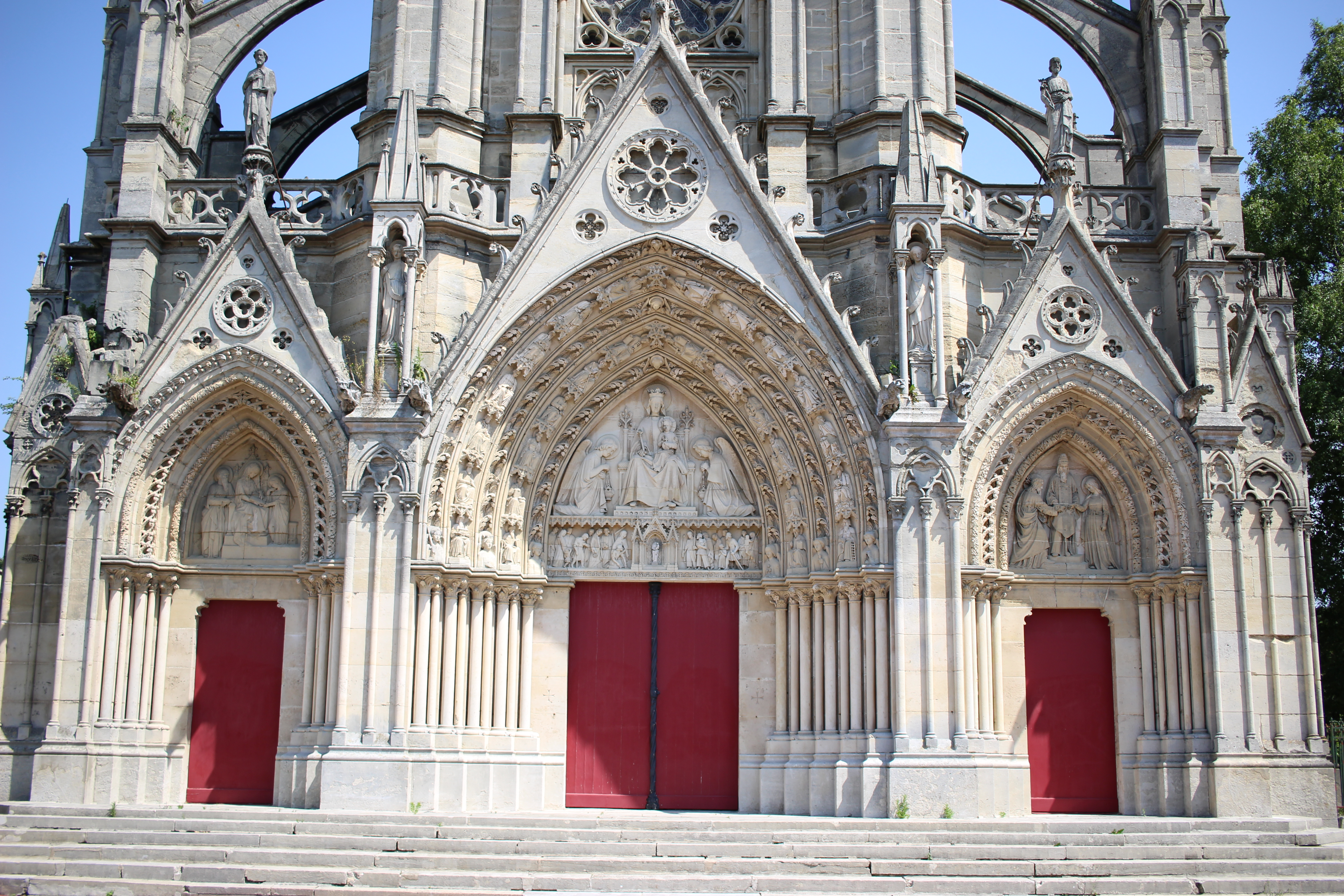
The three doors of the west facade

The Anti-Catholic Englishman John Ruskin heavily criticized its highly ornate design and described the church as:

Vile enough, indeed, in its general composition, but excessively rich in detail; many of the details are designed with taste, and all evidently by a man who has studied old work closely. But it is all as dead as leaves in December; there is not one tender touch, not one warm stroke on the whole facade. The men who did it hated it, and were thankful when it was done.

== Decoration and furnishings ==
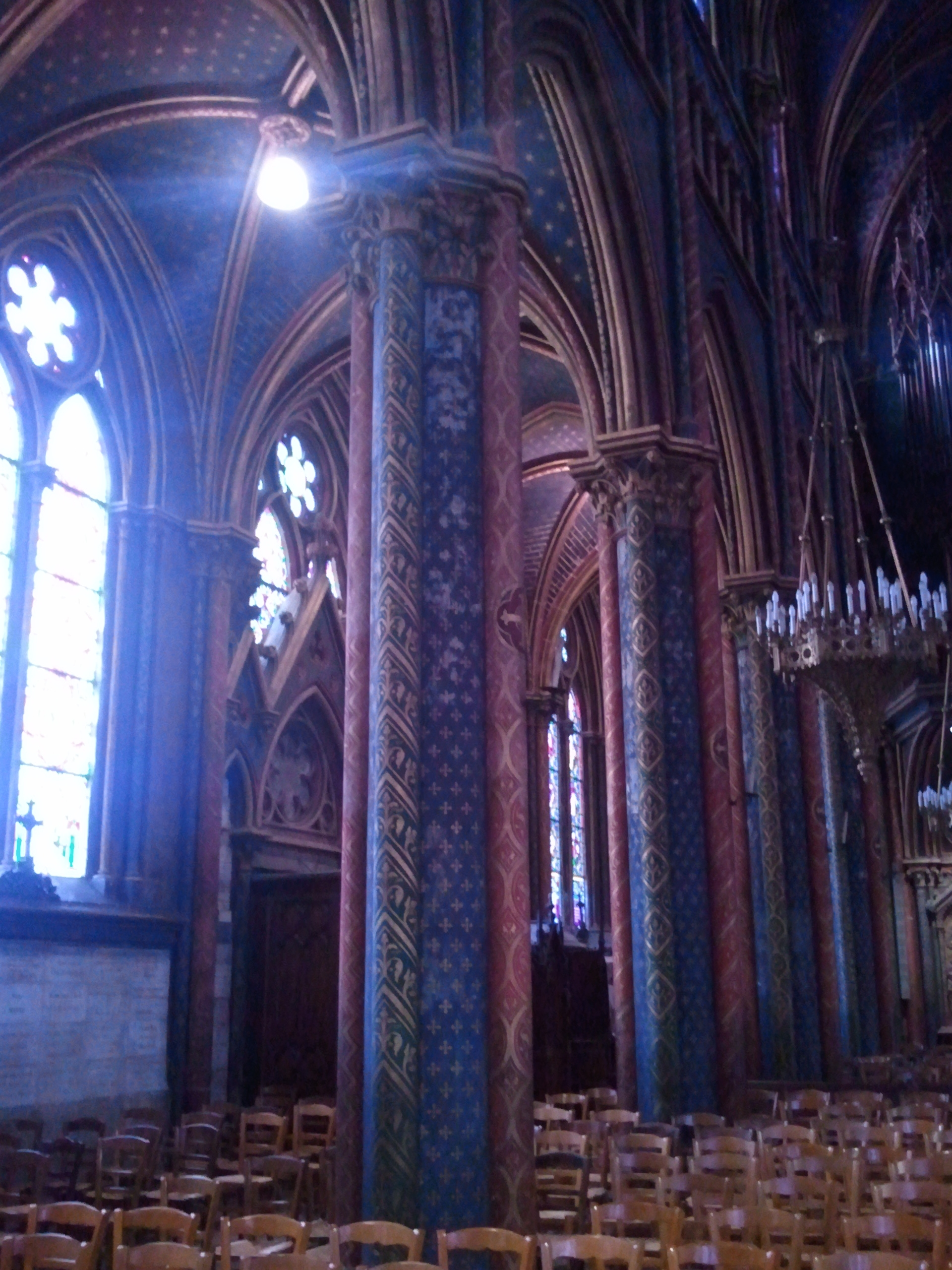
Detail of a painted column

The extensive and coordinated decorations were part of a revival of religious art under the July Monarchy and include murals, sculpture, stained glass windows and liturgical furnishings. All the interior surfaces of the basilica are painted, as with Sainte-Chapelle. There are three chapels, dedicated respectively to Mary, Saint Joseph, and Saints Theresa and Joan of Arc. The batismal font is set in a hexagonal marble structure created in Rouen in 1891. The main altar is gilded bronze, made from chiseled metal to a design by Barthélemy. A new altar was installed in the sanctuary in April 2006 made by Dominique Kaeppelin, sculptor at the Puy-en-Velay workshop. The stalls were made by the Maison Kreyenbielh of Paris and installed in 1858. There are four confessionals, made by Père Cahier. The well-known glass artist Henri Gerente installed five windows in the apse in 1842. Two of them are still in place.

Godefroy allowed the wealthy donors to pay for particular parts of the basilica, and to include their coat of arms and name or initials, either painted or engraved. Many of the windows include portraits of the donor. After Henri Barbet converted to Catholicism he and his wife donated two stained glass windows to the Basilique Notre-Dame de Bonsecours. Barbet was mayor of Rouen and a wealthy textile manufacturer. The front of the bell tower contains statues of the four evangelists. Above the gable over the central door there is a statue of the Virgin Mary donated by Elie-Anne de Montmorency-Luxembourg. Below this is a relief of Mary with the infant Jesus on her lap on the main tympanum flanked by two angels donated by Pascal Auguste Joseph Baudon de Mony, former Receiver-General.

In November 1857 Aristide Cavaillé-Coll delivered a new organ for the basilica, his first important work in Rouen. It was inaugurated by Louis James Alfred Lefébure-Wély, the organist of La Madeleine, Paris, on 20 November 1857. The buffet is neo-Gothic, in polychromatic oak, built to a design by father Arthur Martin. In 1888–89 Cavaillé-Coll made various major improvements to the instrument, which was inaugurated on 7 November 1889 by Charles-Marie Widor of the Church of Saint-Sulpice, Paris. Further enhancements were made in 1928 and 1954. The organ was classified as a monument historique in September 1997, and in 1999–2000 was largely restored to the 1889 version while retaining the 56-note keyboards and 30-note pedal.

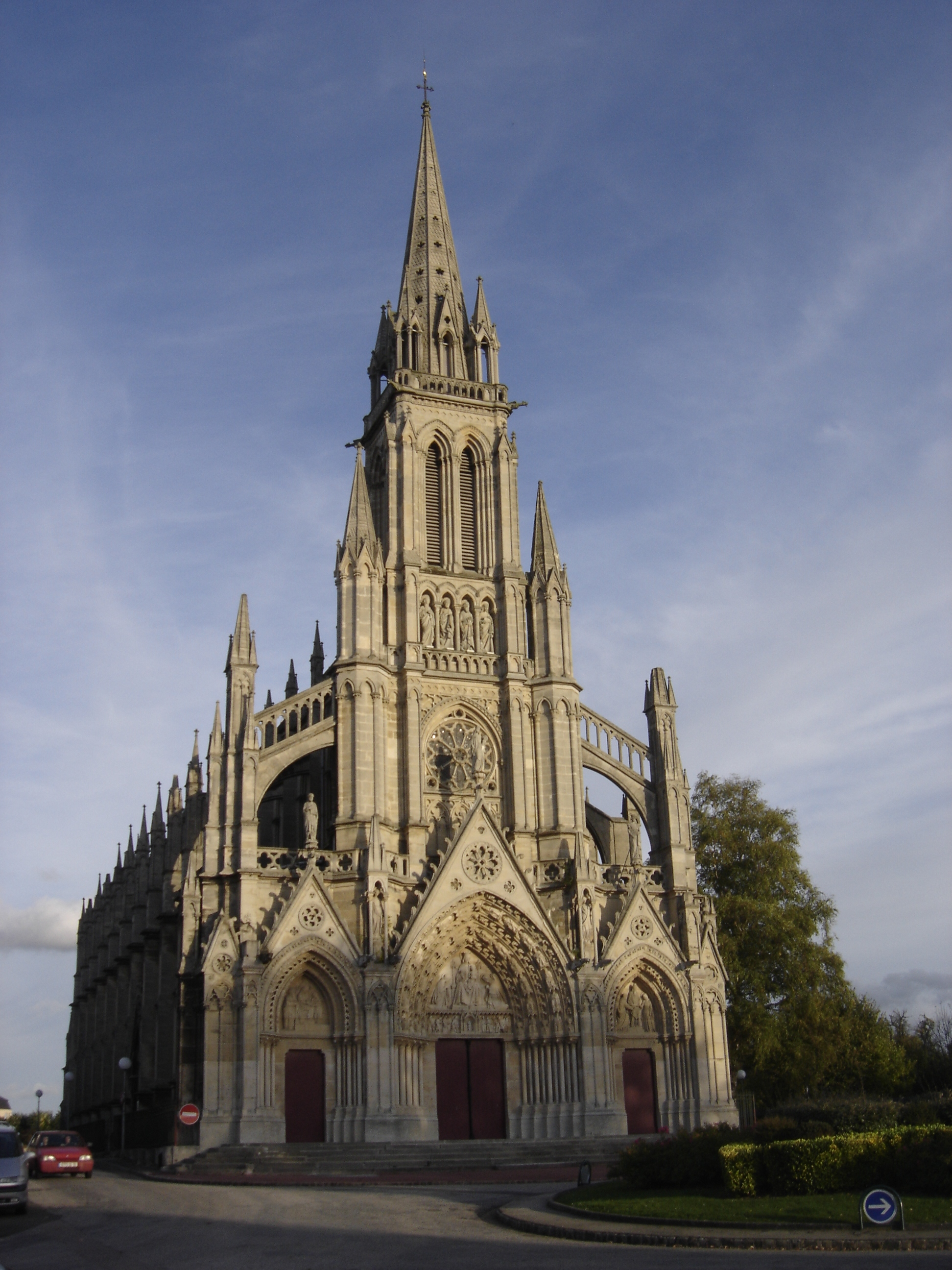
Front

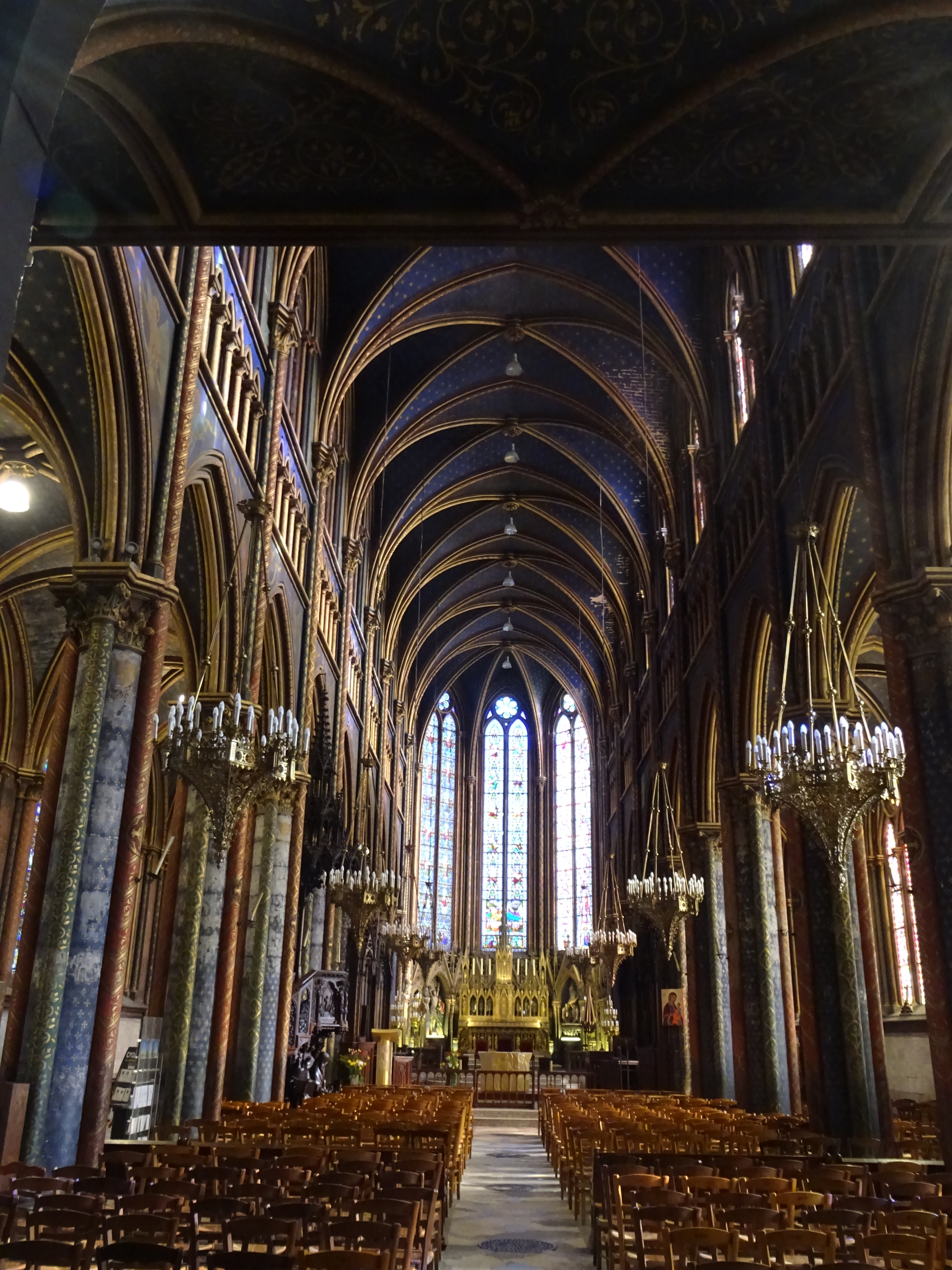
Interior

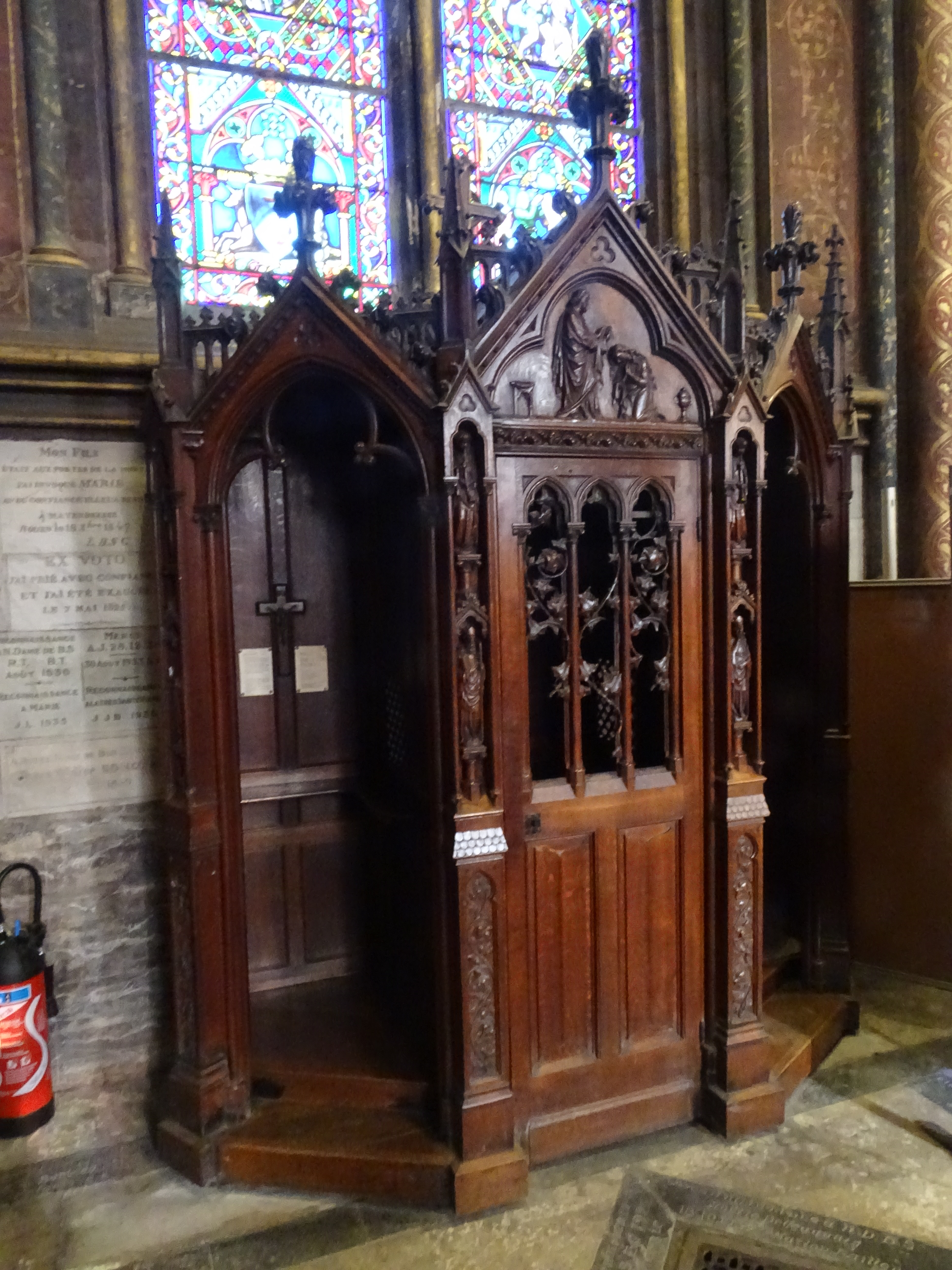
Confessional

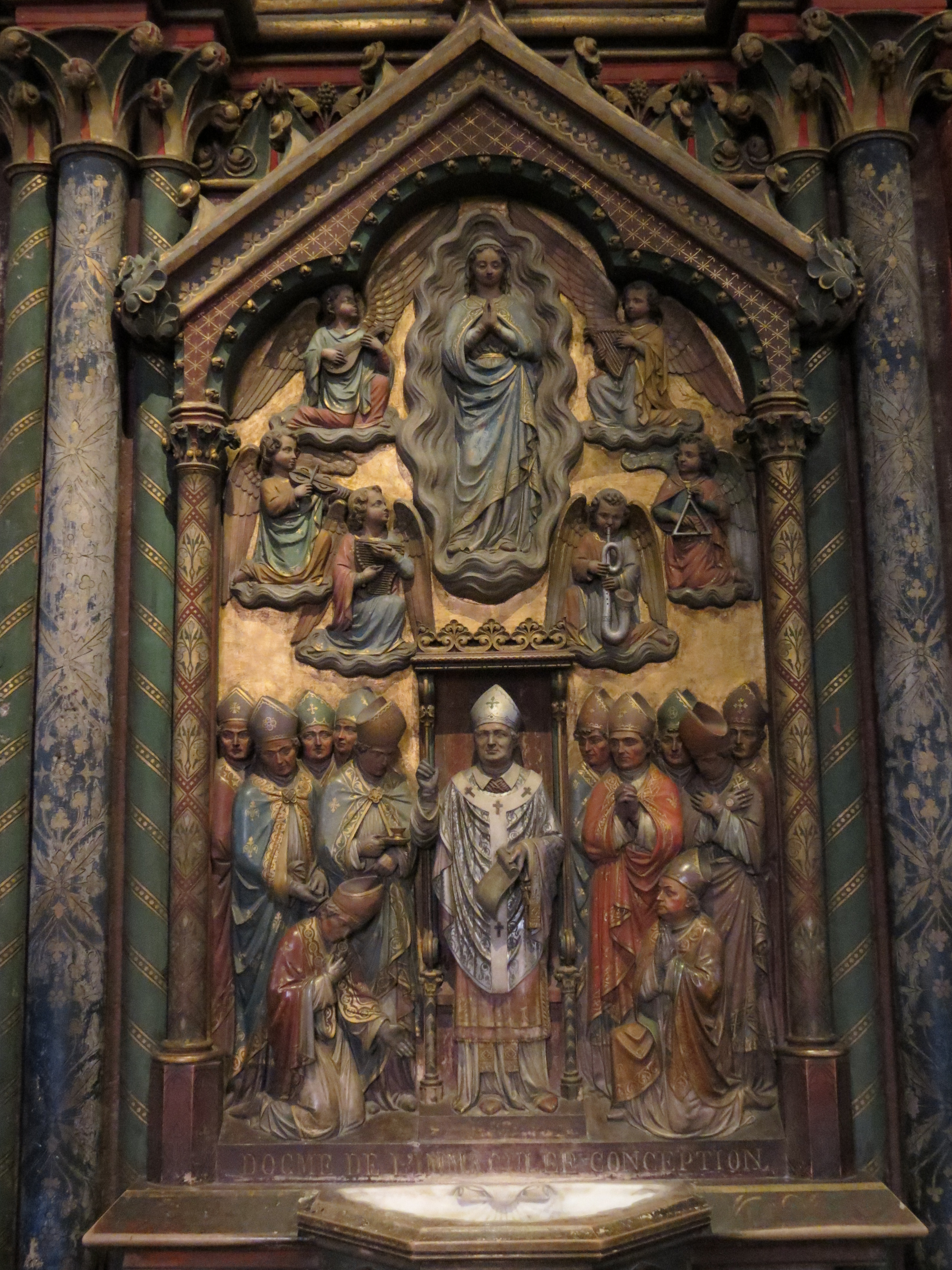
Relief

== Sources ==
- Architecture (in French), Notre Dame de Bonsecours
- Basciano, Jessica (2017-01-18), "Notre-Dame de Bonsecours (1840-1844) and the Catholic Context of the French Gothic Revival", in Timothy Brittain-Catlin; Jan De Maeyer; Martin Bressani (eds.), Gothic Revival Worldwide: A.W.N. Pugin's Global Influence, Leuven University Press, ISBN 978-94-6270-091-8
- Bonsecours, Basilique Notre-Dame (in French), AEOLUS
- Didron (1847), "Vandalisme dans les travaux d'arts", Annales archéologiques (in French), Libr. Archéologique de Didron
- Fromentin, Alexandre (1855), Eglise Notre-Dame de Bonsecours: pélerinage artistique et religieux (in French), P. Roussel et C.ie
- Guéroult, Guillaume, "Henry Barbet", Geneanet (in French)
- Historique de la basilique et du pèlerinage (in French), Notre Dame de Bonsecours
- Stefano, Roberto Di; Solans, Francisco Javier Ramón (2016-11-23), Marian Devotions, Political Mobilization, and Nationalism in Europe and America, Springer, ISBN 978-3-319-43443-8
- Wheeler, Michael (1999-11-28), Ruskin's God, Cambridge University Press, ISBN 978-0-521-57414-3
