= Royal Marine Regiment (France) =

Régiment de Royal Marine
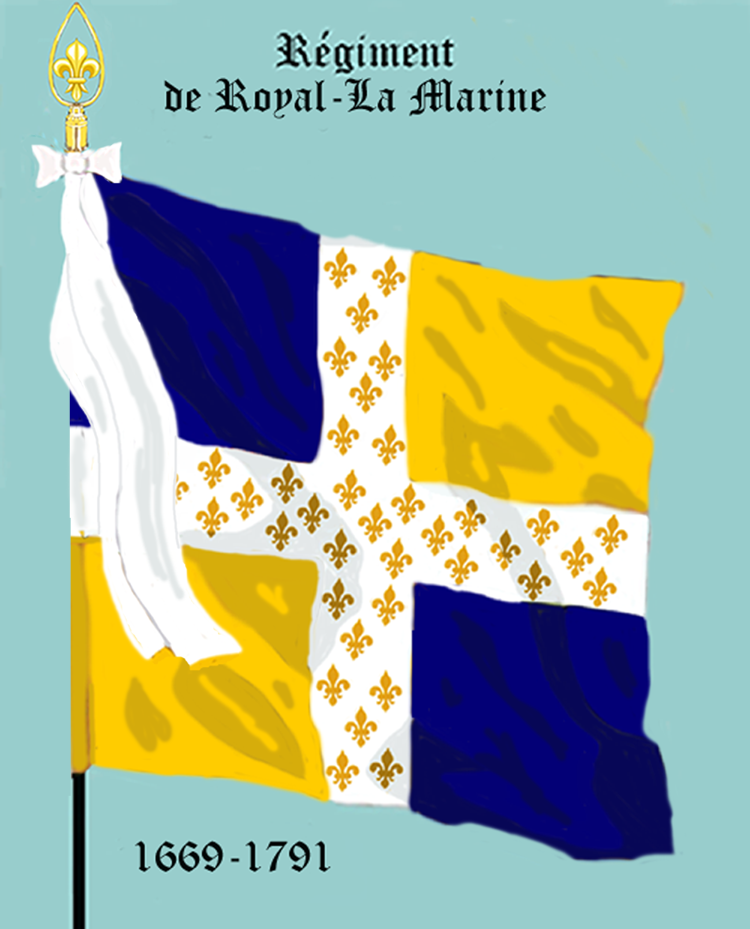
- Ordinance colors of the Régiment Royal–La Marine
- Active: 20 December 1669 – 21 March 1797
- Country: France
- Allegiance: Kingdom of France
- Type: Regiment
- Role: Line Infantry

The Régiment de Royal Marine was an infantry regiment of the Kingdom of France, established in 1669. The regiment was directly involved in the Day of the Tiles (French: Journée des Tuiles), which took place in Grenoble on June 7, 1788. The last unit of the regiment was incorporated into the 23 demi-brigade on March 21, 1797 and the regiment ceased to exist.

== Lineage ==
- December 20, 1669 : creation of Régiment Royal–La Marine.
- 1671 : transferred to the French Army
- January 1, 1791 : renamed 60th Line Infantry Regiment (French: 60^{e} Régiment d'Infanterie)
- 1769 : the 1st battalion was reformed by incorporation into the 20th Line Infantry Demi-Brigade (French: 20^{e} demi-brigade d’infanterie de ligne) during the formation of the demi-brigade.
- March 21, 1797 : reformed, the 2nd battalion was incorporated into the 23rd Line Infantry Demi-Brigade (French: 23^{e} demi-brigade d’infanterie de ligne) during the formation of the demi-brigade.

== Equipment ==
=== Flags ===
Royal-La Marine Regiment had three flags: one "blanc Colonel" (white cross with golden fleur-de-lis), and two "drapeaux d'Ordonnance" (blue and auroras)

Drapeau d’Ordonnance & Colonel

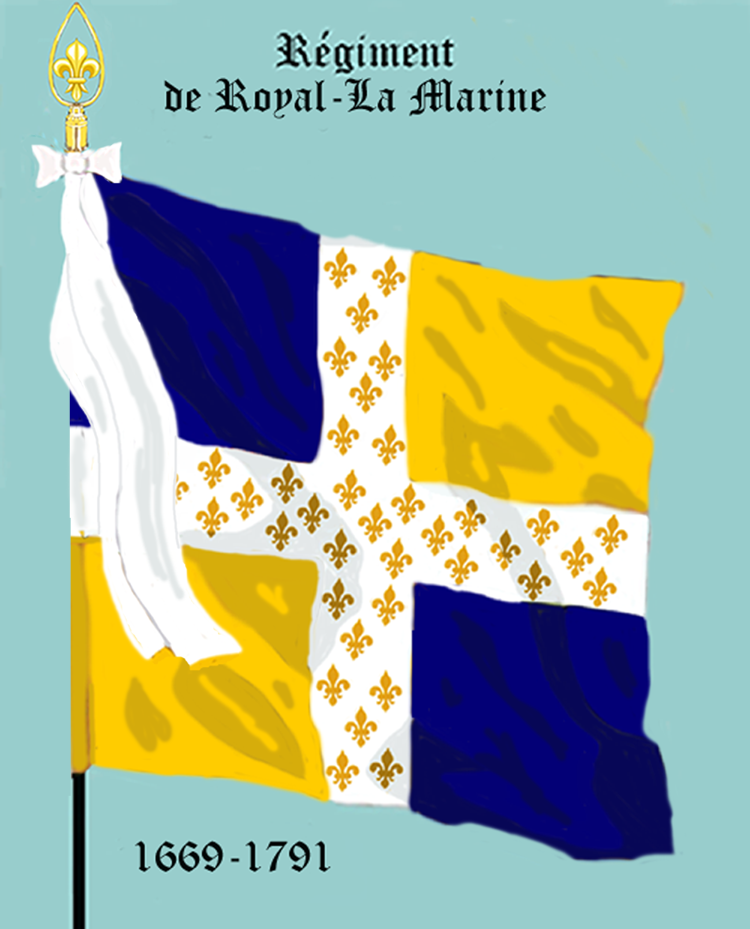
Régiment Royal–La Marine from 1669 to 1791

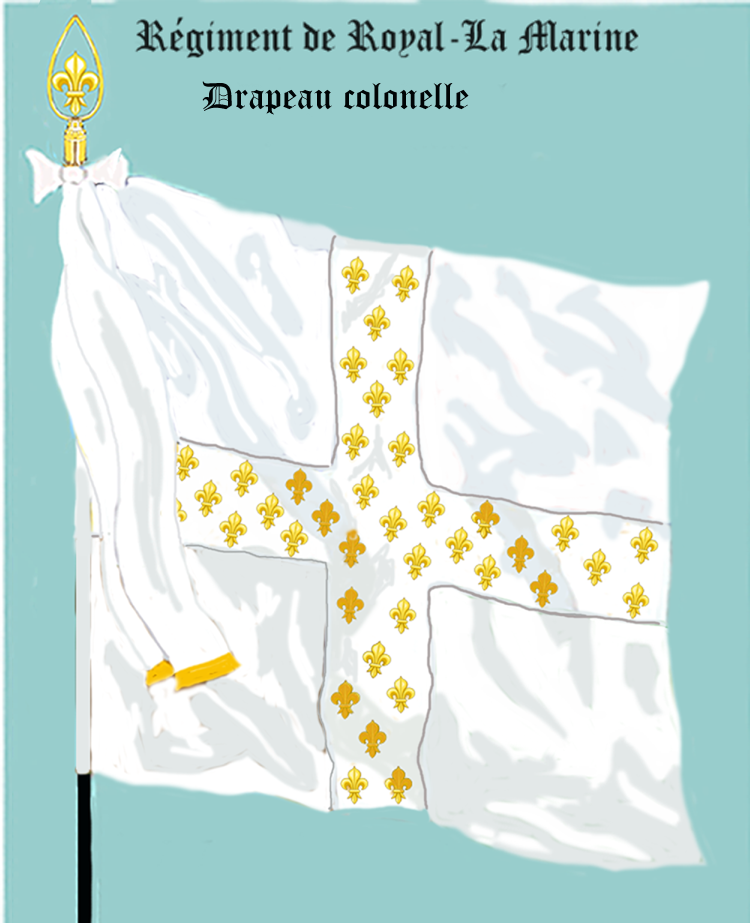
Régiment Royal-La Marine Colonel

=== Uniforms ===
Uniforms

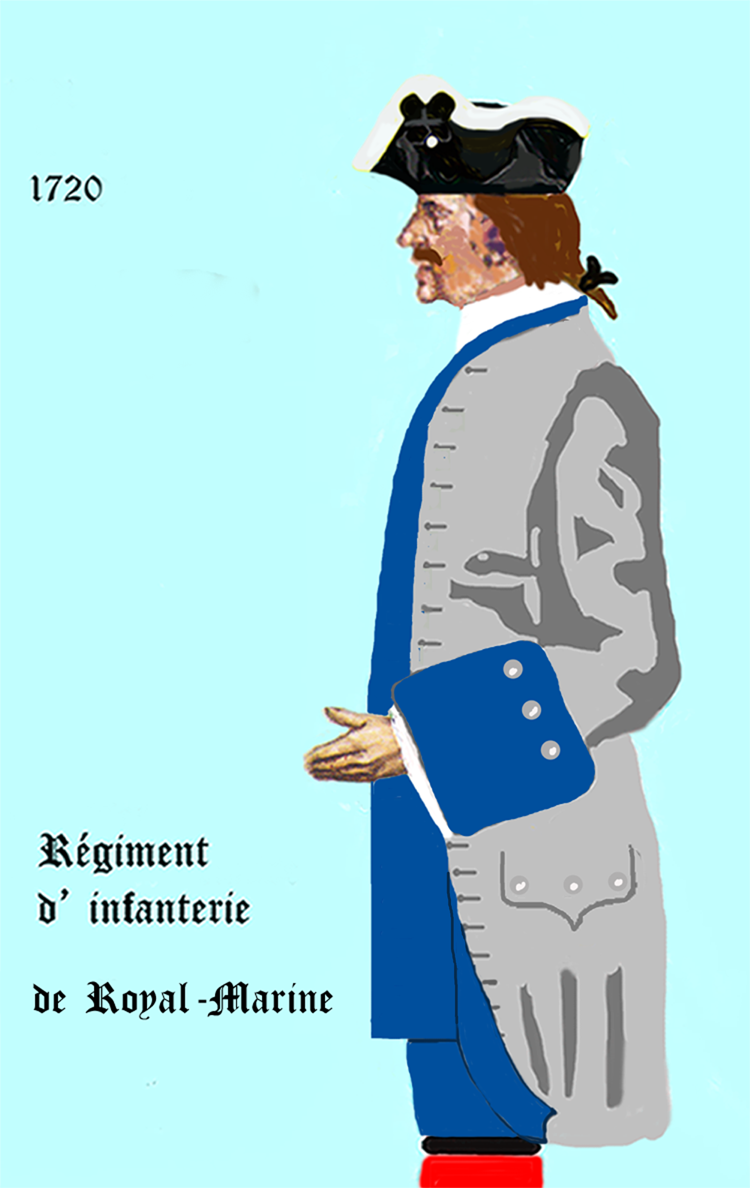
Royal-La Marine Regiment from 1720 to 1734

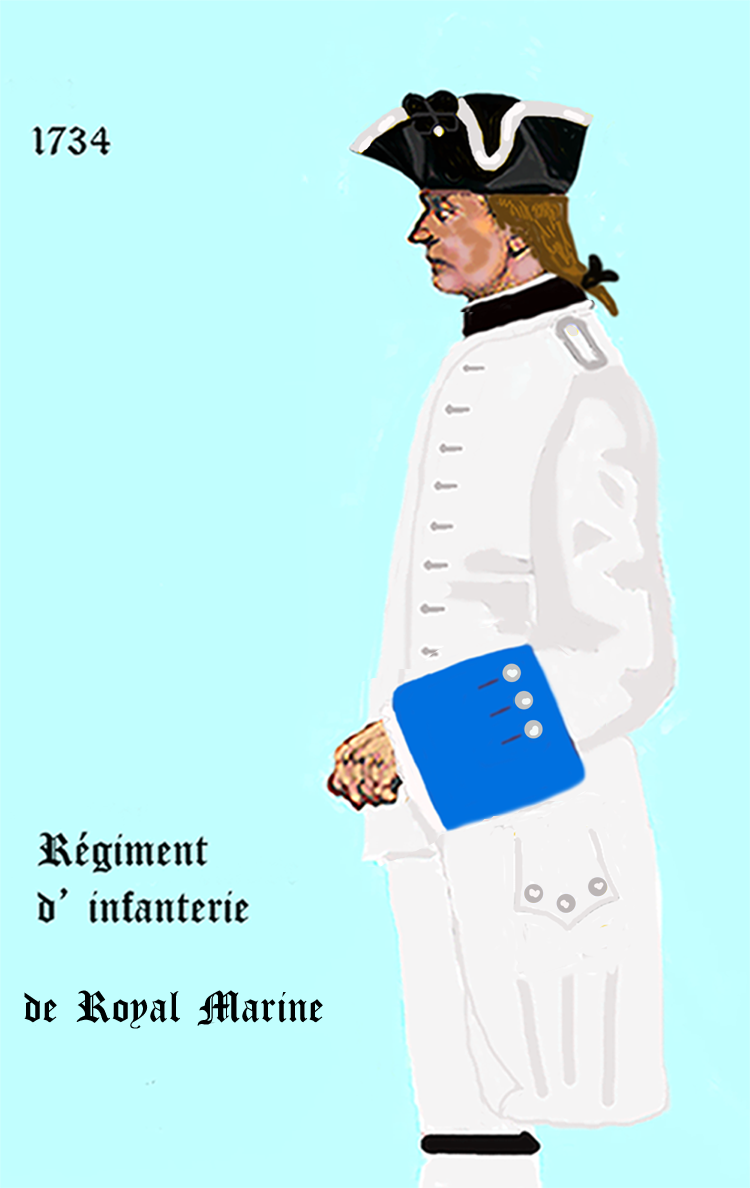
Royal-La Marine Regiment from 1734 to 1757

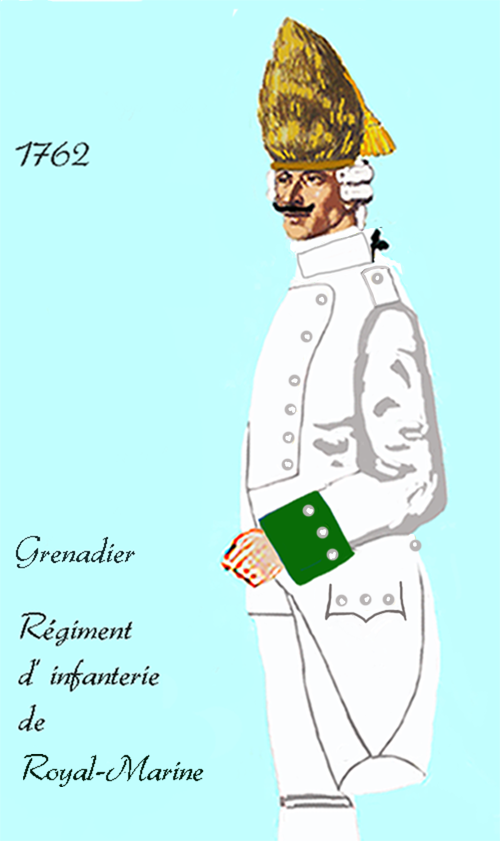
Grenadier at Royal-La Marine Regiment from 1762 to 1776
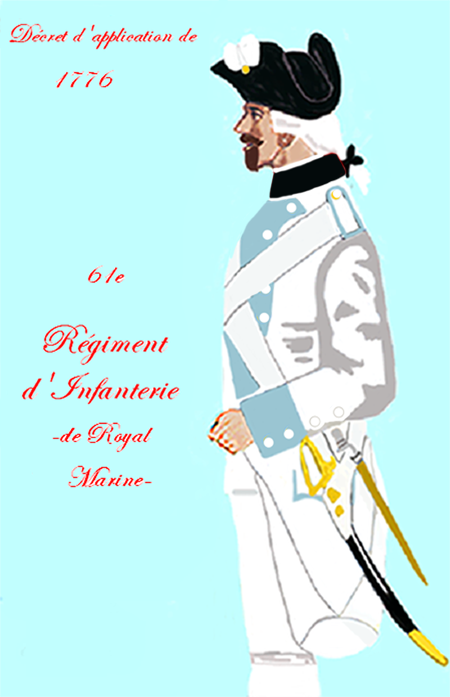
Royal-La Marine Regiment from 1776 to 1779

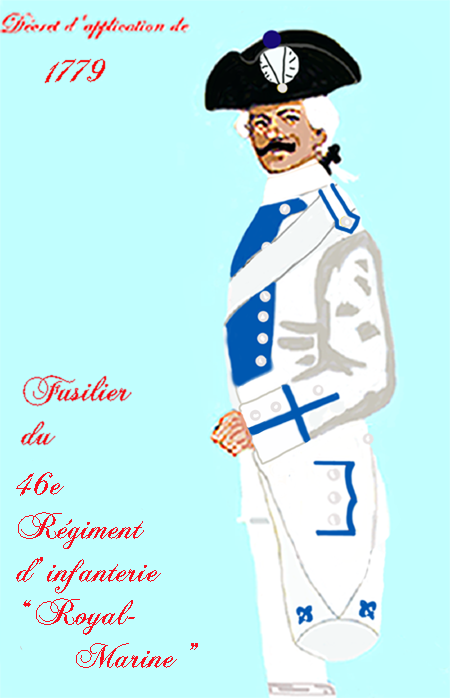
Royal-La Marine Regiment from 1779 to 1791

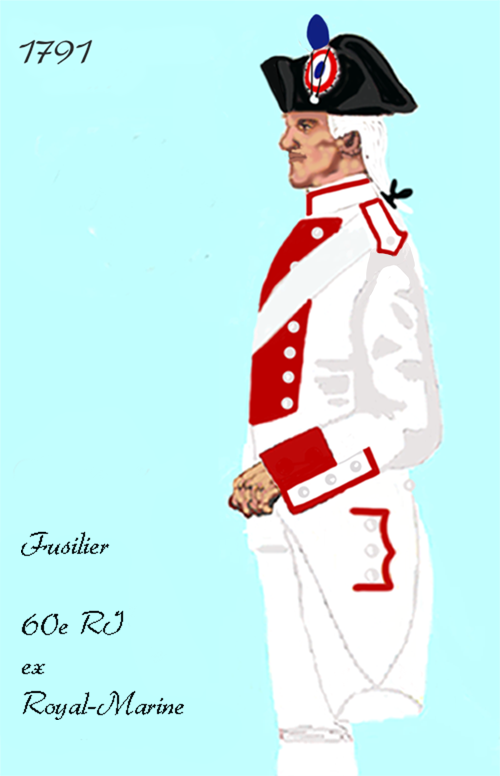
60th Line Infantry Regiment 1791 to 1797

== Colonels and Mestres de camp ==
- December 24, 1669 : Henri Charles de Beaumanoir, marquis of Lavardin
- 1672 : N., comte de Clere
- November 1, 1674 : Antoine de Pas de Feuquières, marquis of Feuquières
- August 4, 1676 : Louis-Fauste de Brichanteau, marquis of Nangis, brigadier since April 26, 1689, † 22 août 1690
- September 3, 1690 : Louis Armand de Brichanteau, marquis of Nangis, brigadier le since October 26, 1704, maréchal de camp since June 19, 1708, lieutenant général since March 8, 1718, maréchal de France since February 11, 1741, † October 8, 1742
- September 12, 1699 : Charles d’Angennes de Poigny, count of Angennes de Poigny, brigadier since June 19, 1708, † September 11, 1709
- October 1, 1709 : Louis Desmarets de Maillebois, baron of Châteauneuf, brigadier since February 1, 1719
- January 10, 1727 : Louis de Pardaillan de Gondrin, marquis, then duke of Antin, brigadier since August 1, 1734, maréchal de camp since February 10, 1743, † December 9, 1743
- March 10, 1734 : Louis de Durfort Duras, knight, then count, then duke of Lorges, brigadier since February 20, 1743, maréchal de camp since June 1, 1745, lieutenant général since May 10, 1748, † December 10, 1775
- May 26, 1745 : Joachim de Dreux, knight, then marquis of Dreux, brigadier since 1745, Maréchal de camp since 1748, lieutenant général since December 17, 1759
- February 1, 1749 : Louis-Marie-François-Gaston de Lévis, marquis of Mirepoix, brigadier since July 13, 1756
- July 28, 1759 : Louis-Marie de Chapelle, count of Jumilhac
- December 1, 1762 : Charles-Emmanuel, knight of Saint-Mauris
- June 22, 1767 : Philippe-Mathieu-Marie, count of Lons
- January 1, 1784 : Agricole-Marie de Merle, marquis of Ambert
- July 25, 1791 : Marie-Joseph-Gabriel-Apollinaire Morard d’Arcès
- November 23, 1791 : Henri-François Morille de Boulard.

== Campaigns and battles ==
In December 1669, Colbert - who assumed command of naval (la marine) services after having nominated in November Louis de Bourbon, the legitimate heir of Louis XIV, aged only ten years, to the Admiralty of France - enacted an ordinance which created two regiments destined for naval service on the vessels and in the colonies. The regiments were designated « Royal-La Marine » and « Amiral ».

The regiment Royal-La Marine was attached to the Flotte du Ponant.

The Royal Navy (French: Marine royale) in need of quality marine offices, nominated the possibility of having naval officers of the two regiment as marine officers. In the same spirit on December 26, 1669, was constituted, a « Garde de Monsieur l'Amiral » ( Guard of Monsieur Admiral ), even referred as « Garde de Monsieur le comte de Vermandois » ( Guard of Monsieur the Count of Vermandois ), which was created to become a crucible of marine officers.

With Louvois intervention, a new regulation of July 1670 passed the nomination of the officers of these two regiments - attached to the navy since creation - to the authority of the ministère de la Guerre, while also amending the possibility to pass naval officers to form the officers marine corps. Such a new regulation was the first passage of the "bigor" of the navy (French: Marine) to the French Army.

The only service at sea of these two regiments was brief. In August 1670, they embarked on the fleet of Duquesne on their way to the Canary Islands and Green Cape, and were back in Brest on March 11, 1671.

On August 13, 1704, while through the decisive Battle of Blenheim (French: Höchstädt), during the War of the Spanish Succession (French: guerre de Succession d'Espagne), Le Royal-La Marine was part of the reserve army of maréchal Marsin, foreseen to support the Franco-Bavarian, placed under the command of Camille d'Hostun, duc de Tallard and Maximilian II Emanuel, Elector of Bavaria.

From 1720 to 1721, the regiment was garrisoned at Souppes sur Loing (Seine et Marne) and participated in the construction of the canal du Loing.

On June 27, 1743, the regiment participated in the Battle of Dettingen (French: bataille de Dettingen). The following year, the regiment participated in the Siege of Menin (1744), the Siege of Ypres (1744), then Furnes, prior to joining the army of maréchal de Saxe at Courtrai.

From 1779 to 1782, the régiment Royal-La Marine participated in operations in the Antilles.

The 1st battalion of the 60th Line Infantry Regiment conducted the campaign of 1794 at the armée de l'Ouest (French: armée de l'Ouest); the 2^{e}, embarked at La Rochelle in 1792 for Saint-Domingue, where garrison would be held until 1794.

== Personalities having served in the Régiment Royal–La Marine ==
- Joseph Claude Vincent de Kermoysan, Breton knight, was Captain of the Regiment between 1740 and 1750.
- In 1780, Amateur-Jérôme Le Bras des Forges de Boishardy (French: Amateur-Jérôme Le Bras des Forges de Boishardy), son of a musketeer, entered the Regiment, where he stayed twelve years.
- In the same year, Jean Baptiste Bernadotte (French: Charles XIV Jean), future Marshal of France and then King of Sweden and Norway, began his military career by entering the regiment as a soldier at the age of 17. In 1789, he became sergeant.

== See also ==
- Troupes de la marine

=== Further reading ===
- Jean Boudriot et Michel Pétard, « Marine Royale - XVII et XVIIIème siècles », Éditions Ancre
- Chronologie historique-militaire, par M. Pinard, tomes 3, 5 et 7, Paris 1761, 1762 et 1764
