= Day of the Tiles =

1788 event of popular unrest in Grenoble, France

Coordinates: 45.1893°N 5.7299°E

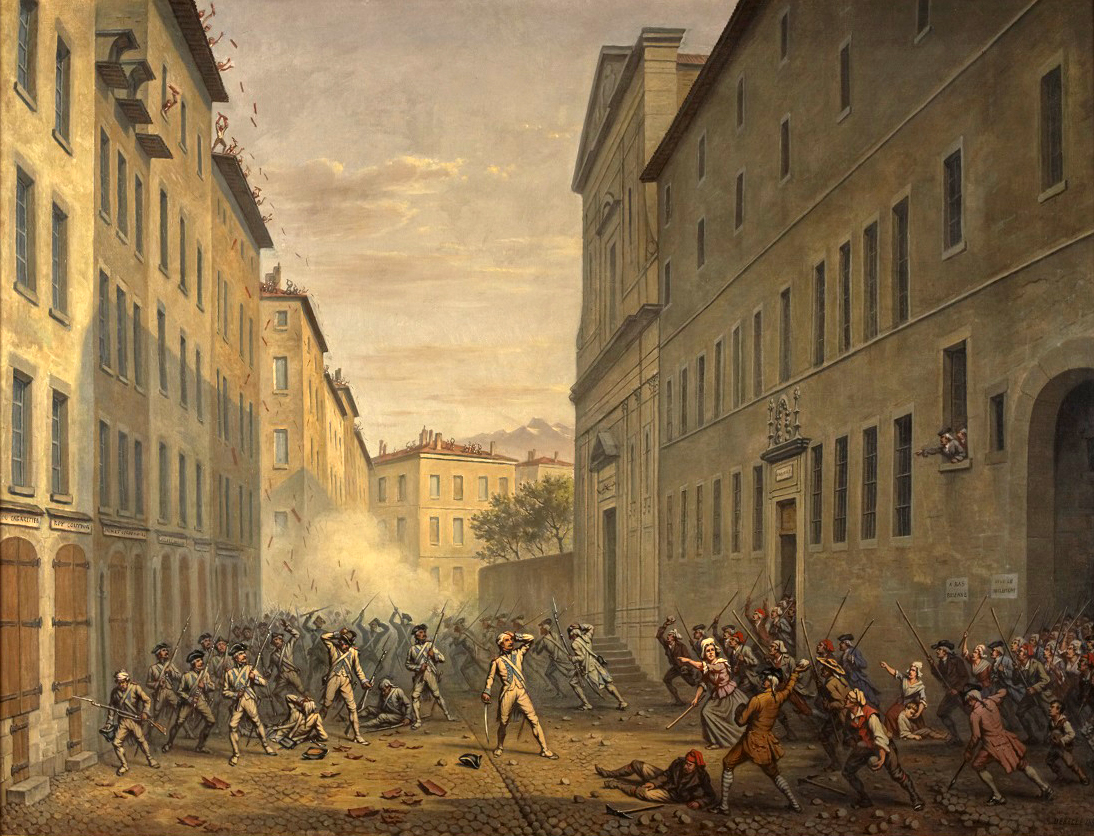
La Journée des tuiles en 1788 à Grenoble, 1890 painting by Alexandre Debelle (Musée de la Révolution française)

The Day of the Tiles (French: Journée des Tuiles) was an event that took place in the French town of Grenoble on 7 June 1788. It was one of the first disturbances preceding the French Revolution and is credited by a few historians as its start.

== Background ==
Various economic crises induced the financial hardship that caused popular unrest in Grenoble. The sources of the French Revolution affected all of France, but matters came to a head in Grenoble first. A depressed demand for luxury gloves (at the time one of Grenoble's major industries), left it heavily dependent on its status as the seat of the regional parlement for status and prosperity. However, Cardinal Étienne Charles de Loménie de Brienne, the Archbishop of Toulouse and Controlleur whom Louis XVI appointed on 8 April 1787, was attempting to abolish the parlements to work around their refusal to enact a new tax to deal with France's unmanageable public debt.

Poor harvests, the high cost of bread, and the refusal of the privileged classes—the clergy and the aristocracy, who insisted on retaining the right to collect feudal and seignorial royalties from their peasants and landholders—to relinquish any of their fiscal privileges increased tensions in urban populations. This blocked the reforms of the king's minister Charles Alexandre de Calonne and the Assembly of Notables of January 1787. Added to this, Brienne was widely regarded as being a manager without experience or imagination.

Shortly before 7 June 1788, a large meeting of judges at Grenoble decided to call together the old Estates of the province of Dauphiné, which was one of the bodies across France that traditionally had assessed taxes for the provinces. The government responded by sending troops to the area to put down the movement.

== Riots ==
At roughly 10:00 in the morning of Saturday, 7 June, merchants closed their shops as groups of 300 to 400 men and women formed, armed with stones, sticks, axes, and bars. They rushed to the city gates to prevent the departure of judges who took part in the Grenoble meeting. Some rioters attempted to cross the Isère but faced a picket of 50 soldiers at the St. Lawrence bridge, while others headed to the Rue Neuve.

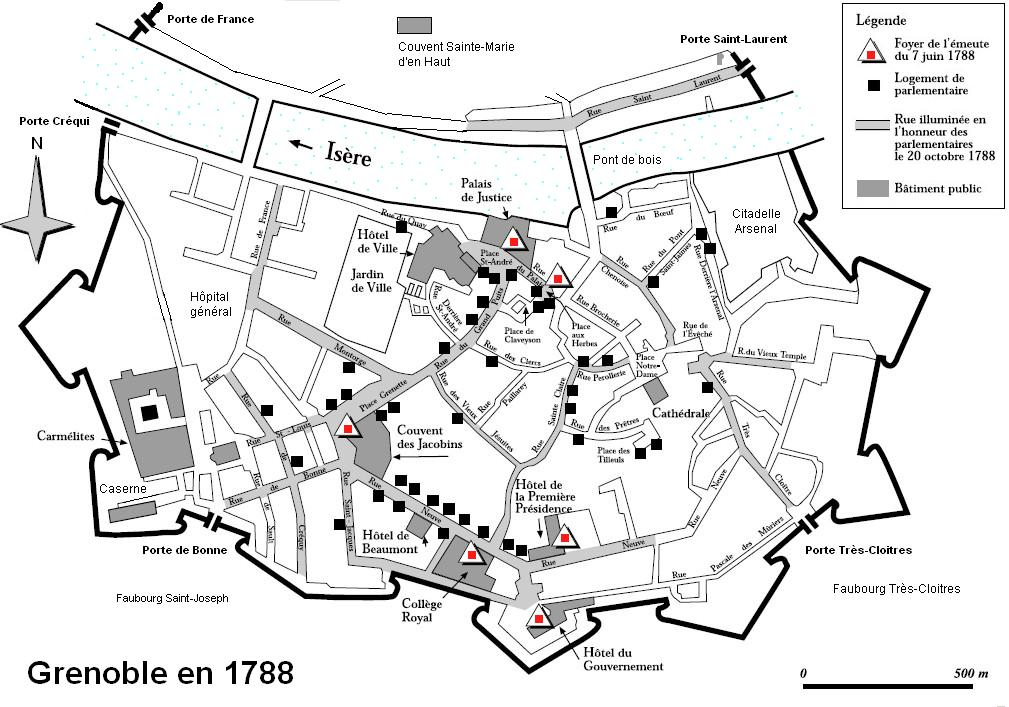
Map of Grenoble in 1788: The six red dots show the riots in the city. The black squares show the dwellings of the parlementaires.

The cathedral's bells were seized by French peasants at noon. The crowd swiftly grew, as the bells provoked the influx of neighbouring peasants to creep into the city, climbing the walls, using boats on the Isère and for some, pushing open the city gates.

Other insurgents boarded the ramparts and rushed to the hotel (L'hôtel de la Première présidence) the Duke of Clermont-Tonnerre was staying in at the time. The Duke had two elite regiments in Grenoble, the Royal Regiment of the Navy (Régiment Royal-La-Marine) whose colonel was Marquis d'Ambert and the regiment of Austrasia (Régiment d'Austrasie) which was commanded by Colonel Count Chabord. The Royal Regiment of the Navy was the first to respond to the growing crowds and was given the order to quell the rioting without the use of arms. However, as the mob stormed the hotel entrance, the situation escalated. Soldiers sent to quell the disturbances forced the townspeople off the streets. Some sources say that the soldiers were sent to disperse parlementaires who were attempting to assemble a parlement. During an attack, Royal Regiment of the Navy soldiers injured a 75-year-old man with a bayonet. At the sight of blood, the people became angry and started to tear up the streets. Townspeople climbed onto the roofs of buildings around the Jesuit College to hurl down a rain of roof tiles on the soldiers in the streets below, hence the episode's name. Many soldiers took refuge in a building to shoot through the windows, while the crowd continued to rush inside and ravage everything.

A noncommissioned officer of the Royal Regiment of the Navy, commanding a patrol of four soldiers, gave the order to open fire into the mob. One civilian was killed and a boy of 12 wounded. To the east of the city, the Royal Regiment of the Navy soldiers were forced to open fire in order to protect the city's arsenal, fearing that the rioters would seize the weapons and ammunition. Meanwhile, Colonel Count Chabord began deploying the regiment of Austrasia to aid and relieve the Royal Regiment of the Navy soldiers.

Three of the city's four consuls gathered at the City Hall and attempted to reason with the crowd. However, their words were silenced amidst the clamour of the mob. Through great difficulty, the consuls made their way through the crowds and eventually took refuge with the officers of the local garrison. Later that evening, the Duke of Clermont-Tonnerre withdrew his troops from the streets and hotel to prevent further violence from escalating the situation. The Duke managed to narrowly escape the hotel before the crowd completely looted the inside. With control of the hotel lost, the Royal Regiment of the Navy troops were ordered to return to their quarters.

At six, a crowd estimated at ten thousand people shouting "Vive le parlement!" forced the judges to return to the Palace of the Parlement of Dauphiné (Palais du Parlement du Dauphiné) by flooding them with flowers. Throughout the night, carillons sounded triumphantly, a large bonfire crackled on Saint-André square surrounded by a crowd that danced and sang "Long live forever our parliament! May God preserve the King and the devil take Brienne and Lamoignon."

On 10 June, the local commander attempted to appease the spirits of the crowd, with no success. Under the orders of exile pronounced against them by the King, the parlementaires were forced to flee from Grenoble on the morning of 12 June. Order was fully restored in the city on the 14th of July by Marshal Vaux, who replaced the Duke of Clermont-Tonnerre.

The commander of the troops found the situation so alarming that he agreed to allow the meeting of the Estates to proceed, but not in the capital. A meeting was therefore arranged for the 21 July 1788 at the nearby village of Vizille. This meeting became known as the Assembly of Vizille.

In all, six outbreaks of rioting have been identified in the city on 7 June.

== Later events ==
In the face of overwhelming public pressure, on 5 July 1788, Brienne announced that the Estates-General would convene as quickly as it could be arranged. At Brienne's recommendation, Louis XVI affirmed this intention on August 8, 1788. The assembly was scheduled for April 27, 1789, but this was later delayed until 1 May 1789.

The meeting of the three Estates which had been agreed to took place at Vizille on 21 July. Several hundred people assembled, representing the three Estates, the nobility, the clergy and the middle class (the bourgeoisie), who were granted double representation. The meeting was led by a moderate reformist lawyer, Jean Joseph Mounier, and passed resolutions:

- convoking the States-General of France;
- pledging the province to refuse to pay all taxes not voted by the Estates-General; and
- calling for the abolition of arbitrary imprisonment on the King's order by the warrant known as the lettre de cachet.

Since 1984, the Château de Vizille houses the Musée de la Révolution française.

== Significance ==
Some historians, such as Jonathan Sperber, have used the Day of the Tiles to demonstrate the worsening situation in France in the buildup to the French Revolution of 1789. Others have regarded it as the being the beginning of the revolution itself. The events as related by R. M. Johnston provide an apparently clear link between the Day of the Tiles, the Assembly of Vizille and the start of the revolution proper.

The event was commemorated by Alexandre Debelle's The Day of the Tiles, 13 July 1788, painted in 1889. He painted it a century after the event and got the date wrong, but it undoubtedly attempts to depict the events described by the title.
