= Amateur-Jérôme Le Bras des Forges de Boishardy =

Chouan leader (1762–1795)

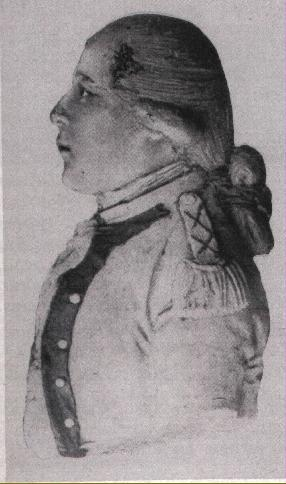
- Daguerreotype made from a cast kept at the Boishardy manor.
- Nickname: The Sorcerer
- Born: 13 October 1762; Bréhand, Kingdom of France
- Died: 17 June 1795 (aged 32) Moncontour, French First Republic
- Allegiance: France; Breton Association
- Service years: 1780–1795
- Rank: Colonel
- Commands: Division of Lamballe and Moncontour
- Awards: Order of Saint Louis

Amateur-Jérôme Le Bras de Forges, (13 October 1762 – 17 or 18 June 1795) was knight of Boishardy, born in Bréhand and died near Moncontour, is a Chouan chief of the Côtes-du-Nord.

== Biography ==
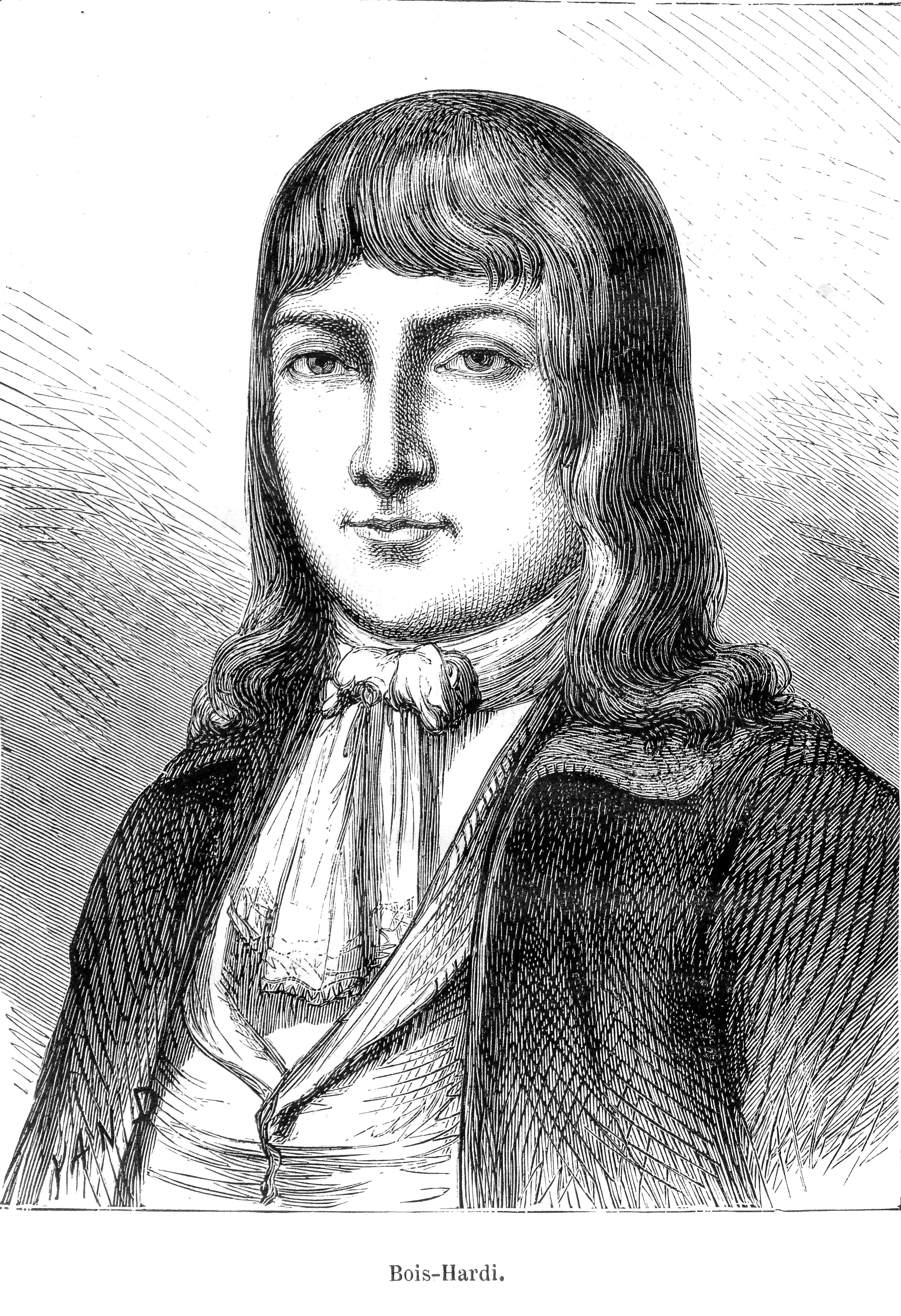
Portrait of Boishardy by Yan' Dargent.

Amateur-Jérôme Le Bras des Forges de Boishardy belongs to the minor nobility (knight). However, the origins of his family would be bourgeois. He is the son of Jérôme Sylvestre Le Bras des Forges, lord of Boishardy, musketeer of the King, and of Marie Anne du Boscq.

As a nobleman, he entered the Royal Marine in 1780, a former officer in the Royal Marine regiment, left the service on 9 July 1792, opposing the departure of his regiment for Saint-Domingue. He was mistakenly included on the list of émigrés in 1792 and this error caused him some inconvenience and he returned to Bréhand. But it was the levy of 300,000 men in March 1793 that pushed him towards the Chouannerie.

The French Revolution, needing soldiers, ordered that a draw of combatants be organized by commune. On 25 March 1793, Pommeret, 8 km from Bréhand, refused the draw and tore up the registers of the commissioners of the Republic. This was the signal for the uprising in the Côtes-du-Nord. To the cries of March on Pommeret, the young people of Bréhand then headed, Boishardy at their head, towards the rebel commune. They were joined on the road at the place called la lande du gras in Meslin by the young people of the surrounding communes. Together (perhaps 4000), they marched on Pommeret and harassed the republican grocer of the town.

The same day, they looted the republican mail box in Sainte-Anne (Coëtmieux). Following this insurrection, François Pincemin, the brand new mayor of Meslin, was arrested, imprisoned in Saint-Brieuc and guillotined on the following 13 April. The events in Pommeret spread, particularly to Bréhand, where young people followed suit. The insurgents came looking for Boishardy because of his military experience and not because of his noble origins.

Boishardy, charismatic and accessible, naturally established himself as the leader of the Chouannerie in the region. He took part in the first insurrection, that of La Rouërie, and was designated by him to command the military forces of the Breton Association on the Côtes-du-Nord. He was also recognized elsewhere since he was in contact with the Vendéen François de Charette. But the Chouannerie in the Lamballe region remained limited. His guerrilla actions remained limited, although he took Jugon-les-Lacs, a small town between Lamballe and Dinan, where he cut down the tree of liberty, wandered around with his men while talking to the inhabitants. He earned his nickname of Sorcerer, because the capture did not result in any deaths and all the Republican soldiers were captured.

After the death of La Rouërie, he withdrew towards the coast between Lamballe and Moncontour; and, gathering together all that was arming itself against the Revolution, he established his headquarters at Bréhand. Boishardy was in the prime of life, and as skillful as he was intrepid, his influence over the peasants was such that they would all have exposed themselves to death to defend him, and that he passed into their minds to predict the future.

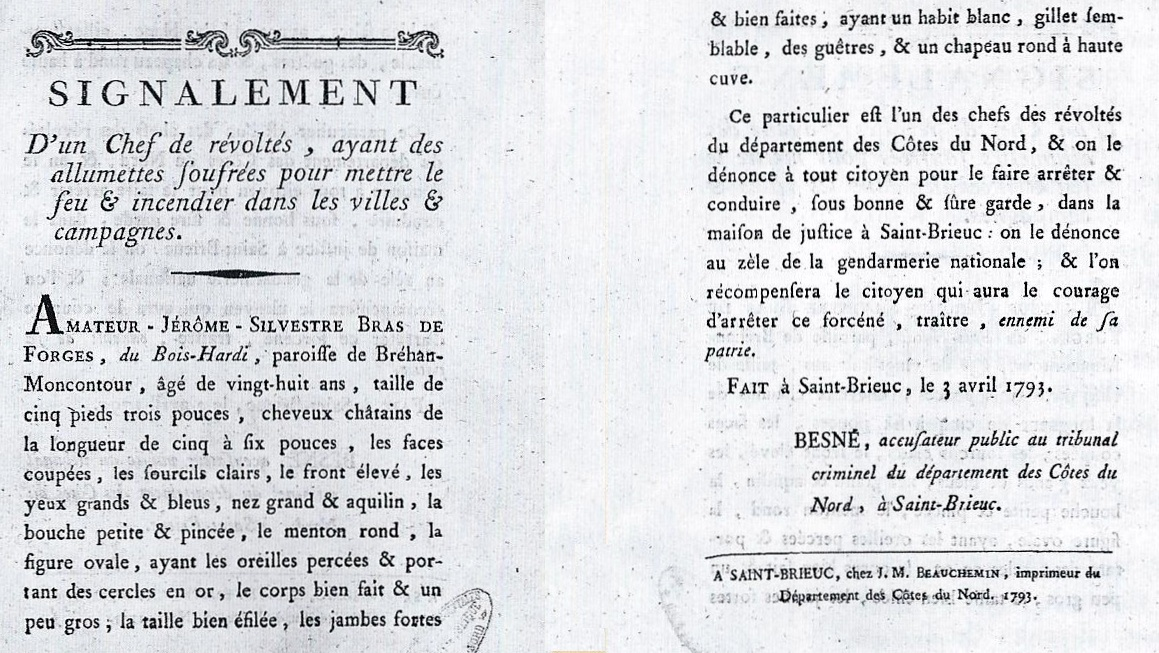
Indictment of Amateur-Jérôme-Sylvestre Bras de Forges, known as Bois-Hardy, by the public prosecutor Besné at the criminal court of the Côtes-du-Nord department, in Saint-Brieuc (1793).

Boishardy, an outlaw, is elusive, hiding between Pommeret, Bréhand and Moncontour according to his many friendships. He is nicknamed "the Sorcerer" by the Republicans.

Moreover, his gentle manners and the amenity of his character made him generally liked. In August 1794, he went to find Puisaye and recognized him as generalissimo of the Chouans. Puisaye made him colonel and gave him the Order of Saint-Louis. He commanded the royalists of the Côtes-du-Nord; and in October 1794, seeing himself overwhelmed by the division of the Republican General Louis Emmanuel Rey, and authorized by the example of Charette, he believed to avert the danger by making peace overtures. Having requested an interview with General Jean Humbert, who commanded a Republican division at Moncontour, he indicated to him, in the first days of December, a wood for the place of the conference, and he found himself there with fifty armed Chouans. Humbert arrived alone, without any escort. The royalist general, astonished by the security of this officer, said to him: The testimony of confidence that you give me decides me to reciprocity; I will send my troops back, and seek with you the means to bring peace to these unfortunate regions! Boishardy's friendships are not only royalist, a deep and shared respect binds him to the republican general Humbert thanks to whom he signs a truce with Lazare Hoche who also esteems him (March 1795).

After the pacification, the truce was not respected and attacks were committed in the Boishardy sector. Hostilities having resumed between the two parties, Boishardy resumed the offensive. The pursuit of the Sorcerer resumed and a republican camp was set up in Meslin.

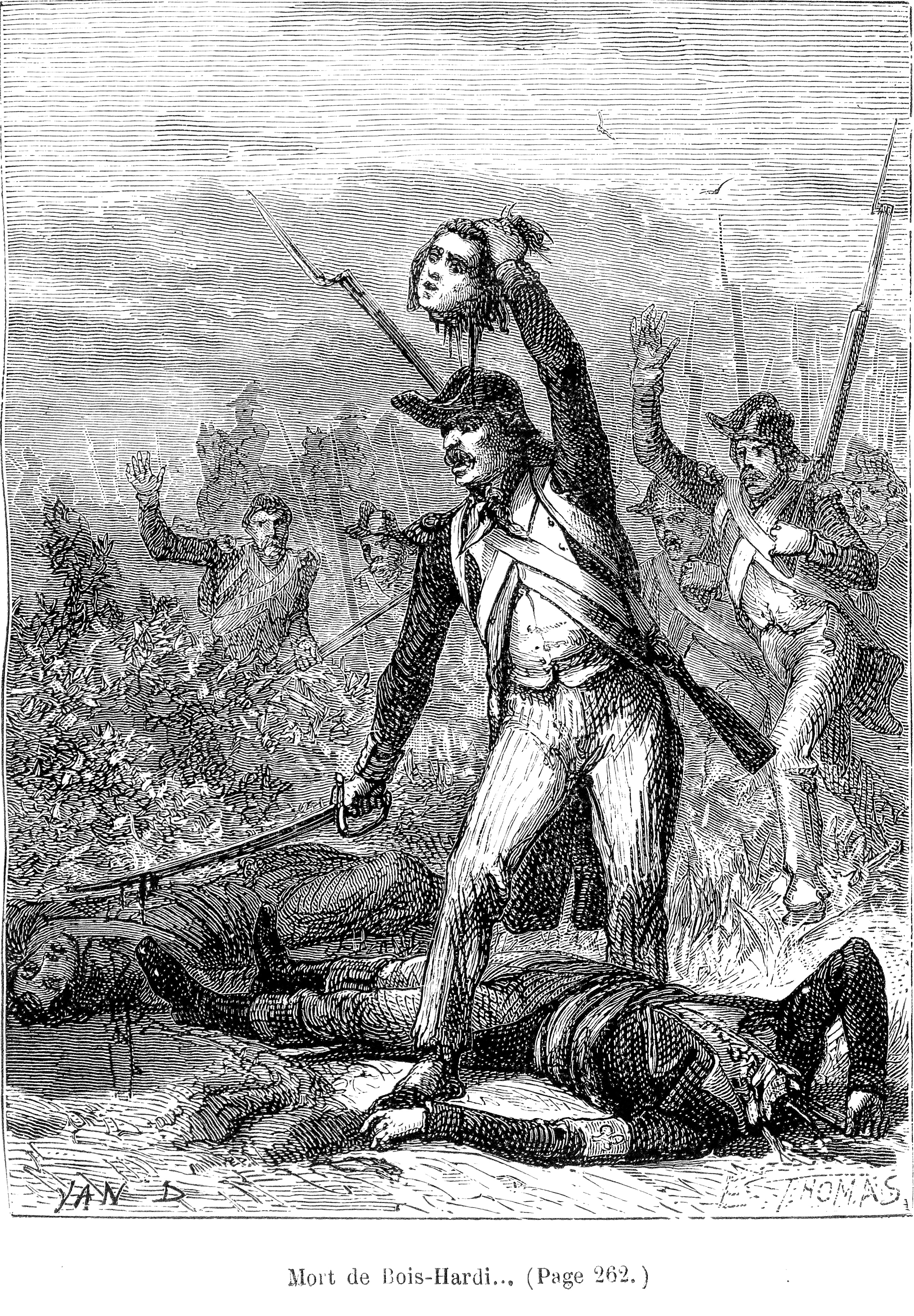
The death of Boishardy (by Yan' Dargent).

The Republicans having been informed that he would be in his castle in Villehemet on 15 June 1795, a company of grenadiers marched to surprise him there. He was due to get married on the night of 16–17 June. He was betrayed by a young man he had taken in. Boishardy realised the betrayal too late; he wanted to flee: the grenadiers pursued him with rifle shots; he was hit and finished off with sabre blows by two soldiers on the road from Bréhand to Moncontour, near the Saint-Malo chapel (a calvary, called the Croix de Boishardy, still marks the place today) in the presence of his young friend Anne Joséphine Quentin de Kercadio. His bloody head, separated from his body, was paraded through the streets of Lamballe and Moncontour then thrown into the Launay pond. The two assassins were very lightly punished. Later, the pond was drained and Boishardy's skull was found; it now rests in the Maroué cemetery.

The Chouannerie, deprived of a great charismatic leader, then changed in the Côtes-du-Nord. It evolved into a micro-Chouannerie (with local leaders such as Legris-Duval, Duviquet, Carfort) until 1800, where small, simply organized groups attacked reduced numbers in ambushes and harassment fights. Pierre Taupin was a prominent figure in this new form of Chouannerie. He was a man who burned to avenge the execution of his wife, guillotined in Tréguier a few years earlier. Sentenced to penal servitude in Guyana, he managed to escape in incredible circumstances and returned to Trégor to raise a small troop of Chouans. He sowed terror in the east of the Tréguier region through multiple ambushes and lightning-fast mobility, making their arrest difficult. He was killed during the battle of Tréglamus in 1800.

It then evolved into Chouannerie-brigandage from 1800 to 1804. One leader is particularly representative, Félix Dujardin. His expeditions are the work of very small groups, five Chouans maximum, and harass with multiple small targeted attacks.

Symbolically, the Chouannerie of the Côtes-du-Nord remained important. Mercier la Vendée, assistant to Georges Cadoudal, was appointed head of the department (killed near Loudéac in 1801) and that Saint-Régent, head of the Merdrignac region, would be the executor of the first assassination attempt against Napoleon (Christmas 1800).

Boishardy's story has something romantic about it, especially because of his charisma, his romance with Joséphine de Kercadio, and his tragic death. For the royalists, he became "Achilles for his bravery, Ulysses for the fertility of his inventions." Balzac is said to have drawn inspiration from his story in his novel Les Chouans. The version of events according to which his assassination took place on the eve of his wedding is not accepted by all historians.

== Bibliography ==
- « Amateur-Jérôme Le Bras des Forges de Boishardy », dans Louis-Gabriel Michaud, Biographie universelle ancienne et moderne : histoire par ordre alphabétique de la vie publique et privée de tous les hommes avec la collaboration de plus de 300 savants et littérateurs français ou étrangers, 2e édition, 1843–1865 [détail de l’édition].
- G. Lenotre, La Mirlitantouille : Épisodes de la chouannerie bretonne, Perrin, Paris, 1925.
- Chanoine Hervé Pommeret, Boishardy, l'histoire et la légende, Bulletin de la Société d'émulation des Côtes-du-Nord, t. LXIII, 1931 ; réédition en 1995 par l'Office d’Édition du livre d'histoire, préface de Claude-Guy Onfray et notice biographique de l'auteur par Gilbert Guyon.
- J. Aigueperse, Boishardy, général des Chouans, éditions F. Lanore, 1977.
- Daniel de la Motte-Rouge, Boishardy, général chouan, pilier de la paix avec les généraux républicains Humbert et Hoche, article dans le Bulletin de l'association des Amis du Vieux Lamballe et du Penthièvre, 1989.
- Guy de Sallier Dupin (préface de Michel Mohrt), Boishardy, chef chouan breton, éditions de la Plomée, 2000.
- Patrick de Gmeline: Les lys refleuriront. Presses de la Cité. 1989.
- Théophile Briant, Les Amazones de la Chouannerie, Paris: éditions Sorlot, 1938, 254 p.
