= Assembly of Vizille =

1788 meeting in Grenoble, France

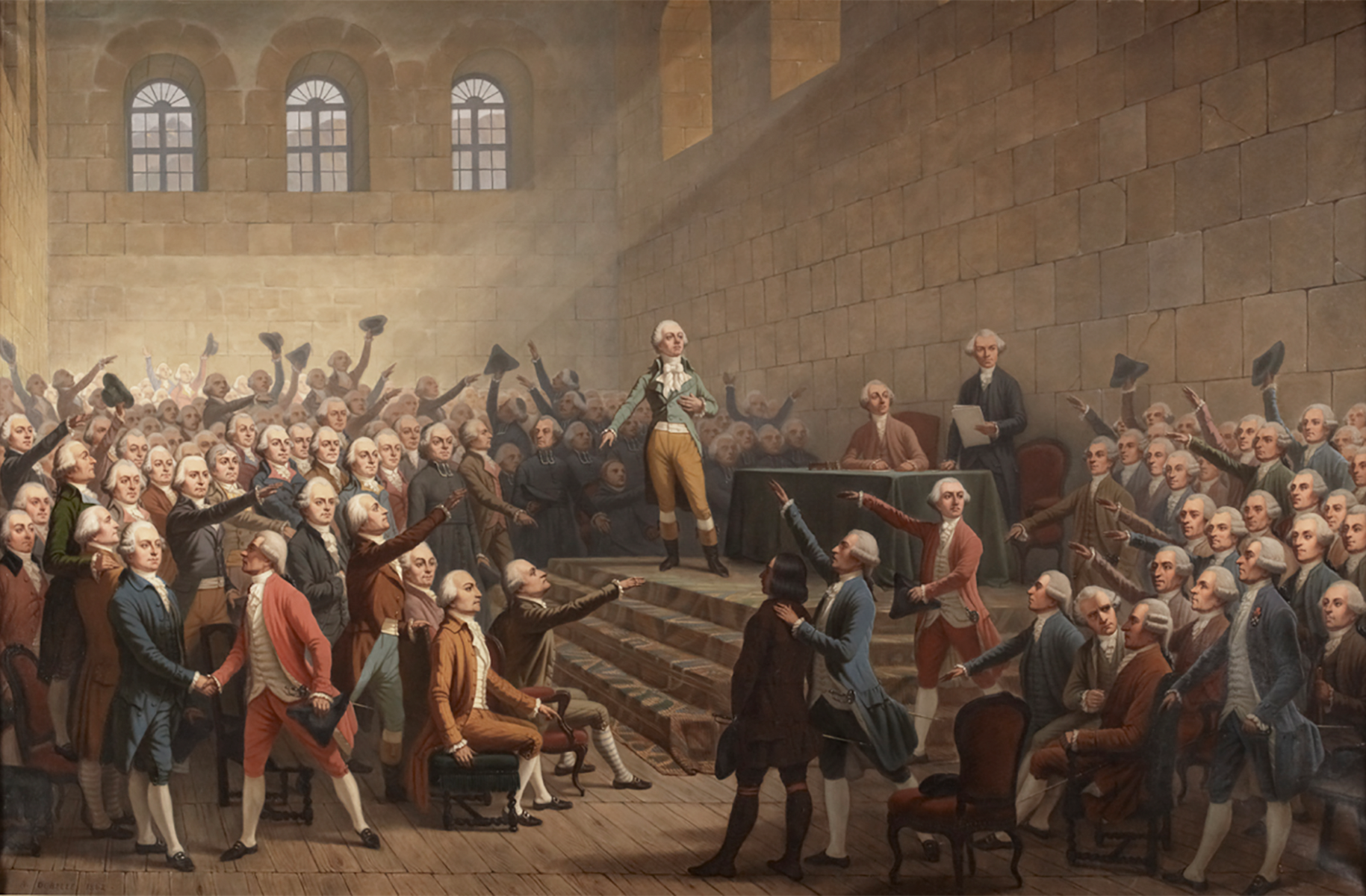
Assembly of Vizille by Alexandre Debelle, (Musée de la Révolution française).

The Assembly of Vizille (French: Assemblée de Vizille) or Estates General of Dauphiné (Réunion des états généraux du Dauphiné) was the result of a meeting of various representatives in Grenoble. Its purpose was to discuss the events of The Day of the Tiles, one of the first revolts preceding the French Revolution.

== Day of the Tiles ==
On 7 June 1788, riots broke out all over the town of Grenoble. Soldiers sent to quell the disturbances forced the townspeople off the streets. Some sources say that the soldiers were sent to disperse parliamentarians, who were attempting to assemble a parliament. However, the townspeople climbed onto the roofs of buildings, hurling roof-tiles at the soldiers in the streets below, hence the name. This drove royal troops out of the city in the first outbreak of political violence that became the revolution.

== The Assembly ==
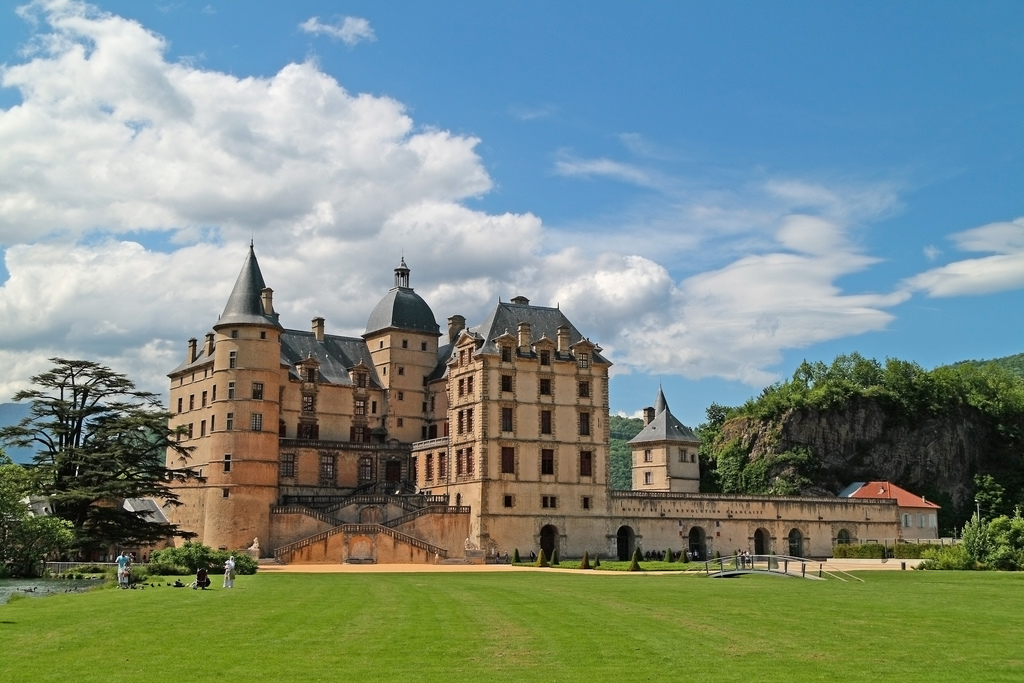
Castel of Vizille.

In July, Claude Perier, inspired by all of the liberal ideas around him, assembled a meeting in the room of the Jeu de Paume in his Chateau de Vizille and hosted the meeting which was previously prohibited in Grenoble. Almost 500 men gathered that day at the banquet hosted by Claude. In attendance there were many "notables" including churchmen, businessmen, doctors, notaries, municipal officials, lawyers, and landed nobility of the province of Dauphiné.

Demanded at this meeting: the Convocation in Paris of an Estates-General (a form of national parliament). This meeting marked the first portion of the French Revolution. Opposition to absolutist monarchy finally came out into the open, with increasing support for its demands, culminating in the meeting of the Estates General.
