= Bréhand =

Bréhand Brehant-Monkontour
- Commune
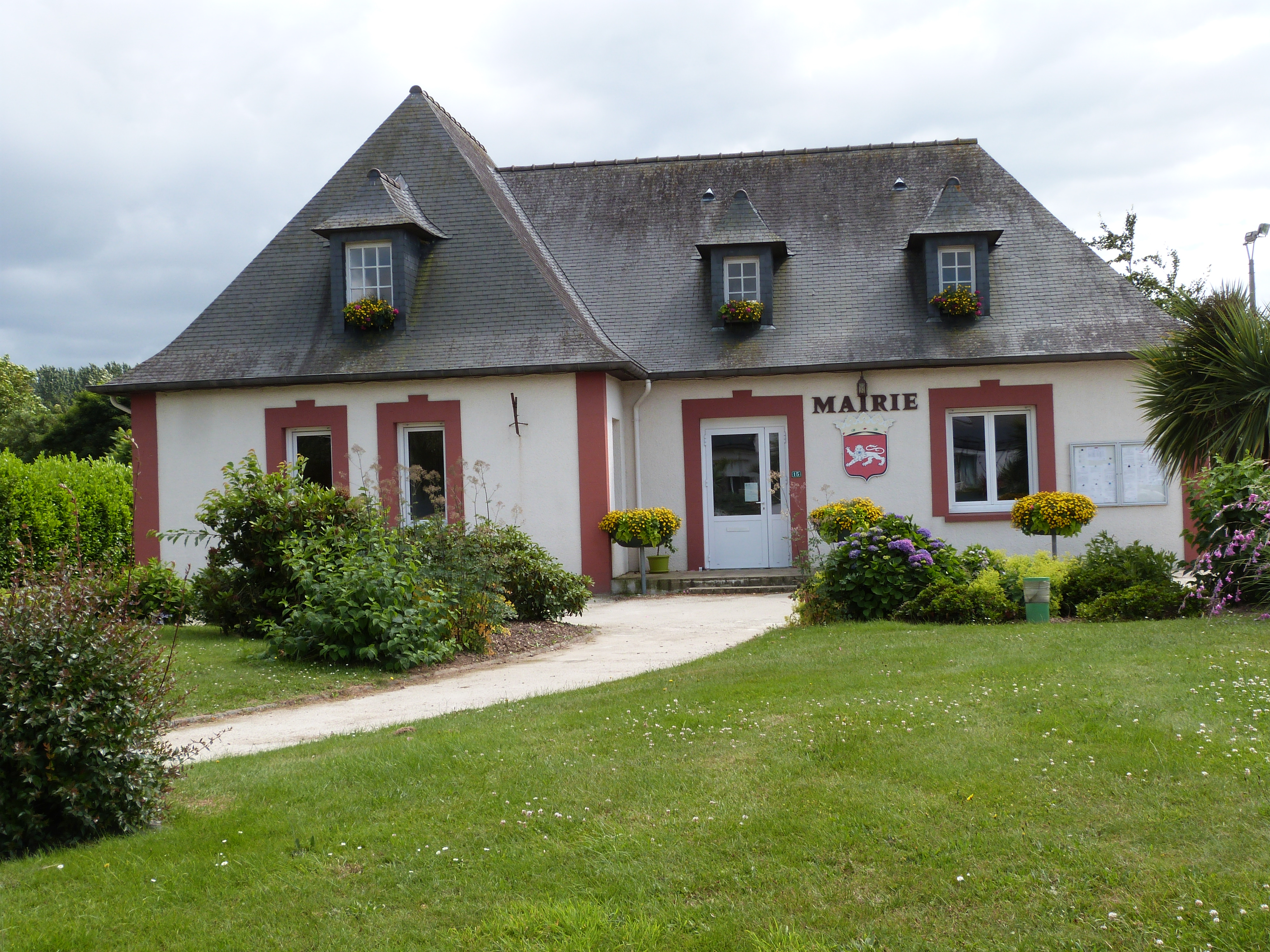
- The town hall of Bréhand

- Flag Coat of arms
- Location of Bréhand
- Location within France Location within Brittany
- Coordinates: 48°24′13″N 2°34′23″W
- Country: France
- Region: Brittany
- Department: Côtes-d'Armor
- Arrondissement: Saint-Brieuc
- Canton: Plénée-Jugon
- Intercommunality: CA Lamballe Terre et Mer

Government
  - Mayor (2020–2026): Yves Ruffet
- Area^{1}: 24.95 km^{2} (9.63 sq mi)
- Highest elevation: 150 m (490 ft)
- Lowest elevation: 58 m (190 ft)
- Population (2023): 1,684
  - Density: 67.49/km^{2} (174.8/sq mi)
- Time zone: UTC+01:00 (CET)
  - Summer (DST): UTC+02:00 (CEST)
- INSEE/Postal code: 22015 /22510
- ^{1} French Land Register data, which excludes lakes, ponds, glaciers > 1 km^{2} (0.386 sq mi or 247 acres) and river estuaries.

Bréhand (French pronunciation: [bʁeɑ̃]; Breton: Brehant-Monkontour; Gallo: Berhaund-Moncontór) is a commune in the Côtes-d'Armor department of Brittany in northwestern France.

== Population ==
Historical population
Year	Pop.	±% p.a.
1968	1,307	—
1975	1,247	−0.67%
1982	1,369	+1.34%
1990	1,287	−0.77%
1999	1,271	−0.14%
2007	1,404	+1.25%
2012	1,507	+1.43%
2017	1,647	+1.79%
2023	1,684	+0.37%
Source: INSEE

Inhabitants of Bréhand are called Bréhandais in French.

== See also ==
- Communes of the Côtes-d'Armor department
