= Galdo =

Galdo (or also Galdi), may refer to:

== Places ==
=== Italy ===
Municipalities (comuni)

- San Bartolomeo in Galdo, in the Province of Benevento
- San Giovanni in Galdo, in the Province of Campobasso

Civil parishes (frazioni)

- Galdo degli Alburni, former municipality now part of Sicignano degli Alburni (SA)
- Galdo di Carifi, in the municipality of Mercato San Severino (SA)
- Galdo, in the municipality of Campagna (SA)
- Galdo, in the municipality of Pollica (SA)
- Montegaldo, in the municipality of Lauria (PZ)
- Piazza del Galdo, in the municipality of Mercato San Severino (SA)

=== Elsewhere ===
- Galdi, Cameroon

== People ==
- Antonio Galdo, Italian journalist
- Brendan Galdo, American musician
- Vincenzo Galdi, Italian photographer
- Vincenzo Galdi (academic) (born 1970), Italian electrical engineer and academic
