= October 17 =

October 17 this year in various calendars
- Saturday, 17 October 2026
Akan	Kurumemene
Armenian	29 Sahmi 1476
Aztec	Izcalli 15, 8 Tōchtli
Babylonian	4 Tashritu, 2337 SE
Balinese pawukon	Menga, Pasah, Laba, Paing, Paniron, Saniscara of Kelawu, Indra, Nohan, Dewa
Bengali	1 Kartik, BS 1433
Chinese	Yang Wood Rat・Root Mansion; Fire Horse Year, Month 9, Day 8 (Hanlu, 6 days until Shuangjiang)
Common Era	17 October 2026 CE
Coptic	7 Paopi, AM 1743
Egyptian	4 Phamenoth, 2775 NE
Ethiopian	7 Ṭeqemt, 2019 Amätä Məhrät
French Republican	Décade III, Quintidi de Vendémiaire de l'Année 235 de la République
Gregorian	17 October, AD 2026
Hebrew	6 Cheshvan, AM 5787
Hindu	Mūla・Atigaṇḍa; Solar: 31 Āśvina, 1948 SE; Lunisolar: Saptamī, Śukla pakṣa of Āśvina, 2083 VE; Rāudra・5127 KY・1,872,865
Icelandic	Laugardagur, 24 Haustmánuður 2026
Islamic	5 Jumada al-awwal, AH 1448 (using tabular method)
ISO week date	2026-W42-6
Japanese	7 Nagatsuki, Reiwa 8 (Kanro, 6 days until Sōkō)
Julian	4 October, AD 2026 (AM 7535)
Julian day	2461331
Korean	7 Gaedal, 4359 DE
Maya	13.0.14.0.8; 1 Zac, 8 Lamat
Roman	ante diem IV Nonas Octobres, MMDCCLXXIX AUC
Solar Hijri	25 Mehr, SH 1405
Tibetan	7 tha skar, me pho rta 2153 or 1772 or 1000

<<	October					>>
Su	Mo	Tu	We	Th	Fr	Sa
				1	2	3
4	5	6	7	8	9	10
11	12	13	14	15	16	17
18	19	20	21	22	23	24
25	26	27	28	29	30	31
2026

October 17 in recent years
2026 (Saturday)
2025 (Friday)
2024 (Thursday)
2023 (Tuesday)
2022 (Monday)
2021 (Sunday)
2020 (Saturday)
2019 (Thursday)
2018 (Wednesday)
2017 (Tuesday)

October 17 is the 290th day of the year (291st in leap years) in the Gregorian calendar; 75 days remain until the end of the year.

== Events ==
=== Pre-1600 ===
- 690 – Empress Wu Zetian establishes the Zhou Dynasty of China.
- 1091 – London tornado of 1091: A tornado thought to be of strength T8/F4 strikes the heart of London.
- 1173 – English Crown forces under Richard de Lucy defeat rebels under Robert de Beaumont in the battle of Fornham.
- 1346 – The English capture King David II of Scotland at Neville's Cross and imprison him for eleven years.
- 1448 – The second Battle of Kosovo begins between Hungarian forces under John Hunyadi and Ottoman forces under Murad II.
- 1456 – The University of Greifswald is established as the second oldest university in northern Europe.
- 1534 – Anti-Catholic posters appear in Paris and other cities supporting Huldrych Zwingli's position on the Mass.
- 1558 – Poczta Polska, the Polish postal service, is founded.

=== 1601–1900 ===
- 1604 – Kepler's Supernova is observed in the constellation of Ophiuchus.
- 1610 – French king Louis XIII is crowned in Reims Cathedral.
- 1660 – The nine regicides who signed the death warrant of Charles I of England are hanged, drawn and quartered.
- 1662 – Charles II of England sells Dunkirk to Louis XIV of France for 40,000 pounds.
- 1713 – Great Northern War: Russia defeats Sweden in the Battle of Kostianvirta in Pälkäne.
- 1771 – Premiere in Milan of the opera Ascanio in Alba, composed by Mozart at age 15.
- 1777 – American Revolutionary War: British General John Burgoyne surrenders his army at Saratoga, New York.
- 1781 – American Revolutionary War: British General Charles, Earl Cornwallis surrenders at the Siege of Yorktown.
- 1797 – Treaty of Campo Formio is signed between France and Austria, ending the War of the First Coalition.
- 1800 – War of the Second Coalition: Britain takes control of the Dutch colony of Curaçao.
- 1806 – Former leader of the Haitian Revolution, Emperor Jacques I, is assassinated after an oppressive rule.
- 1811 – The silver deposits of Agua Amarga are discovered in Chile becoming in the following years instrumental for the Patriots to finance the Chilean War of Independence.
- 1814 – Eight people die in the London Beer Flood.
- 1850 – Riots start, which lead to a massacre in Aleppo.
- 1860 – First The Open Championship (referred to in North America as the British Open).
- 1861 – Aboriginal Australians kill nineteen Europeans in the Cullin-la-ringo massacre.

=== 1901–1999 ===
- 1907 – Marconi begins the first commercial transatlantic wireless service.
- 1912 – Bulgaria, Greece and Serbia declare war on the Ottoman Empire, joining Montenegro in the First Balkan War.
- 1919 – Leeds United F.C. founded at Salem Chapel, Holbeck after the winding up of Leeds City F.C. for making illegal payments to players during World War I
- 1931 – Al Capone is convicted of income tax evasion.
- 1933 – Albert Einstein flees Nazi Germany and moves to the United States.
- 1940 – The body of Communist propagandist Willi Münzenberg is found in South France, starting a never-resolved mystery.
- 1941 – World War II: The USS Kearny becomes the first U.S. Navy vessel to be torpedoed by a U-boat.
- 1943 – The Burma Railway (Burma–Thailand Railway) is completed.
- 1943 – Nazi Holocaust in Poland: Sobibór extermination camp is closed.
- 1945 – A large demonstration in Buenos Aires, Argentina, demands Juan Perón's release.
- 1952 – Indonesian Army elements surrounded the Merdeka Palace demanding President Sukarno disband the Provisional People's Representative Council.
- 1956 – The first commercial nuclear power station is officially opened by Queen Elizabeth II in Sellafield, England.
- 1961 – Directed by their chief Maurice Papon, Paris police massacre scores of Algerian protesters.
- 1961 – The first attempt of the apartheid analogy by Ahmad Shukeiri.
- 1965 – The 1964–65 New York World's Fair closes after two years and more than 51 million attendees.
- 1966 – The 23rd Street Fire in New York City kills 12 firefighters.
- 1969 – The Caravaggio painting Nativity with St. Francis and St. Lawrence is stolen from the Oratory of Saint Lawrence in Palermo.
- 1970 – FLQ terrorists murder Quebec Vice-Premier and Minister of Labour Pierre Laporte.
- 1973 – OPEC imposes an oil embargo against countries they deem to have helped Israel in the Yom Kippur War.
- 1975 – 'Salem's Lot, an American vampire novel by Stephen King, is published.
- 1977 – The hijacked Lufthansa Flight 181 lands in Mogadishu. The remaining hostages are later rescued.
- 1979 – Mother Teresa is awarded the Nobel Peace Prize.
- 1979 – The Department of Education Organization Act creates the U.S. Department of Education.
- 1980 – As part of the Holy See–United Kingdom relations a British monarch makes the first state visit to the Vatican.
- 1988 – Uganda Airlines Flight 775 crashes at Rome–Fiumicino International Airport, in Rome, Italy, killing 33 people.
- 1989 – The 6.9 M_{w} Loma Prieta earthquake shakes the San Francisco Bay Area and the Central Coast, killing 63.
- 1989 – The East German Politburo votes to remove Erich Honecker from his role as General Secretary.
- 1991 – Rudrapur bombings by Sikh separatists, who explode two bombs, during a Ramlila Hindu celebration in Rudrapur, Uttarakhand, killing 41 people.
- 1992 – Having gone to the wrong house, Japanese student Yoshihiro Hattori is killed by the homeowner in Baton Rouge, Louisiana.
- 1994 – Russian journalist Dmitry Kholodov is assassinated while investigating corruption in the armed forces.

=== 2000–present ===
- 2000 – The Hatfield rail crash leads to the collapse of Railtrack.
- 2001 – Israeli tourism minister Rehavam Ze'evi is assassinated by Hamdi Quran, a member of the PFLP, thus becoming the highest-ranking Israeli to be killed by a Palestinian.
- 2004 – A fire that lasted over 15 hours destroyed almost one third of the East Tower of the Parque Central Urban Complex in Caracas, Venezuela.
- 2017 – Syrian civil war: The Syrian Democratic Forces (SDF) capture the last foothold of the Islamic State of Iraq and the Levant (ISIL) in Raqqa, marking the end of the Battle of Raqqa.
- 2018 – The recreational use of cannabis is legalized in Canada.
- 2018 – A mass shooting and bombing at Kerch Polytechnic College in Crimea kills 21 people including the attacker and injures 70 others.
- 2019 – Drug dealers in Culiacan, Sinaloa, Mexico force the government to back down on an arrest.
- 2019 – The 17 October Revolution starts in Lebanon.
- 2023 – An explosion at Al-Ahli Arab Hospital in Gaza kills hundreds of Palestinians during the Gaza war.

== Births ==
=== Pre-1600 ===
- 503 – Lý Nam Đế, first emperor of Vietnam (died 548)
- 1253 – Ivo of Kermartin, French priest and saint (died 1303)
- 1493 – Bartolommeo Bandinelli, Italian sculptor (died 1560)
- 1500 – Alonso de Orozco Mena, Spanish Roman Catholic priest (died 1591)
- 1538 – Irene di Spilimbergo, Italian Renaissance poet and painter (died 1559)
- 1577 – Cristofano Allori, Italian painter (died 1621)
- 1577 – Dmitry Pozharsky, Russian prince (died 1642)
- 1582 – Johann Gerhard, German theologian and academic (died 1637)
- 1587 – Nathan Field, English dramatist and actor (died 1620)

=== 1601–1900 ===
- 1623 – Francis Turretin, Swiss-Italian minister, theologian, and academic (died 1687)
- 1629 – Balthasar Charles, Prince of Asturias (died 1646)
- 1688 – Domenico Zipoli, Italian missionary and composer (died 1726)
- 1711 – Jupiter Hammon, American poet (died 1806)
- 1719 – Jacques Cazotte, French author and academic (died 1792)
- 1720 – Maria Teresa Agnesi Pinottini, Italian harpsichord player and composer (died 1795)
- 1725 – John Wilkes, English journalist and politician (died 1797)
- 1729 – Pierre-Alexandre Monsigny, French composer and academic (died 1817)
- 1735 – Franz Xaver Feuchtmayer the Younger, German Baroque artist (died 1803)
- 1759 – Andrey Voronikhin, Russian architect and painter (died 1814)
- 1760 – Claude Henri de Rouvroy, comte de Saint-Simon, French economist and philosopher (died 1825)
- 1768 – Sophie von Dönhoff, morganatic spouse by bigamy to King Frederick William II of Prussia (died 1838)
- 1779 – Louis Charles, French prince of the blood (died 1808)
- 1779 – José Andrés Pacheco de Melo, Argentine statesman and priest (died approx. 1820)
- 1780 – Richard Mentor Johnson, American politician, ninth Vice President of the United States (died 1850)
- 1781 – Johann Friedrich Meckel, German anatomist (died 1833)
- 1784 – Fructuoso Rivera, first president of Uruguay (died 1854)
- 1785 – Christen Smith, Norwegian scientist (died 1816)
- 1792 – John Bowring, English polyglot and governor of Hong Kong (died 1826)
- 1797 – Juan Lavalle, Argentine politician (died 1841)
- 1803 – Ferenc Deák, Hungarian politician (died 1876)
- 1810 – Adolphe-Félix Cals, French painter (died 1880)
- 1811 – Albertus van Raalte, Dutch-American pastor and educator (died 1876)
- 1813 – Georg Büchner, German-Swiss poet and playwright (died 1837)
- 1814 – Yakiv Holovatsky, Ukrainian historian, scholar, and poet (died 1888)
- 1817 – Syed Ahmad Khan, Indian philosopher and scholar (died 1898)
- 1821 – Alexander Gardner, Scottish photographer (died 1882)
- 1828 – Aureliano Maestre de San Juan, Spanish scientist (died 1890)
- 1833 – Paul Bert, French zoologist, physiologist, and pioneer of aerospace medicine who studied the effects of air pressure on the body (died 1886)
- 1833 – José E. Días, Paraguayan general (died 1867)
- 1835 – Louis-Léon Cugnot, French sculptor (died 1894)
- 1835 – Paul Haenlein, German mechanical engineer (died 1905)
- 1840 – André Gill, French caricaturist (died 1885)
- 1844 – Gustave Schlumberger, French historian (died 1929)
- 1845 – John J. Gardner, American politician (died 1921)
- 1853 – Grand Duchess Maria Alexandrovna of Russia (died 1920)
- 1859 – Childe Hassam, American painter and illustrator (died 1935)
- 1860 – Henry Campbell Black, founder of Black's Law Dictionary (died 1927)
- 1864 – Elinor Glyn, English author, screenwriter, and producer (died 1943)
- 1865 – James Rudolph Garfield, American lawyer and politician, 23rd United States Secretary of the Interior (died 1950)
- 1867 – Josep Puig i Cadafalch, Catalan architect who designed the Casa Martí (died 1956)
- 1869 – Bhaskarbuwa Bakhale, Hindustani classical vocalist
- 1871 – Segundo de Chomón, Spanish cinematographer, director, and screenwriter (died 1929)
- 1876 – Hippolyte Aucouturier, French road cyclist (died 1944)
- 1878 – Jacobo Fitz-James Stuart, Spanish politician and 17th Duke of Alba (died 1953)
- 1880 – Jesús Reyes Ferreira, Mexican artist and art collector (died 1977)
- 1881 – Maria Dulęba, Polish actress (died 1959)
- 1882 – Haritina Korotkevich, Russian war heroine (died 1904)
- 1883 – Alexander Neill, Scottish educator (died 1973)
- 1883 – Thaddeus Shideler, American hurdler (died 1966)
- 1884 – James Floyd Smith, American aviator and inventor of the modern parachute (died 1956)
- 1886 – Spring Byington, American actress (died 1971)
- 1889 – Mikha'il Na'ima, Lebanese author (died 1988)
- 1890 – Roy Kilner, English cricketer (died 1928)
- 1892 – Theodor Eicke, German SS general (died 1943)
- 1892 – Herbert Howells, English organist, composer, and educator (died 1983)
- 1893 – Raffaele Bendandi, Italian clockmaker and seismologist (died 1979)
- 1894 – Prince René, Italian Prince of Denmark (died 1962)
- 1894 – Pablo de Rokha, Chilean poet (died 1968)
- 1895 – Miguel Ydígoras Fuentes, President of Guatemala (1958–1963) (died 1982)
- 1895 – Doris Humphrey, American dancer and choreographer (died 1958)
- 1896 – Roman Petrovich, Russian prince (died 1978)
- 1898 – Shinichi Suzuki, Japanese violinist and educator (died 1998)
- 1898 – Eileen Sedgwick, American actress (died 1991)
- 1898 – Simon Vestdijk, Dutch author and poet (died 1971)
- 1900 – C. C. van Asch van Wijck, Dutch artist and sculptor (died 1932)
- 1900 – Jean Arthur, American actress (died 1991)
- 1900 – Yvor Winters, American critic and poet (died 1968)

=== 1901–present ===
- 1901 – Emma Gamboa Alvarado, Costa Rican educator (died 1973)
- 1902 – Irene Ryan, American actress (died 1973)
- 1903 – Andrei Grechko, Soviet general (died 1976)
- 1903 – Nathanael West, American author and screenwriter (died 1940)
- 1905 – Leopoldo Benites, Ecuadorian diplomat 28th president of the United Nations General Assembly (died 1996)
- 1906 – Paul Derringer, American baseball player (died 1987)
- 1906 – Andrey Tikhonov, Soviet mathematician (died 1993)
- 1907 – John Marley, American actor (died 1984)
- 1908 – Kenji Miyamoto, Japanese politician (died 2007)
- 1908 – Hjördis Petterson, Swedish actress (died 1988)
- 1908 – Wally Prigg, Australian rugby league player (died 1980)
- 1908 – Red Rolfe, American baseball player, coach, and manager (died 1969)
- 1909 – Cozy Cole, American drummer (died 1981)
- 1909 – Leopoldo Panero, Spanish poet (died 1962)
- 1909 – Joaquín Satrústegui, Spanish lawyer and politician (died 1992)
- 1910 – Marina Núñez del Prado, Bolivian sculptor (died 1995)
- 1910 – Ester Wier, American author (died 2000)
- 1912 – Pope John Paul I (died 1978)
- 1912 – Theodore Marier, American composer and educator, founded the Boston Archdiocesan Choir School (died 2001)
- 1912 – Jack Owens, American singer-songwriter and pianist (died 1982)
- 1913 – Robert Lowery, American actor (died 1971)
- 1913 – Marian Marsh, Trinidadian-American actress and environmentalist (died 2006)
- 1913 – Faik Türün, Turkish general (died 2003)
- 1914 – Jerry Siegel, American author and illustrator (died 1996)
- 1915 – Arthur Miller, American playwright and screenwriter (died 2005)
- 1916 – José López Rega, Argentinean politician (died 1989)
- 1917 – Alfred Benlloch Llorach, Spanish inventor (died 2013)
- 1917 – Martin Donnelly, New Zealand cricketer (died 1999)
- 1917 – Marsha Hunt, American actress and singer (died 2022)
- 1917 – Aimo Koivunen, Finnish soldier and corporal (died 1989)
- 1917 – Norman Leyden, American composer and conductor (died 2014)
- 1917 – Sumner Locke Elliott, Australian-American author and playwright (died 1991)
- 1917 – Adele Stimmel Chase, American painter and sculptor (died 2000)
- 1918 – Rita Hayworth, American actress, singer and dancer (died 1987)
- 1918 – Luis Alberto Solari, Uruguayan artist (died 1993)
- 1918 – Ralph Wilson, American businessman, founded the Buffalo Bills (died 2014)
- 1919 – Isaak Khalatnikov, Ukrainian-Russian theoretical physicist and academic (died 2021)
- 1919 – Violet Milstead, Canadian World War II aviator and bush pilot (died 2014)
- 1919 – Zhao Ziyang, Chinese politician (died 2005)
- 1920 – Montgomery Clift, American actor (died 1966)
- 1920 – Miguel Delibes, Spanish journalist and author (died 2010)
- 1920 – Zully Moreno, Argentine actress (died 1999)
- 1921 – Priscilla Buckley, American journalist and author (died 2012)
- 1921 – Maria Gorokhovskaya, Russian-Israeli gymnast (died 2001)
- 1921 – George Mackay Brown, Scottish author, poet, and playwright (died 1996)
- 1921 – Tom Poston, American actor and comedian (died 2007)
- 1922 – Luiz Bonfá, Brazilian guitarist and composer (died 2001)
- 1922 – Pierre Juneau, Canadian broadcaster and politician, co-founded the Montreal World Film Festival (died 2012)
- 1923 – Barney Kessel, American guitarist and composer (died 2004)
- 1923 – Charles McClendon, American football player and coach (died 2001)
- 1924 – Don Coryell, American football player and coach (died 2010)
- 1924 – Anton Geiser, Croatian SS officer (died 2012)
- 1924 – Giacomo Mari, Italian footballer (died 1991)
- 1924 – Rolando Panerai, Italian baritone (died 2019)
- 1925 – Harry Carpenter, English sportscaster (died 2010)
- 1926 – Julie Adams, American actress (died 2019)
- 1926 – Beverly Garland, American actress (died 2008)
- 1926 – Roberto Lippi, Italian race car driver (died 2011)
- 1928 – Jimmy Breslin, American investigative journalist, Pulitzer Prize-winning columnist and novelist (died 2017)
- 1928 – Santiago Stevenson, Panamanian singer and minister (died 2007)
- 1928 – Alejandro Végh Villegas, Uruguayan politician (died 2017)
- 1929 – Mário Wilson, Mozambican footballer and manager (died 2016)
- 1930 – Ismail Akbay, Turkish physicist and engineer (died 2003)
- 1930 – Robert Atkins, American physician and cardiologist, created the Atkins diet (died 2003)
- 1931 – José Alencar, Brazilian businessman and politician (died 2011)
- 1932 – Paul Anderson, American weightlifter (died 1994)
- 1931 – Ernst Hinterberger, Austrian author and playwright (died 2012)
- 1931 – Anatoly Pristavkin, Russian writer (died 2008)
- 1933 – William Anders, Hong Kong-American general and astronaut (died 2024)
- 1933 – The Singing Nun, Belgian singer-songwriter, guitarist, and nun (died 1985)
- 1934 – Alan Garner, English author and playwright
- 1934 – Johnny Haynes, English-Scottish footballer (died 2005)
- 1934 – Rico Rodriguez, Jamaican trombonist (died 2015)
- 1935 – Sydney Chapman, English architect and politician, Vice-Chamberlain of the Household (died 2014)
- 1935 – Michael Eavis, English farmer, founded the Glastonbury Festival
- 1935 – Carlos Pairetti, Argentine racing driver (died 2022)
- 1936 – Sathima Bea Benjamin, South African singer-songwriter (died 2013)
- 1936 – Hiroo Kanamori, Japanese-American seismologist and academic
- 1936 – Santiago Navarro, Spanish basketball player (died 1993)
- 1936 – Bert Nievera, Filipino-American singer (died 2018)
- 1937 – José María Álvarez del Manzano, Spanish politician
- 1937 – Aida Navarro, Venezuelan mezzo-soprano
- 1937 – Renato Prada Oropeza, Bolivian-Mexican scientist (died 2011)
- 1937 – Paxton Whitehead, English actor (died 2023)
- 1938 – António Calvário, Portuguese singer and artist
- 1938 – Evel Knievel, American motorcycle rider and stuntman (died 2007)
- 1938 – Les Murray, Australian anthologist, poet, and critic (died 2019)
- 1939 – Oliver Rackham, English botanist and academic (died 2015)
- 1940 – Stephen Kovacevich, American pianist and conductor (died 2026)
- 1940 – Jim Smith, English footballer and manager (died 2019)
- 1940 – Peter Stringfellow, English businessman (died 2018)
- 1941 – Earl Thomas Conley, American country singer-songwriter and guitarist (died 2019)
- 1941 – Paul Ellison, American musician
- 1941 – Jim Seals, American singer-songwriter, guitarist, and violinist (died 2022)
- 1942 – Steve Jones, American basketball player and sportscaster (died 2017)
- 1942 – Gary Puckett, American pop singer-songwriter and guitarist
- 1943 – Ignacio Rupérez, Spanish diplomat and journalist (died 2015)
- 1944 – Ángel Cristo, Spanish circus performer (died 2010)
- 1946 – Ronni Chasen, American publicist (died 2010)
- 1946 – Michael Hossack, American drummer (died 2012)
- 1946 – Manuel "Flaco" Ibáñez, Mexican actor and comedian
- 1946 – Akira Kushida, Japanese vocalist
- 1946 – Cameron Mackintosh, English producer and manager
- 1946 – Adam Michnik, Polish journalist and historian
- 1946 – Julio Miranda, Argentine politician (died 2021)
- 1946 – Drusilla Modjeska, English-Australian author and critic
- 1946 – Daniela Payssé, Uruguayan politician (died 2018)
- 1946 – José Perramón, Spanish handball player
- 1946 – Jaime Ravinet, Chilean politician
- 1946 – Bob Seagren, American pole vaulter
- 1946 – Rüdiger Wittig, German geobotanist and ecologist
- 1947 – Omar Azziman, adviser to the King of Morocco
- 1947 – Gene Green, American lawyer and politician
- 1947 – Michael McKean, American singer-songwriter, actor, and director
- 1947 – Robert Post, American educator and academic
- 1948 – Osvaldo Castro, Chilean footballer
- 1948 – Robert Jordan, American soldier and author (died 2007)
- 1948 – Margot Kidder, Canadian-American actress (died 2018)
- 1948 – George Wendt, American actor and comedian (died 2025)
- 1949 – Owen Arthur, Barbadian economist and politician, 5th Prime Minister of Barbados (died 2020)
- 1949 – Bill Hudson, American musician and actor
- 1950 – Philippe Barbarin, French cardinal
- 1950 – Wally Lamb, American novelist
- 1950 – Sandra Reemer, Indo-Dutch singer (died 2017)
- 1950 – Howard Rollins, American actor (died 1996)
- 1951 – Dirk Beheydt, Belgian footballer
- 1951 – Annie Borckink, Dutch speed skater
- 1951 – Roger Pontare, Swedish singer
- 1951 – Shari Ulrich, American-Canadian singer-songwriter and violinist
- 1953 – Joseph Bowie, American trombonist and bandleader
- 1953 – Domenico Penzo, Italian footballer
- 1954 – Carlos Buhler, American mountaineer
- 1955 – Georgios Alogoskoufis, Greek economist, academic, and politician, Greek Minister of Finance
- 1955 – Mike Bratz, American basketball player
- 1956 – Fran Cosmo, American singer-songwriter and guitarist
- 1956 – Mae Jemison, American physician, academic, and astronaut
- 1956 – Pat McCrory, American businessman and politician, 74th Governor of North Carolina
- 1956 – Ken Morrow, American ice hockey player and executive
- 1956 – Stephen Palumbi, American academic and author
- 1957 – Eleftheria Arvanitaki, Greek folk singer
- 1957 – Nelson Barrera, Mexican baseball player (died 2002)
- 1957 – Lawrence Bender, American actor and producer
- 1957 – Antonio Galdo, Italian journalist
- 1957 – Steve McMichael, American football player, wrestler, and sportscaster (died 2025)
- 1957 – Pino Palladino, Welsh bassist
- 1957 – Vincent Van Patten, American tennis player and actor
- 1958 – Howard Alden, American guitarist
- 1958 – Alan Jackson, American singer-songwriter
- 1958 – Sandra Mozarowsky, Spanish actress (died 1977)
- 1958 – Craig Murray, British diplomat
- 1959 – Mustafa Aberchán, Spanish politician
- 1959 – Ron Drummond, American author and scholar
- 1959 – Francisco Flores Pérez, Salvadorian politician, President of El Salvador (died 2016)
- 1959 – Russell Gilbert, Australian comedian, actor, and screenwriter
- 1959 – Eugenio Hernández Flores, Mexican politician
- 1959 – Norm Macdonald, Canadian actor, comedian, producer, and screenwriter (died 2021)
- 1959 – Mark Peel, Australian historian and academic
- 1959 – Richard Roeper, American journalist and critic
- 1960 – Guy Henry, English actor
- 1960 – Rob Marshall, American director, producer, and choreographer
- 1960 – Bernie Nolan, Irish singer (died 2013)
- 1960 – Philippe Sands, American lawyer and academic
- 1961 – David Means, American short story writer
- 1962 – Glenn Braggs, American baseball player
- 1962 – Jay Humphries, American basketball player
- 1962 – Mike Judge, American animator, director, screenwriter, producer and actor
- 1963 – Sergio Goycochea, Argentinian footballer and journalist
- 1963 – Toby Young, English journalist and academic
- 1964 – Margarita Liborio Arrazola, Mexican politician
- 1964 – Gregg Wallace, English television presenter
- 1965 – Aravinda de Silva, Sri Lankan cricketer
- 1965 – Rhys Muldoon, Australian actor
- 1966 – Shaun Edwards, English rugby player and coach
- 1966 – Danny Ferry, American basketball player and manager
- 1966 – Mark Gatiss, English actor, screenwriter and novelist
- 1966 – Tommy Kendall, American race car driver and sportscaster
- 1967 – René Dif, Danish musician
- 1967 – Pedro González Vera, Chilean footballer
- 1967 – Simon Segars, English businessman
- 1967 – Nathalie Tauziat, French tennis player
- 1968 – Alejandra Ávalos, Mexican artist
- 1968 – Graeme Le Saux, English footballer and sportscaster
- 1968 – Ziggy Marley, Jamaican singer-songwriter, guitarist, and voice actor
- 1968 – David Robertson, Scottish footballer and manager
- 1969 – Ernie Els, South African golfer and sportscaster
- 1969 – Jesús Ángel García, Spanish racewalker
- 1969 – Wood Harris, American actor
- 1969 – Wyclef Jean, Haitian-American rapper, producer, and actor
- 1969 – Rick Mercer, Canadian comedian, actor, producer, and screenwriter
- 1970 – Anil Kumble, Indian cricketer
- 1970 – John Mabry, American baseball player, coach, and sportscaster
- 1970 – J. C. MacKenzie, Canadian actor
- 1971 – Chris Kirkpatrick, American singer-songwriter and dancer
- 1971 – Kim Ljung, Norwegian singer-songwriter and bass player
- 1971 – Martin Heinrich, American politician
- 1971 – Derrick Plourde, American drummer (died 2005)
- 1971 – Blues Saraceno, American guitarist, songwriter, and producer
- 1972 – Eminem, American rapper, producer, and actor
- 1972 – Sharon Leal, American actress
- 1972 – Musashi, Japanese karateka and kickboxer
- 1972 – Tarkan, German-Turkish singer
- 1973 – Rubén Garcés, Panamanian basketball player
- 1973 – Andrea Tarozzi, Italian footballer and coach
- 1973 – Bhagwant Mann, Indian Politician
- 1974 – Ariel Levy, American journalist and author
- 1974 – Matthew Macfadyen, English actor
- 1974 – Obdulio Ávila Mayo, Mexican politician
- 1974 – Bárbara Paz, Brazilian actress
- 1974 – Janne Puurtinen, Finnish keyboard player
- 1974 – John Rocker, American baseball player
- 1974 – Darío Sala, Argentine footballer
- 1974 – Gabriel Silberstein, Chilean tennis player
- 1974 – Dhondup Wangchen, Chinese director and producer
- 1975 – Jericó Abramo Masso, Mexican politician
- 1975 – Francis Bouillon, American-Canadian ice hockey player
- 1975 – Vina Morales, Filipino actress and singer
- 1976 – Sebastián Abreu, Uruguayan footballer
- 1976 – Seth Etherton, American baseball player
- 1976 – Carlos Loret de Mola, Mexican journalist
- 1976 – Kevin Maher, English-Irish footballer and coach
- 1977 – Dudu Aouate, Israeli footballer
- 1977 – Alimi Ballard, American actor and producer
- 1977 – Bryan Bertino, American actor, director, producer, and screenwriter
- 1977 – Walter Calderón, Ecuadorian footballer
- 1977 – Marko Antonio Cortés Mendoza, Mexican politician
- 1977 – Ryan McGinley, American photographer
- 1977 – André Villas-Boas, Portuguese footballer and manager
- 1978 – Jerry Flannery, Irish rugby player and coach
- 1978 – Pablo Iglesias Turrión, Spanish politician
- 1978 – Erin Karpluk, Canadian actress
- 1978 – Chuka Umunna, English lawyer and politician
- 1979 – Marcela Bovio, Mexican singer-songwriter and violinist
- 1979 – Alexandros Nikolaidis, Greek martial artist (died 2022)
- 1979 – Kimi Räikkönen, Finnish race car driver
- 1979 – Kostas Tsartsaris, Greek basketball player
- 1980 – Yekaterina Gamova, Russian volleyball player
- 1980 – Mohammad Hafeez, Pakistani cricketer
- 1980 – Isaac Mina, Ecuadorian footballer
- 1980 – Angel Parker, American actress
- 1980 – Alessandro Piccolo, Italian race car driver
- 1980 – Justin Shenkarow, American actor
- 1981 – Horacio Cervantes, Mexican footballer
- 1981 – Kurumi Enomoto, Japanese singer-songwriter
- 1981 – Holly Holm, American mixed martial artist
- 1981 – Tsubasa Imai, Japanese singer, actor, and dancer
- 1981 – Ben Rothwell, American mixed-martial artist
- 1982 – Rubén Ramírez, Argentine footballer
- 1982 – Nick Riewoldt, Australian footballer
- 1982 – Marion Rolland, French skier
- 1983 – Michelle Ang, New Zealand actress
- 1983 – Milica Brozovic, Serbian-Russian figure skater
- 1983 – Felicity Jones, English actress
- 1983 – Toshihiro Matsushita, Japanese footballer
- 1983 – Riki Miura, Japanese actor
- 1983 – Junichi Miyashita, Japanese swimmer
- 1983 – Ivan Saenko, Russian footballer
- 1983 – Mitch Talbot, American baseball player
- 1983 – Vitali Teleš, Estonian footballer
- 1984 – Sami Lepistö, Finnish ice hockey player
- 1984 – Chris Lowell, American actor
- 1984 – Giovanni Marchese, Italian footballer
- 1984 – Randall Munroe, American author and illustrator
- 1984 – Luke Rockhold, American mixed martial artist
- 1984 – Anja Eline Skybakmoen, Norwegian singer-songwriter and bandleader
- 1984 – Gottfrid Svartholm, Swedish computer specialist
- 1984 – Jared Tallent, Australian race walker
- 1985 – Carlos González, Venezuelan baseball player
- 1985 – Max Irons, English-Irish actor
- 1985 – Collins John, Dutch footballer
- 1985 – Tomokazu Nagira, Japanese footballer
- 1986 – Alexandre Bonnet, French footballer
- 1986 – Antoni Bou, Spanish motorcyclist
- 1986 – Aija Brumermane, Latvian basketball player
- 1986 – Constant Djakpa, Ivorian footballer
- 1986 – Yannick Ponsero, French figure skater
- 1986 – Nicolás Richotti, Argentine basketball player
- 1987 – Bea Alonzo, Filipino actress and singer
- 1987 – Jarosław Fojut, Polish footballer
- 1987 – Elliot Grandin, French footballer
- 1987 – Hideto Takahashi, Japanese footballer
- 1988 – Sergiy Gladyr, Ukrainian basketball player
- 1988 – Tori Matsuzaka, Japanese actor and model
- 1988 – Marina Salas, Spanish actress
- 1989 – Débora García, Spanish footballer
- 1989 – Oleksandr Isakov, Ukrainian swimmer
- 1989 – Sophie Luck, Australian actress
- 1989 – Charles Oliveira, Brazilian mixed martial artist
- 1989 – David Timor, Spanish footballer
- 1990 – Paolo Campinoti, Italian footballer
- 1990 – Maica García Godoy, Spanish water polo player
- 1990 – Ronald González Tabilo, Chilean footballer
- 1990 – Saki Kumagai, Japanese footballer
- 1990 – Patrick Lambie, South African rugby player
- 1991 – Brenda Asnicar, Argentine actress
- 1992 – Jacob Artist, American actor, singer, and dancer
- 1992 – Sam Concepcion, Filipino musician and dancer
- 1992 – Anthony Gill, American basketball player
- 1992 – Keerthy Suresh, Indian actress
- 1993 – Kenneth Omeruo, Nigerian footballer
- 1993 – Vincent Poirier, French basketball player
- 1995 – Jamal Adams, American football player
- 1995 – Ha-seong Kim, South Korean baseball player
- 1996 – Jake DeBrusk, Canadian ice hockey player
- 1997 – Robert Williams III, American basketball player
- 2001 – Thomas Strudwick, British motorcycle road racer
- 2002 – Matthew Knies, American professional ice hockey player
- 2002 – Lily, Australian-South Korean singer

== Deaths ==
=== Pre-1600 ===
- AD 33 – Agrippina the Elder, Roman wife of Germanicus (born 14 BC)
- 532 – Pope Boniface II
- 866 – Al-Musta'in, Abbasid caliph (born 836)
- 1271 – Steinvör Sighvatsdóttir, Icelandic aristocrat and poet
- 1277 – Beatrice of Falkenburg, German queen consort (born c. 1254)
- 1346 – John Randolph, 3rd Earl of Moray
- 1346 – Maurice de Moravia, Earl of Strathearn
- 1456 – Nicolas Grenon, French composer (born 1375)
- 1485 – John Scott of Scott's Hall, Warden of the Cinque Ports
- 1528 – Hernando Alonso, Spanish conquistador, first Jew executed in the New World
- 1529 – Krishnadevaraya, Emperor of Vijayanagara (born 1471)
- 1552 – Andreas Osiander, German Protestant theologian (born 1498)
- 1575 – Gaspar Cervantes de Gaeta, Spanish cardinal (born 1511)
- 1586 – Philip Sidney, English courtier, poet, and general (born 1554)
- 1587 – Francesco I de' Medici, Grand Duke of Tuscany (born 1541)

=== 1601–1900 ===
- 1616 – John Pitts, English priest and scholar (born 1560)
- 1660 – Adrian Scrope, English colonel and politician (born 1601)
- 1673 – Thomas Clifford, 1st Baron Clifford of Chudleigh, English politician, Lord High Treasurer of England (born 1630)
- 1690 – Margaret Mary Alacoque, French mystic (born 1647)
- 1696 – Geoffrey Shakerley (1619–1696), English politician (born 1619)
- 1757 – René Antoine Ferchault de Réaumur, French entomologist and academic (born 1683)
- 1776 – Pierre François le Courayer, French-English theologian and author (born 1681)
- 1780 – William Cookworthy, English pharmacist and minister (born 1705)
- 1781 – Edward Hawke, 1st Baron Hawke, English admiral (born 1705)
- 1786 – Johann Ludwig Aberli, Swiss painter and illustrator (born 1723)
- 1806 – Jean-Jacques Dessalines, Haitian commander and politician, Governor-General of Haiti (born 1758)
- 1836 – Orest Kiprensky, Russian painter (born 1782)
- 1837 – Johann Nepomuk Hummel, Austrian pianist and composer (born 1778)
- 1849 – Frédéric Chopin, Polish pianist and composer (born 1810)
- 1868 – Laura Secord, Canadian war heroine (born 1775)
- 1887 – Gustav Kirchhoff, German physicist and chemist (born 1824)
- 1889 – Nikolay Chernyshevsky, Russian philosopher and critic (born 1828)
- 1893 – Patrice de MacMahon, Duke of Magenta, French general and politician, 3rd President of France (born 1808)

=== 1901–present ===
- 1910 – Julia Ward Howe, American poet and songwriter (born 1819)
- 1910 - Kurd Lasswitz, author and physician (born 1848)
- 1918 – Malak Hifni Nasif, Egyptian poet and author (born 1886)
- 1920 – Michael Fitzgerald (Irish republican) died on Hunger Strike (born 1881)
- 1928 – Frank Dicksee, English painter and illustrator (born 1853)
- 1931 – Alfons Maria Jakob, German neurologist and academic (born 1884)
- 1937 – J. Bruce Ismay, English businessman (born 1862)
- 1938 – Karl Kautsky, Czech-German journalist, philosopher, and theoretician (born 1854)
- 1948 – Royal Cortissoz, American art critic (born 1869)
- 1955 – Dimitrios Maximos, Greek banker and politician (born 1873)
- 1956 – Anne Crawford, Israeli-English actress (born 1920)
- 1957 – Wilhelmina Hay Abbott, Scottish suffragist and feminist (born 1884)
- 1958 – Paul Outerbridge, American photographer (born 1896)
- 1958 – Charlie Townsend, English cricketer and lawyer (born 1876)
- 1962 – Natalia Goncharova, Russian painter, costume designer, and set designer (born 1882)
- 1963 – Jacques Hadamard, French mathematician and academic (born 1865)
- 1965 – Bart King, American cricketer (born 1873)
- 1966 – Sidney Hatch, American runner and soldier (born 1883)
- 1966 – Wieland Wagner, German director and manager (born 1917)
- 1967 – Puyi, Chinese emperor (born 1906)
- 1970 – Pierre Laporte, Canadian journalist, lawyer, and politician (born 1921)
- 1970 – Vola Vale, American actress (born 1897)
- 1970 – Quincy Wright, American political scientist and academic (born 1890)
- 1972 – Turk Broda, Canadian ice hockey player and coach (born 1914)
- 1972 – George, Crown Prince of Serbia (born 1887)
- 1973 – Ingeborg Bachmann, Austrian author and poet (born 1926)
- 1978 – George Clark, American race car driver (born 1890)
- 1978 – Giovanni Gronchi, Italian educator, soldier, and politician, 3rd President of the Italian Republic (born 1887)
- 1979 – S. J. Perelman, American humorist and screenwriter (born 1904)
- 1979 – John Stuart, Scottish-English actor (born 1898)
- 1979 – Eugenio Mendoza, Venezuelan business tycoon (born 1909)
- 1981 – Kannadasan Indian author, poet, and songwriter (born 1927)
- 1981 – Albert Cohen, Greek-Swiss civil servant and author (born 1895)
- 1981 – Lina Tsaldari, Greek politician (born 1887)
- 1983 – Raymond Aron, French sociologist, political scientist, and philosopher (born 1905)
- 1987 – Abdul Malek Ukil, Bangladeshi lawyer and politician (born 1925)
- 1991 – Tennessee Ernie Ford, American singer and actor (born 1919)
- 1992 – Herman Johannes, Indonesian scientist, academic, and politician (born 1912)
- 1992 – Orestis Laskos, Greek actor, director, and screenwriter (born 1908)
- 1993 – Criss Oliva, American guitarist and songwriter (born 1963)
- 1996 – Chris Acland, English musician and drummer of Lush (born 1966)
- 1997 – Larry Jennings, American magician and author (born 1933)
- 1998 – Joan Hickson, English actress (born 1906)
- 1998 – Hakim Said, Pakistani scholar and politician, 20th Governor of Sindh (born 1920)
- 1999 – Nicholas Metropolis, Greek-American mathematician and physicist (born 1915)
- 2000 – Leo Nomellini, Italian-American football player and wrestler (born 1924)
- 2000 – Joachim Nielsen, Norwegian singer-songwriter and poet (born 1964)
- 2001 – Jay Livingston, American singer-songwriter (born 1915)
- 2001 – Micheline Ostermeyer, French shot putter, discus thrower, and pianist (born 1922)
- 2001 – Rehavam Ze'evi, Israeli historian, general, and politician, Tourism Minister of Israel (born 1926)
- 2002 – Derek Bell, Irish harpist and composer (born 1935)
- 2004 – Uzi Hitman, Israeli singer-songwriter (born 1952)
- 2006 – Daniel Emilfork, Chilean-French actor (born 1924)
- 2006 – Christopher Glenn, American journalist (born 1938)
- 2007 – Joey Bishop, American actor and talk show host (born 1918)
- 2007 – Teresa Brewer, American singer (born 1931)
- 2007 – Suzy Covey, American scholar and academic (born 1939)
- 2008 – Urmas Ott, Estonian journalist and author (born 1955)
- 2008 – Levi Stubbs, American singer (born 1936)
- 2008 – Ben Weider, Canadian businessman, co-founded the International Federation of BodyBuilding & Fitness (born 1923)
- 2009 – Norma Fox Mazer, American author and educator (born 1931)
- 2009 – Vic Mizzy, American composer (born 1916)
- 2011 – Carl Lindner, Jr., American businessman (born 1919)
- 2012 – Milija Aleksic, English-South African footballer (born 1951)
- 2012 – Émile Allais, French skier (born 1912)
- 2012 – Henry Friedlander, German-American historian and author (born 1930)
- 2012 – Stanford R. Ovshinsky, American scientist and businessman, co-founded Energy Conversion Devices (born 1922)
- 2012 – Kōji Wakamatsu, Japanese director, producer, and screenwriter (born 1936)
- 2013 – Mother Antonia, American-Mexican nun and activist (born 1926)
- 2013 – Terry Fogerty, English rugby player and coach (born 1944)
- 2013 – Arthur Maxwell House, Canadian neurologist and politician, 10th Lieutenant Governor of Newfoundland and Labrador (born 1926)
- 2013 – Lou Scheimer, American animator, producer, and voice actor, co-founded the Filmation Company (born 1928)
- 2013 – Rene Simpson, Canadian-American tennis player (born 1966)
- 2014 – Edwards Barham, American farmer and politician (born 1937)
- 2014 – Masaru Emoto, Japanese author and activist (born 1943)
- 2014 – Tom Shaw, American bishop (born 1945)
- 2014 – Berndt von Staden, German diplomat, German Ambassador to the United States (born 1919)
- 2015 – Danièle Delorme, French actress and producer (born 1926)
- 2015 – Howard Kendall, English footballer and manager (born 1946)
- 2015 – Anne-Marie Lizin, Belgian lawyer and politician (born 1949)
- 2015 – Tom Smith, American businessman and politician (born 1947)
- 2017 – Gord Downie, Canadian musician (born 1964)
- 2019 – Elijah Cummings, American politician and civil rights advocate (born 1951)
- 2024 – Mitzi Gaynor, American actress, singer, and dancer (born 1931)
- 2024 – Toshiyuki Nishida, Japanese actor (born 1947)
- 2024 – Andrew Schally, Polish-American endocrinologist (born 1926)

== Holidays and observances ==
- Christian feast day:
  - Anstrudis
  - Catervus
  - Blessed Contardo Ferrini
  - Ethelred and Ethelberht
  - Florentius of Orange
  - François-Isidore Gagelin (one of Vietnamese Martyrs)
  - Gilbert the Great
  - Hosea
  - Ignatius of Antioch
  - John the Short (John Colobus)
  - John of Egypt
  - Marguerite Marie Alacoque (pre-1969 calendar, Visitadines)
  - Nothhelm
  - Blessed Pietro Casani
  - Rufus and Zosimus
  - Rule of Andrew
  - Richard Gwyn
  - October 17 (Eastern Orthodox liturgics)
- International Day for the Eradication of Poverty
- Loyalty Day (Argentina)
- National Police Day (Thailand)
- National Heroes Day (Somaliland)
