= Rüdiger Wittig =

German botanist (born 1946)

Rüdiger Wittig (born October 17, 1946 in Herne, West Germany) is a professor of geobotany and ecology at the Goethe University Frankfurt in Frankfurt am Main, Germany.

== Career ==
From 1968 to 1973, Wittig studied biology and chemistry at the Wilhelms-University of Westphalia in Münster and passed the state examination, followed by doctoral studies from 1973 to 1976 (Dr.rer.nat.). Until the completion of his postdoctoral lecture qualification in 1980, he was a research associate at the Wilhelms-University in Münster. From 1980 until 1988, Wittig was professor for botany at the Heinrich Heine University of Düsseldorf and chair of the department for geobotany at the Institute for Plant Physiology. Since 1989, he has been a professor for ecology and geobotany at the Goethe University Frankfurt in Frankfurt am Main.

In 2002, a specific type of blackberry was named after Rüdiger Wittig: Rubus wittigianus.

== Selected publications ==
Wittig has published over 250 books and articles, including:

- R. Wittig: Ökologie der Großstadtflora. G. Fischer, Stuttgart/Jena 1991, 261 S. ISBN 3-437-20460-2
- Herbert Sukopp u. R. Wittig (Hrsg.): Stadtökologie. G. Fischer, Stuttgart 1993, 402 S. ISBN 3-437-26000-6
- R. Wittig: Siedlungsvegetation. Ulmer, Stuttgart 2002, 252 S. ISBN 3-8001-3693-7
- R. Wittig u. Bruno Streit (Hrsg.): Ökologie.- UTB basics, Verlag Eugen Ulmer, Stuttgart 2004, 303 S. ISBN 3-8252-2542-9
