= Jean-Marie Pelt =

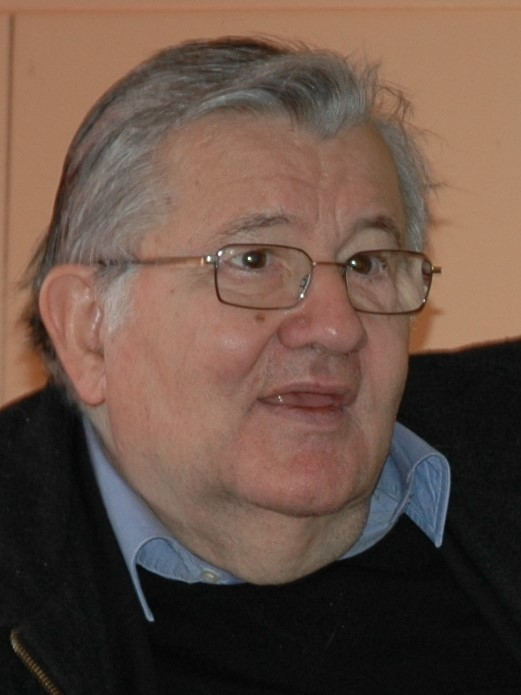
- Jean-Marie Pelt in 2008
- Born: 24 October 1933; Thionville, Moselle, France
- Died: 23 December 2015 (aged 82); Vantoux, Moselle, France
- Known for: Books on pharmaceutical plants
- Awards: Officer of the Légion d'honneur
- Scientific career
- Fields: Botany, pharmacy
- Institutions: University of Nancy, University of Lorraine

Jean-Marie Pelt (24 October 1933 – 23 December 2015) was a French biologist, botanist and pharmacist with degrees in both biology and pharmacy.

== Career ==
He was professor at the University of Lorraine, specializing in medicinal plants and traditional pharmacopeia, and is the author of several scientific articles and books on pharmaceutical plants, plant biology and urban ecology. Pelt was known to the French public as the producer of several television series and radio broadcasts on plant biology and ecology. He has been nicknamed the Konrad Lorenz of the vegetable world.

== Scientific works ==
Through his academic career, Pelt studied the science of medicinal plants, phytopharmacology, phytotherapy, and phytotoxicology. He specifically focused on the repertories of drugs and medicinal plants of Afghanistan, Chile, Europe, and Yemen.

== Institutional roles ==
In addition to his research work at the university of Nancy and more recently the University of Lorraine, Pelt founded the European Institute of Ecology in 1972 and co-founded the French Society of Ethnopharmacology in 1987 and the Committee of Independent Research and Information on the Genetic Engineering in 1999. Along with Simone Veil, Jacques Delors or Corinne Lepage, Pelt was a fellow member of the Committee 21, the French deliberative assembly for the environment and sustainable development which is in charge of implementing the Agenda 21 action plan.

== Urban ecology concepts and applications ==
Thought of a biologist on the evolution of the Western industrial societies, notably European ones; search for new balances based on the respect of some fundamental rules: justice, economy toward ecology, new culture and school.

– Blurb of The re-naturalized Human, 1977 book of Jean-Marie Pelt in which he developed his pioneering approach of urban ecology.

As municipal councilor of Metz between 1971 and 1983, Pelt pioneered a policy of urban ecology. Because of the failure in post-war urban planning and housing estates occurring in Europe during the 1960s, and gathering inspiration from the concepts of CIAM, Professor Pelt initiated a new approach towards the urban environment. He developed his ideas on this topic in The Re-Naturalized Human, a pioneering book from 1977 which was awarded the European Prize of Ecology.

Based on the ideas of the Chicago School, Pelt's theories advocated for a better integration of humans into their environment and developed a concept concerning the relation between "stones and waters". His ideas were materialized in Metz with the establishment of extensive open areas surrounding the Moselle and the Seille rivers and the development of large areas for walking. He died on 23 December 2015.

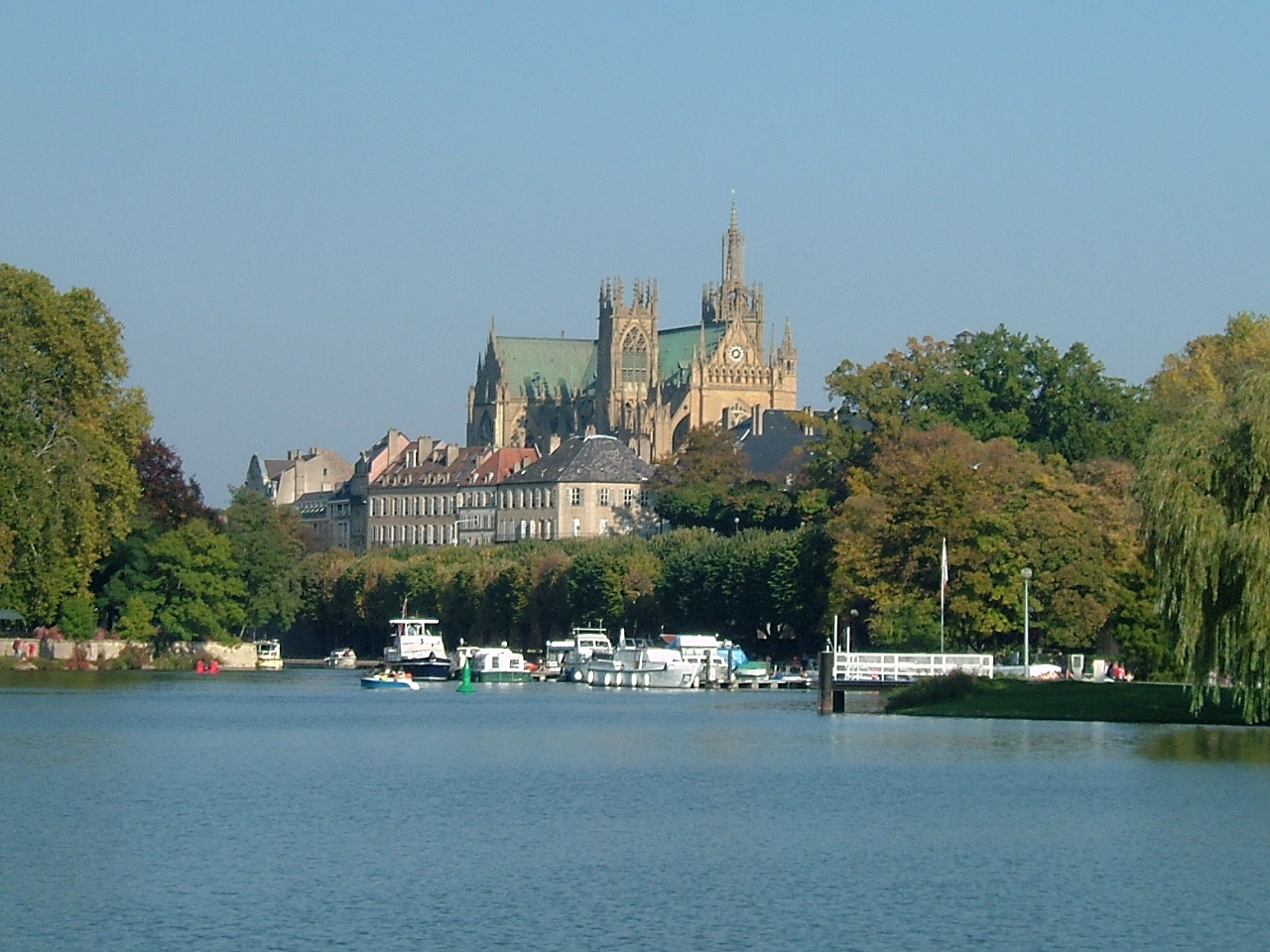
The creation of a water garden around a tributary stream of the Moselle river in Metz during the early 70s was one of the major materializations of Jean-Marie Pelt's urban ecology and planning concepts.

== Bibliography ==
- The medications (French: Les médicaments) (1969), Ed. Le Seuil. ISBN 2-02-000218-3
- Evolution and sexuality in plants (French: Évolution et sexualité des plantes) (1970), Eds. Horizons de France . ISBN 2850270490
- The re-naturalized Human (French: L’homme re-naturé) (1977), Eds. Le Seuil. ISBN 2-02-004589-3 - European Prize of Ecology
- Plants: loves and vegetable civilizations (French: Les plantes : amours et civilisations végétales) (1980), Eds. Fayard. ASIN B005P797 km
- Medicine by the plants (French: La Médecine par les plantes) (1981,1986), Eds. Fayard
- The tremendous adventure of the plants (French: La prodigieuse aventures des plantes) (1981), Eds. Fayard
- Drugs and magic plants (French: Drogues et plantes magiques) (1971,1980), (1983), Eds. Fayard
- Drugs, their history, their effects (French: Les drogues, leur histoire, leurs effets) (1983), Eds. Fayard
- The social life of the plants (French: La vie sociale des plantes) (1984), Eds. Fayard
- My most beautiful stories about plants (French: Mes plus belles histoires de plantes) (1986), Eds. Le Seuil
- Flowers, celebrations, and seasons (French: Fleurs, fêtes et saisons) (1986), Eds. Fayard
- The pedestrian of Metz (French: Le piéton de Metz) with Christian Legay (1988), Eds. Serpenoise
- Around the work of an ecologist (French: Le tour du monde d’un écologiste) (1990), Eds. Fayard
- At the back of my garden (French: Au fond de mon jardin) (1992), Eds. Fayard
- The child of the possible (French: L'enfant du possible) (1992), Eds. Albin Michel
- Vegetables (French: Des légumes) (1993), Eds. Fayard
- The plants' world (French: Le monde des plantes) (1993), collection Petit Point, Eds. Seuil
- A lesson of nature (French: Une leçon de nature) (1993), Eds. l'Esprit du temps
- Fruits (French: Des fruits) (1994), Eds. Fayard
- Universe's God, science and faith (French: Dieu de l’univers, science et foi) (1995), Eds. Fayard
- Words of nature (French: Paroles de nature) (1995), Eds. Albin Michel
- The secrete languages of the nature (French: Les Langages secrets de la nature) (1996), Eds. Fayard
- From the universe to the Being (French: De l’univers à l’être) (1996), Eds. Fayard
- The plants in danger (French: Les plantes en péril) (1997), Eds. Fayard
- The soul's garden (French: Le jardin de l’âme) (1998), Eds. Fayard
- The most beautiful story about plants (French: La plus belle histoire des plantes) with M. Mazoyer, Théodore Monod, and J. Giradon (1999), Eds. Le Seuil
- The cinnamon and the panda (French: La cannelle et le panda) (1999), Eds. Fayard
- The Earth in inheritance (French: La terre en héritage) (2000), Eds. Fayard
- Variation on celebrations and seasons (French: Variations sur les fêtes et les saisons) (2000), Eds. Le Pommier
- Listening the trees (French: À l’écoute des arbres) (2000), Eds. Albin Michel
- The life is my garden (French: La vie est mon jardin) (2000), Eds. Alice, Belgique
- The new natural remedies (French: Les nouveaux remèdes naturels) (2001), Eds. Fayard
- Spices (French: Les Épices) (2002), Eds. Fayard
- The future straight in the eyes (French: L’avenir droit dans les yeux) (2002), Eds. Fayard
- The law of the jungle (French: La loi de la jungle) with Franck Steffan (2003), Eds. Fayard
- Solidarity in plants, animals, and humans (French: La Solidarité chez les plantes, les animaux, les humains) (2004), Eds. Fayard
- Virtues of the plants (French: Les vertus des plantes), pictures of Peter Lippmann (2004), Eds. Chêne
- Around the world of an ecologist, once again (French: Le Nouveau tour du monde d'un écologiste) (2005), Eds. Fayard
- Those plants we are eating (French: Ces plantes que l'on mange) (2006), Eds. Chêne
- After us, the Deluge? (French: Après nous le déluge ?) with Gilles-Éric Séralini (2006), Eds. Flammarion/Fayard
- Ecology and spirituality (French: Écologie et spiritualité) collective work (2006), Eds. Albin Michel
- It's green and it's walking (French: C'est vert et ça marche) with Franck Steffan (2007), Eds. Fayard
- Beauty of flowers and decorative plants (French: La beauté des fleurs et des plantes décoratives) (2007), Eds. Chêne
- Nature and spirituality (French: Nature et Spiritualité) (2008), Eds. Fayard
- Le monde s'est-il créé tout seul ? with Albert Jacquard, Trinh Xuan Thuan, Ilya Prigogine, and Joël De Rosnay (2008), Eds. Albin Michel
- The reason of the weakest (French: La raison du plus faible) with Franck Steffan (2009), Eds. Fayard
- Little story of plants: the diary of a committed botanist (French: Petite histoire des plantes : Carnet de bord d'un botaniste engagé) (2009), Eds. Carnets Nord
- The precious gifts of the nature (French: Les dons précieux de la nature) (2010), Eds. Fayard
- The paths of happiness (French: Les voies du bonheur) (2010), Eds. de la Martinière
- Evolution as seen by a botanist (French: L'Evolution vue par un botaniste) (2011), Eds. Fayard
