= Urban ecology =

Scientific study of living organisms

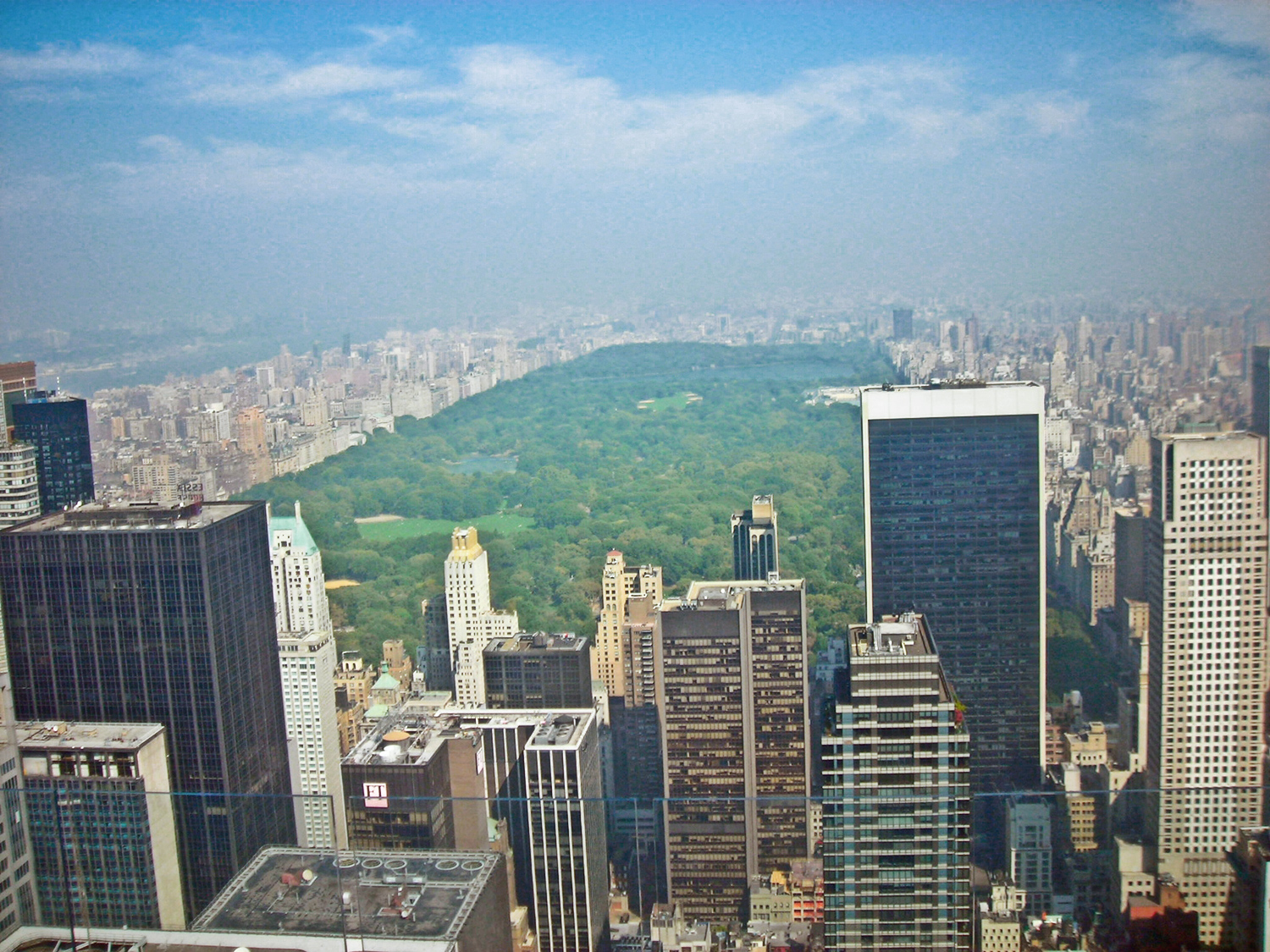
New York City's Central Park represents an ecosystem fragment within a larger urban environment.

Urban ecology is the scientific study of the relation of living organisms with each other and their surroundings in an urban environment. An urban environment refers to environments dominated by high-density residential and commercial buildings, paved surfaces, and other urban-related factors that create a unique landscape. The goal of urban ecology is to achieve a balance between human culture and the natural environment.

Urban ecology is a recent field of study compared to ecology. Currently, most of the information in this field is based on the easier to study species of mammals and birds [source needed]. To close the gap in knowledge, attention should be paid to all species in the urban space like insects and fish. This study should also expand to suburban spaces with its unique mix of development and surrounding nature. The methods and studies of urban ecology is a subset of ecology. The study of urban ecology carries increasing importance because more than 50% of the world's population today lives in urban areas. It is also estimated that within the next 40 years, two-thirds of the world's population will be living in expanding urban centers. The ecological processes in the urban environment are comparable to those outside the urban context. However, the types of urban habitats and the species that inhabit them are poorly documented which is why more research should be done in urban ecology.

== History ==
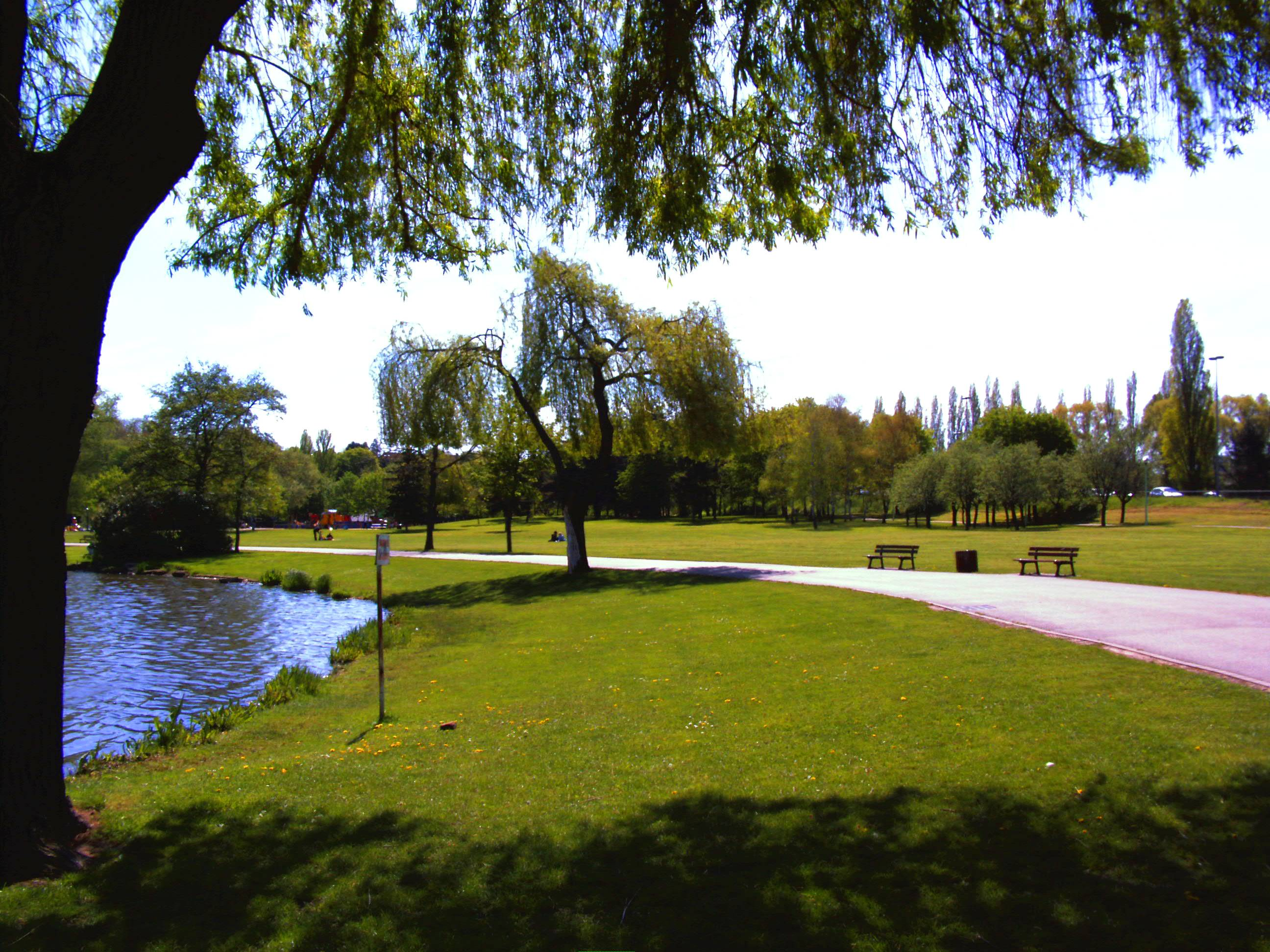
The creation of an important stream water garden in Metz's centre during the early 1970s was one of the materializations of Jean-Marie Pelt's works on urban ecology.

Historically, ecology has focused on natural environments, but by the 1970s many ecologists began to turn their interest towards ecological interactions taking place in and caused by urban environments. In the nineteenth century, naturalists such as Malthus, De Candolle, Lyell, and Darwin found that competition for resources was crucial in controlling population growth and is a driver of extinction. This concept was the basis of evolutionary ecology. Jean-Marie Pelt's 1977 book The Re-Naturalized Human, Brian Davis' 1978 publication Urbanization and the diversity of insects, and Herbert Sukopp et al.'s 1979 article "The soil, flora and vegetation of Berlin's wastelands" are some of the first publications to recognize the importance of urban ecology as a separate and distinct form of ecology the same way one might see landscape ecology as different from population ecology. Forman and Godron's 1986 book Landscape Ecology first distinguished urban settings and landscapes from other landscapes by dividing all landscapes into five broad types. These types were divided by the intensity of human influence ranging from pristine natural environments to urban centers.

Early ecologists defined ecology as the study of organisms and their environment. As time progressed urban ecology was recognized as a diverse and complex concept which differs in application between North America and Europe. The European concept of urban ecology examines the biota of urban areas, the North American concept has traditionally examined the social sciences of the urban landscape, as well as the ecosystem fluxes and processes, and the Latin American concept examines the effect of human activity on the biodiversity and fluxes of urban ecosystems. A renaissance in the development of urban ecology occurred in the 1990s that was initiated by the US National Science Foundation funding two urban long-term ecological research centers and this promoted the study of urban ecology.

The field of urban ecology is rapidly expanding, with an increasing number of dedicated research centers emerging. Among the pioneers are the Urban Ecology Research Laboratory (UERL) at the University of Washington, established in 2001, and the Urban Ecology Laboratory (LEU) at the Costa Rican Distance University, founded in 2008. The UERL in Washington specializes in analyzing urban landscape patterns, ecosystem functions, modeling land cover changes, and developing scenarios for urban adaptation within the state. In contrast, Costa Rica's LEU holds distinction as the world's first research center exclusively devoted to studying tropical urban ecosystems. Research conducted there spans various facets of urban ecology, including biodiversity, the impacts of climate change on cities and their surrounding areas (particularly tropical highlands), and the intricate interactions between human activities and urban environments.

== Methods ==
Since urban ecology is a subfield of ecology, many of the techniques are similar to that of ecology. Ecological study techniques have been developed over centuries, but many of the techniques use for urban ecology are more recently developed. Methods used for studying urban ecology involve chemical and biochemical techniques, temperature recording, heat mapping remote sensing, and long-term ecological research sites.

=== Chemical and biochemical techniques ===
Chemical techniques may be used to determine pollutant concentrations and their effects. Tests can be as simple as dipping a manufactured test strip, as in the case of pH testing, or be more complex, as in the case of examining the spatial and temporal variation of heavy metal contamination due to industrial runoff. In that particular study, livers of birds from many regions of the North Sea were ground up and mercury was extracted. Additionally, mercury bound in feathers was extracted from both live birds and from museum specimens to test for mercury levels across many decades. Through these two different measurements, researchers were able to make a complex picture of the spread of mercury due to industrial runoff both spatially and temporally.

Other chemical techniques include tests for nitrates, phosphates, sulfates, etc. which are commonly associated with urban pollutants such as fertilizer and industrial byproducts. These biochemical fluxes are studied in the atmosphere (e.g. greenhouse gases), aquatic ecosystems and soil nematodes. Broad reaching effects of these biochemical fluxes can be seen in various aspects of both the urban and surrounding rural ecosystems.

=== Temperature data and heat mapping ===
Temperature data can be used for various kinds of studies. An important aspect of temperature data is the ability to correlate temperature with various factors that may be affecting or occurring in the environment. Oftentimes, temperature data is collected long-term by the Office of Oceanic and Atmospheric Research (OAR), and made available to the scientific community through the National Oceanic and Atmospheric Administration (NOAA). Data can be overlaid with maps of terrain, urban features, and other spatial areas to create heat maps. These heat maps can be used to view trends and distribution over time and space.

=== Remote sensing ===
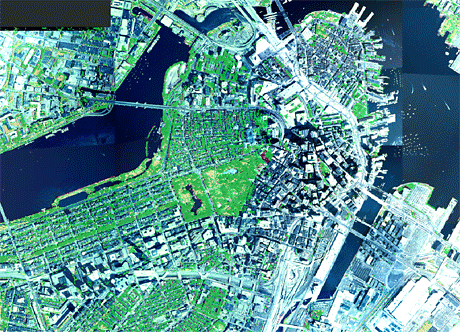
Urban tree canopy in Boston. Remote sensing allows collection of data using sources including satellites.

Remote sensing is the technique in which data is collected from distant locations through the use of satellite imaging, radar, and aerial photographs. In urban ecology, remote sensing is used to collect data about terrain, weather patterns, light, and vegetation. One application of remote sensing for urban ecology is to detect the productivity of an area by measuring the photosynthetic wavelengths of emitted light. Satellite images can also be used to detect differences in temperature and landscape diversity to detect the effects of urbanization.

=== LTERs and long-term data sets ===
Long-term ecological research (LTER) sites are research sites funded by the government that have collected reliable long-term data over an extended period of time in order to identify long-term climatic or ecological trends. These sites provide long-term temporal and spatial data such as average temperature, rainfall and other ecological processes. The main purpose of LTERs for urban ecologists is the collection of vast amounts of data over long periods of time. These long-term data sets can then be analyzed to find trends relating to the effects of the urban environment on various ecological processes, such as species diversity and abundance over time. Another example is the examination of temperature trends that are accompanied with the growth of urban centers. There are currently two active urban LTERs: Central Arizona-Phoenix (CAP), first launched in 1997 and housed at Arizona State University and Minneapolis-St. Paul Metropolitan Area (MSP). The Baltimore Ecosystem Study (BES) was originally funded in 1998 as an urban LTER but as is no longer funded by the National Science Foundation as of 2021.

== Urban effects on the environment ==
Humans are the driving force behind urban ecology and influence the environment in a variety of ways - urbanization being a key example. Urbanization is tied to social, economic and environmental processes. There are six core aspects: air pollution, ecosystems, land use, biogeochemical cycles, water pollution, solid waste management, and the climate. Urbanization was driven by migration into cities and the rapid environmental implications that came with it; increased carbon emissions, energy consumption, impaired ecology; all primarily negative. Despite the impacts, the perception of urbanization at present is shifting from challenges to solutions. Cities are home to an abundant amount of financially well-off, knowledgeable and innovative initiators who are increasing the involvement of science in urban policy processes and concepts. The intersection of the multiple processes/integrated systems approach which can easily emerge within a city, includes five characteristics that can emphasize this fundamental shift at a low cost. These solutions are integrated, comprehensive, multifunctional approaches that speak to the social, economic, and cultural contexts of cities. They take into account the chemical, biophysical, and ecological aspects that define urban systems, including lifestyle choices that are interlinked with the culture of a city. However, despite adapting the opportunities that a city can participate in, the results of the concepts that researchers have developed remains uncertain.

=== Modification of land and waterways ===
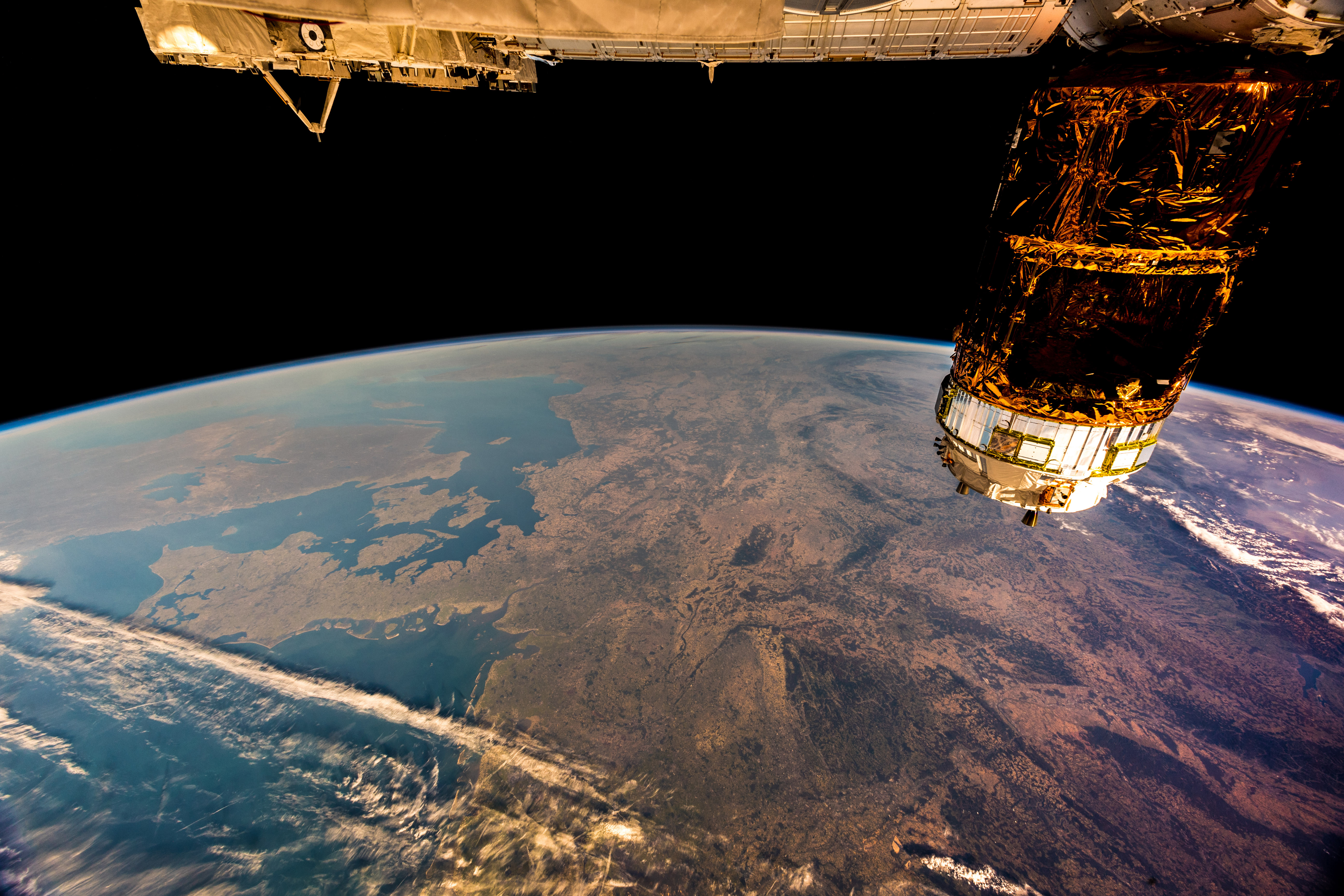
Deforestation in Europe

Humans place high demand on land not only to build urban centers, but also to build surrounding suburban areas for housing. Land is also allocated for agriculture to sustain the growing population of the city. Expanding cities and suburban areas necessitate corresponding deforestation to meet the land-use and resource requirements of urbanization. Key examples of this are Deforestation in the United States and Europe.

Along with manipulation of land to suit human needs, natural water resources such as rivers and streams are also modified in urban establishments. Modification can come in the form of dams, artificial canals, and even the reversal of rivers. Reversing the flow of the Chicago River is a major example of urban environmental modification. Urban areas in natural desert settings often bring in water from far areas to maintain the human population and will likely have effects on the local desert climate. Modification of aquatic systems in urban areas also results in decreased stream diversity and increased pollution.

=== Trade, shipping, and spread of invasive species ===
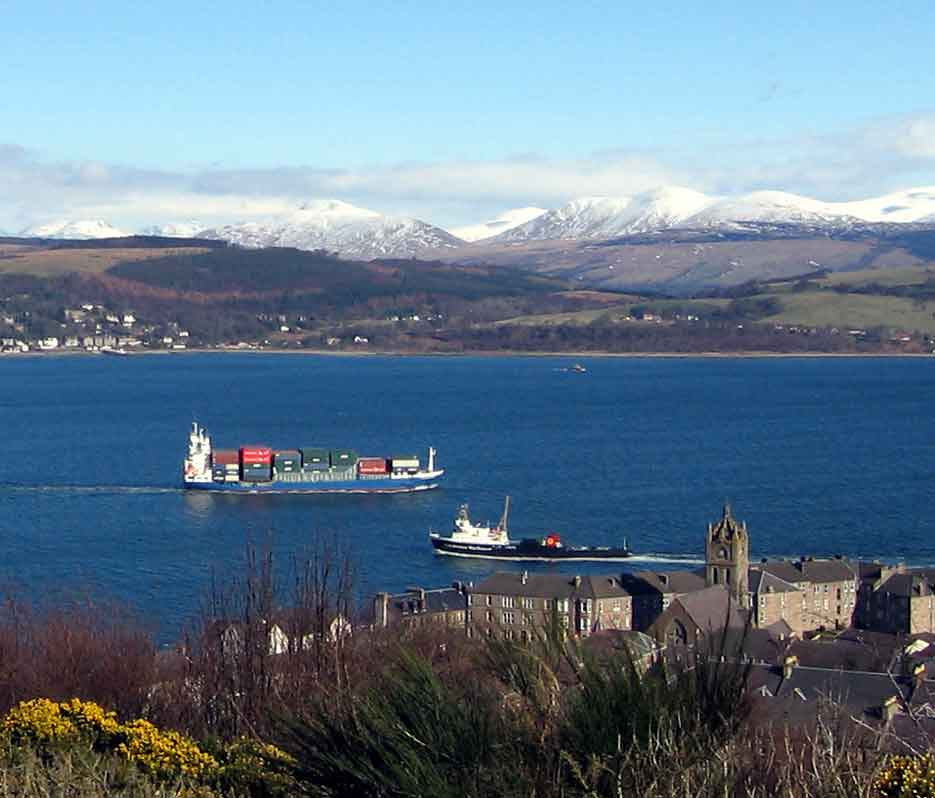
Potentially carrying invasive species through the Firth of Clyde

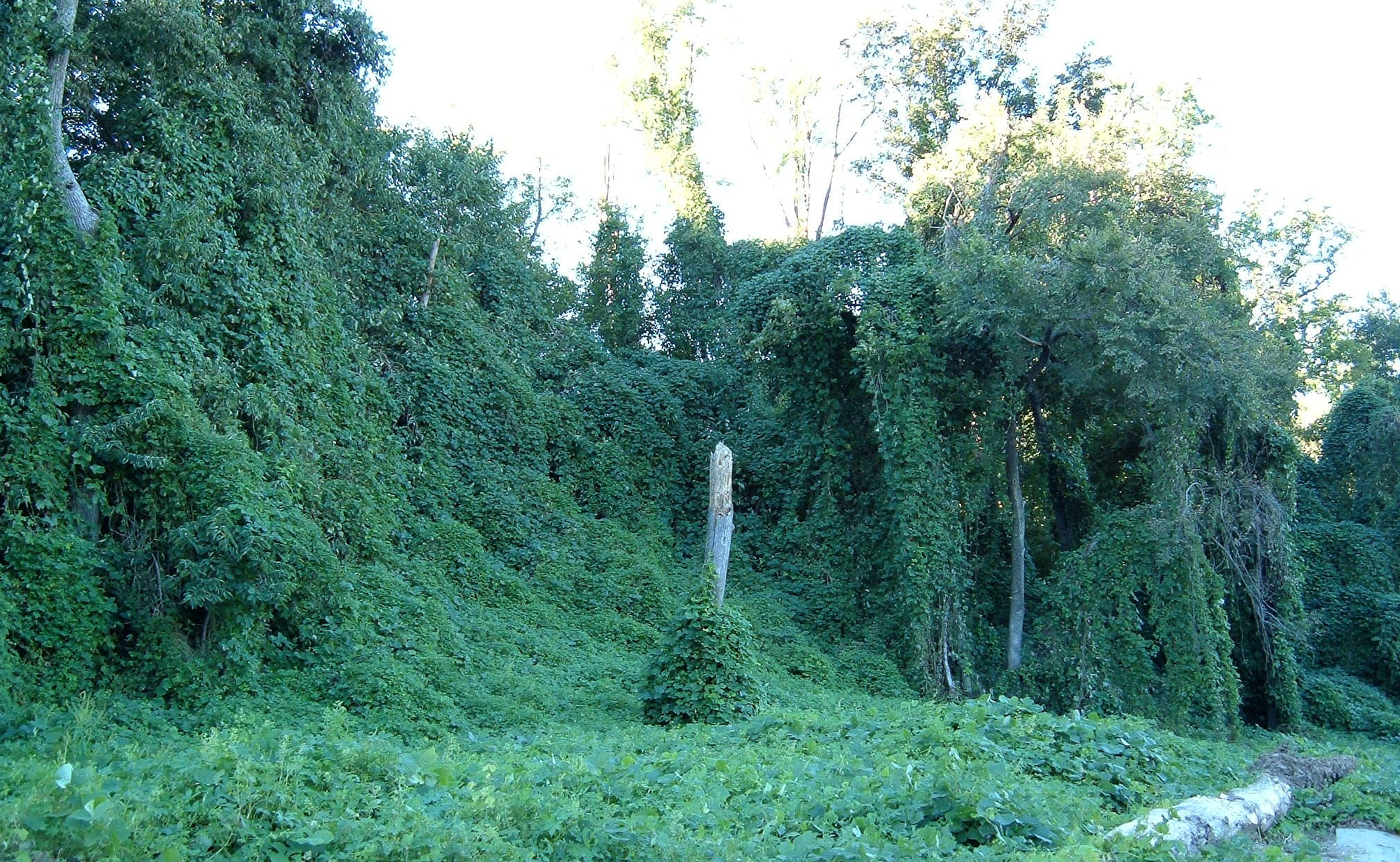
Kudzu, Atlanta

Both local shipping and long-distance trade are required to meet the resource demands important in maintaining urban areas. Carbon dioxide emissions from the transport of goods also contribute to accumulating greenhouse gasses and nutrient deposits in the soil and air of urban environments. In addition, shipping facilitates the unintentional spread of living organisms, and introduces them to environments that they would not naturally inhabit. Introduced or alien species are populations of organisms living in a range in which they did not naturally evolve due to intentional or inadvertent human activity. Increased transportation between urban centers furthers the incidental movement of animal and plant species. Alien species often have no natural predators and pose a substantial threat to the dynamics of existing ecological populations in the environment into which they are introduced. Invasive species are successful when they are able to have proliferate reproduction due to short life cycles, contain or adapt to have traits that suit the environment and appear in high densities. Such invasive species are numerous and include house sparrows, ring-necked pheasants, European starlings, brown rats, Asian carp, American bullfrogs, emerald ash borer, kudzu vines, and zebra mussels among numerous others, most notably domesticated animals. Brown rats are a highly invasive species in urban environments, and are commonly seen in the streets and subways of New York City, where they pose multiple negative effects to infrastructure, native species and human health. Brown rats carry several types of parasites and pathogens that can possibly infect humans and other animals. In New York City a genetic study exploring genome wide variation concluded that multiple rats were originally from Great Britain. In Australia, it has been found that removing Lantana (L. camara, an alien species) from urban green spaces can have negative impacts on bird diversity locally, as it provides refugia for species like the superb fairy (Malurus cyaneus) and silvereye (Zosterops lateralis), in the absence of native plant equivalents. Although, there seems to be a density threshold in which too much Lantana (thus homogeneity in vegetation cover) can lead to a decrease in bird species richness or abundance.

=== Effects of urban animals on humans ===
==== Positive effects ====
Some urban animals can have a positive impact on the lives of humans. Studies show that the presence of domestic animals can reduce stress, anxiety and loneliness. Additionally some urban animals act as predators to animals like insects, etc., that can be harmful to humans Also urban species can serve many more purposes including agriculture, transport, and protection.

==== Negative effects ====
Some urban species have a negative impact on humans. For example, pests' urine, fecal matter, and skin fragments can spread germs if ingested by humans. Diseases caused by pests or insects can be fatal. They include: salmonella, meningitis, Weil's disease, Lyme disease, etc. Some people are allergic to certain insects like bees, wasps and therefore being exposed to them will cause serious allergic responses (rashes for example).

According to Seth Magle, attacks from wildlife in an urban setting, while rare are detrimental to societal views on wildlife. Due to media coverage of these rare attacks, urban populations assume these interactions as more common than they really are which further affects the tolerance of urban wildlife.

=== Human effects on biogeochemical pathways ===
Urbanization results in a large demand for chemical use by industry, construction, agriculture, and energy providing services. Such demands have a substantial impact on biogeochemical cycles, resulting in phenomena such as acid rain, eutrophication, and global warming. Furthermore, natural biogeochemical cycles in the urban environment can be impeded due to impermeable surfaces that prevent nutrients from returning to the soil, water, and atmosphere.

Carbon cycle

Demand for fertilizers to meet agricultural needs exerted by expanding urban centers can alter chemical composition of soil. Such effects often result in abnormally high concentrations of compounds including sulfur, phosphorus, nitrogen, and heavy metals. In addition, nitrogen and phosphorus used in fertilizers have caused severe problems in the form of agricultural runoff, which alters the concentration of these compounds in local rivers and streams, often resulting in adverse effects on native species. A well-known effect of agricultural runoff is the phenomenon of eutrophication. When the fertilizer chemicals from agricultural runoff reach the ocean, an algal bloom results, then rapidly dies off. The dead algae biomass is decomposed by bacteria that also consume large quantities of oxygen, which they obtain from the water, creating a "dead zone" without oxygen for fish or other organisms. A classic example is the dead zone in the Gulf of Mexico due to agricultural runoff into the Mississippi River.

Just as pollutants and alterations in the biogeochemical cycle alter river and ocean ecosystems, they exert likewise effects in the air. Some stems from the accumulation of chemicals and pollution and often manifests in urban settings, which has a great impact on local plants and animals. Because urban centers are often considered point sources for pollution, local plants have adapted to withstand such conditions.

== Urban effects on climate ==
Urban environments and outlying areas have been found to exhibit unique local temperatures, precipitation, and other characteristic activity due to a variety of factors such as pollution and altered geochemical cycles. Some examples of the urban effects on climate are urban heat island, oasis effect, greenhouse gases, and acid rain. This further stirs the debate as to whether urban areas should be considered a unique biome. Despite common trends among all urban centers, the surrounding local environment heavily influences much of the climate. One such example of regional differences can be seen through the urban heat island and oasis effect.

=== Urban heat island effect ===
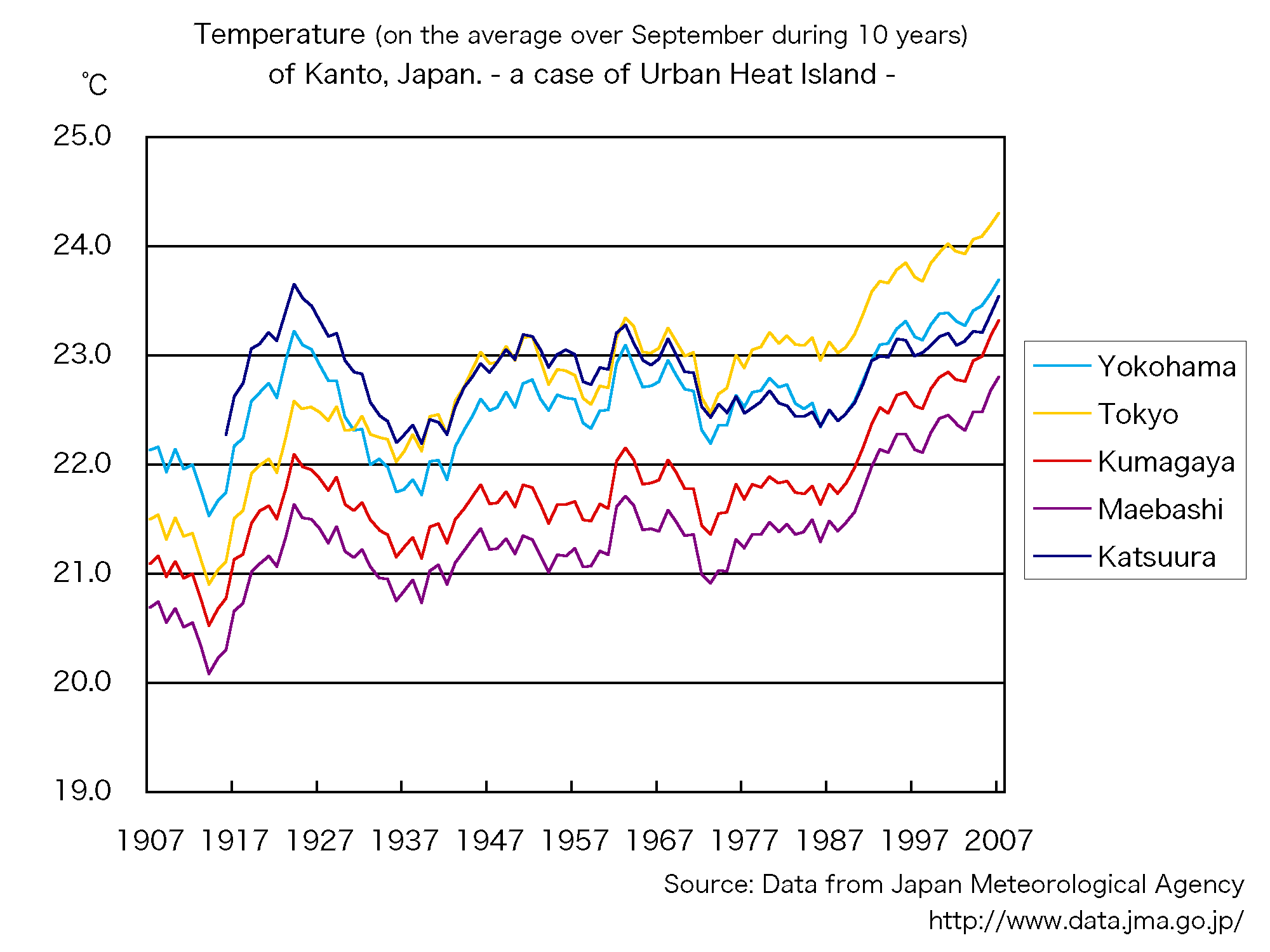

The urban heat island is a phenomenon in which central regions of urban centers exhibit higher mean temperatures than surrounding urban areas. Much of this effect can be attributed to low city albedo, the reflecting power of a surface, and the increased surface area of buildings to absorb solar radiation. Concrete, cement, and metal surfaces in urban areas tend to absorb heat energy rather than reflect it, contributing to higher urban temperatures. Brazel et al. found that the urban heat island effect demonstrates a positive correlation with population density in the city of Baltimore. The heat island effect has corresponding ecological consequences on resident species. However, this effect has only been seen in temperate climates.

=== Greenhouse gases ===
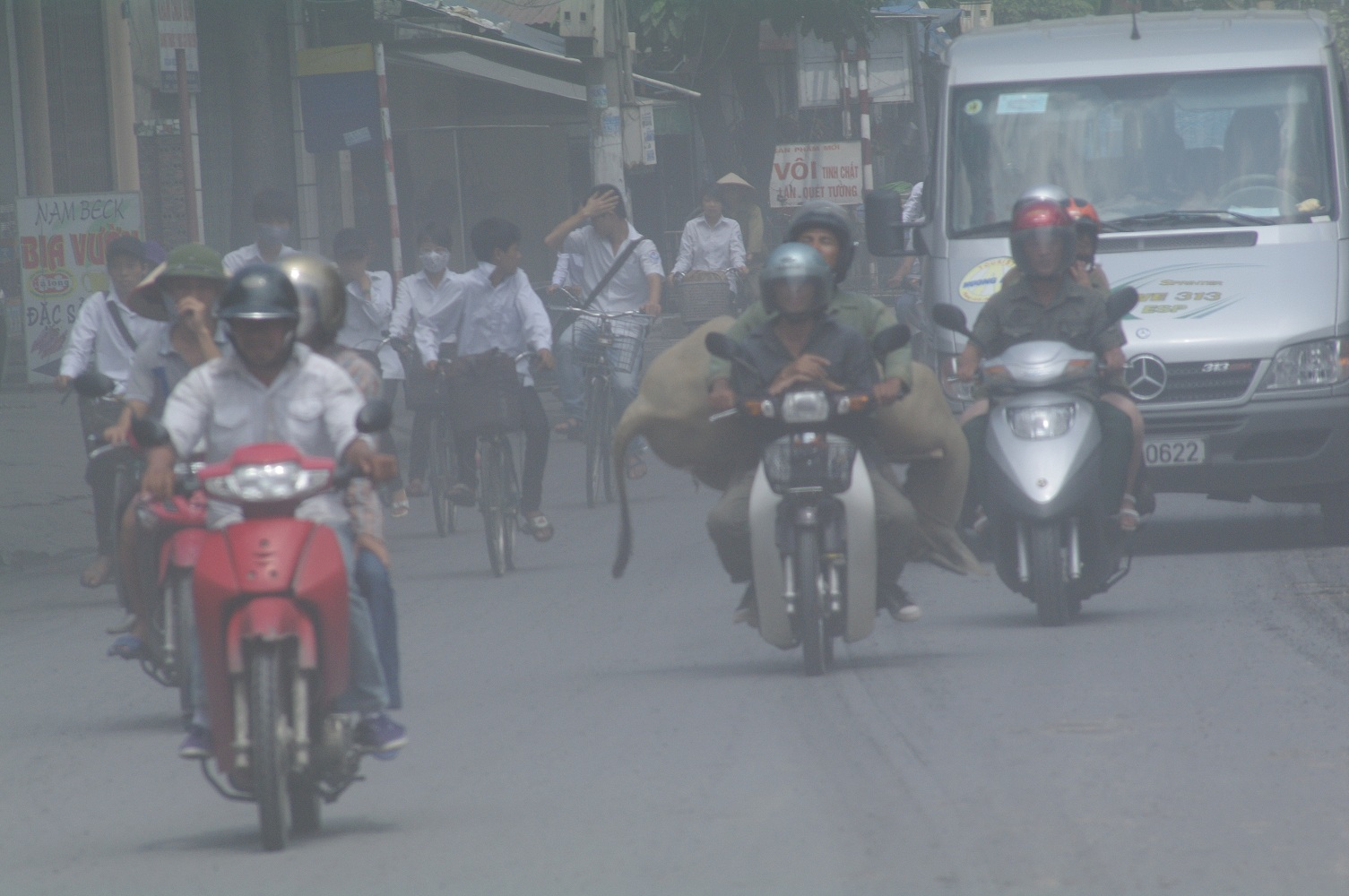
Traffic pollution in Vietnam

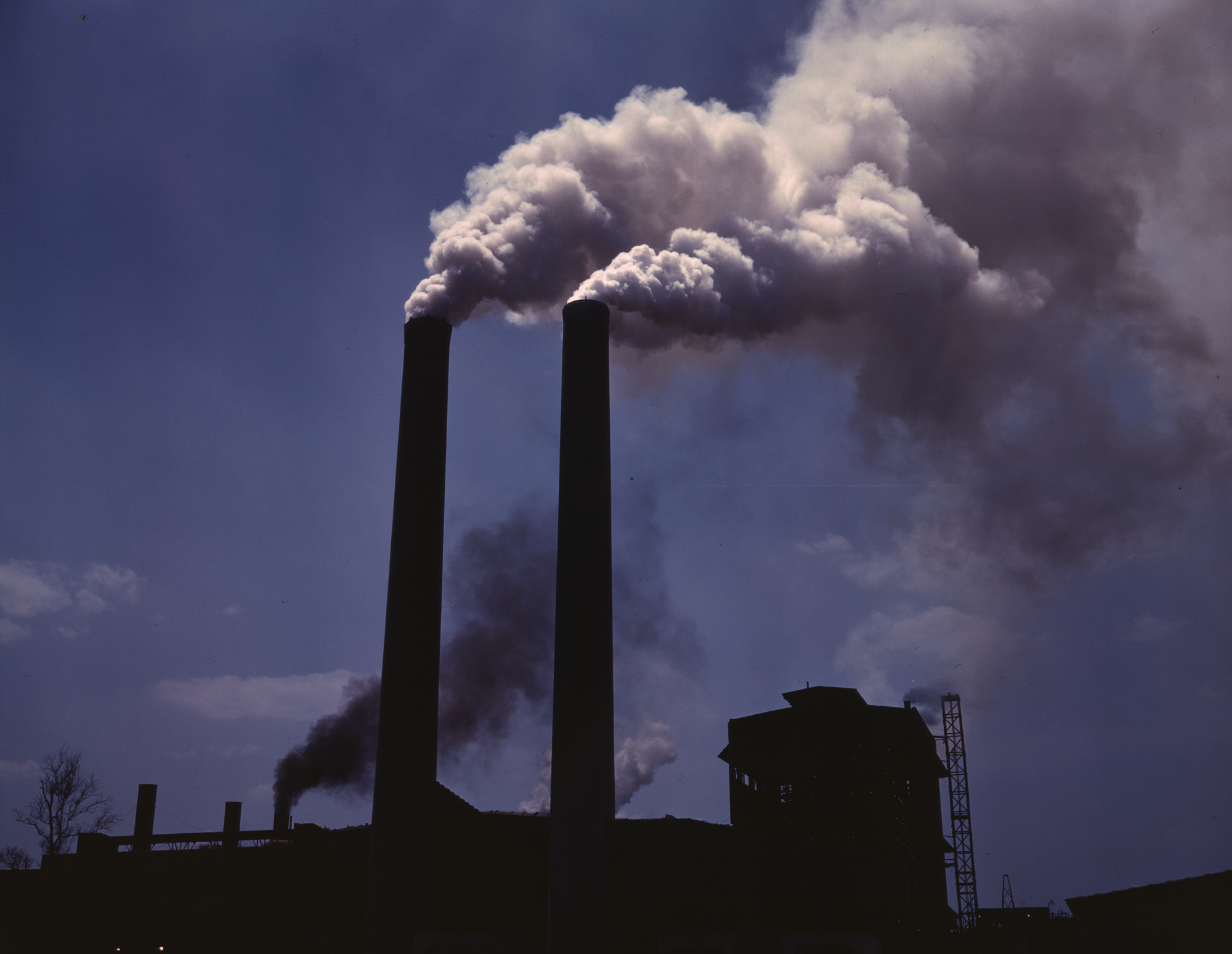
Wartime industry

Emissions of greenhouse gases allow humans to inhabit the earth because they capture heat from the sun to make the climate adequate. In 1896, Swedish scientist Svante Arrhenius established that fossil fuels caused carbon dioxide emissions (the most abundant and harmful greenhouse gas) . In the 20th century, American climate scientist James E. Hansen concluded that Greenhouse effect is changing the climate for the worse.

Carbon dioxide is the most abundant greenhouse gas and accounts for 3/4 of emissions. It is emitted by burning coal, oil, gas, wood, and other organic material. Another greenhouse gas is methane. it can come from landfill, natural gases, and or petroleum industries. Nitrous oxide accounts for about 6% of the emissions, and can come from fertilizers, manure, burning of agricultural residues, and or fuel. Finally, fluorinated gases account for 2% of greenhouse gas emissions and can come from refrigerants, solvents, etc. The excessive emission of greenhouse gases is responsible for much of the harm that can be observed today including global warming, respiratory diseases due to pollution, extinction or migration of certain species, etc. These issues can be reduced if not resolved by eliminating the use of fossil fuels in favor of renewable energy sources.

=== Acid rain and pollution ===
Processes related to urban areas result in the emission of numerous pollutants, which change corresponding nutrient cycles of carbon, sulfur, nitrogen, and other elements. Ecosystems in and around the urban center are especially influenced by these point sources of pollution. High sulfur dioxide concentrations resulting from the industrial demands of urbanization cause rainwater to become more acidic. Such an effect has been found to have a significant influence on locally affected populations, especially in aquatic environments. Wastes from urban centers, especially large urban centers in developed nations, can drive biogeochemical cycles on a global scale.

=== Urban environment as an anthropogenic biome ===
The urban environment has been classified as an anthropogenic biome, which is characterized by the predominance of certain species and climate trends such as urban heat island across many urban areas. Examples of species characteristic of many urban environments include, cats, dogs, mosquitoes, rats, flies, and pigeons, which are all generalists. Many of these are dependent on human activity and have adapted accordingly to the niche created by urban centers. However, the large number of wild species being discovered in urban areas around the world suggest that a bewildering diversity of life is able to call urban areas their home. The relationship between urbanisation and wildlife diversity may not be as straightforward as previously imagined. This change in imagination has been possible due to coverage of a much larger number of cities in varied parts of the world that now show that past trends and assumptions were largely due to a bias in coverage of cities in temperate, developed countries.

== Biodiversity and urbanization ==
Research in countries of temperate areas indicates that, on a small scale, urbanization often increases the biodiversity of non-native species while reducing that of native species. This normally results in an overall reduction in species richness and increase in total biomass and species abundance. Urbanization reduces diversity on a large scale in cities of developed countries, but in tropical and subtropical cities, despite the high human densities, can retain very high diversity if small patches of habitats are retained across the city. Even domestic urban and suburban properties near high density city centres can support well over a thousand macro-organism species, many of which are often native. These urban landscapes can also support many complex ecosystem interactions. However, urbanization disrupts many other species interactions that would occur in undeveloped natural habitat.

Urban stream syndrome is a consistently observed trait of urbanization characterized by high nutrient and contaminant concentration, altered stream morphology, increased dominance of dominant species, and decreased biodiversity The two primary causes of urban stream syndrome are storm water runoff and wastewater treatment plant effluent.

=== Changes in diversity ===
Diversity is normally reduced at intermediate-low levels of urbanization but is always reduced at high levels of urbanization. These effects have been observed in vertebrates and invertebrates while plant species tend to increase with intermediate-low levels of urbanization but these general trends do not apply to all organisms within those groups. For example, McKinney's (2006) review did not include the effects of urbanization on fishes and of the 58 studies on invertebrates, 52 included insects while only 10 included spiders. There is also a geographical bias as most of the studies either took place in North America or Europe.

The effects of urbanization also depend on the type and range of resources used by the organism. Generalist species, those that use a wide range of resources and can thrive under a large range of living conditions, are likely to survive in uniform environments. Specialist species, those that use a narrow range of resources and can only cope with a narrow range of living conditions, are unlikely to cope with uniform environments. There will likely be a variable effect on these two groups of organisms as urbanization alters habitat uniformity. Endangered plant species have been reported to occur throughout a wide range of urban ecosystems, many of them being novel ecosystems.

A study of 463 bird species reported that urban species share dietary traits. Specifically, urban species were larger, consumed more vertebrates and carrion, and fed more frequently on the ground or aerially, and also had broader diets than non‐urban species. Such changes reflect the process of synurbization, in which wildlife populations undergo adaptive shifts in response to urban environments.

=== Cause of diversity change ===
The urban environment can decrease diversity through habitat removal and species homogenization—the increasing similarity between two previously distinct biological communities. Habitat degradation and habitat fragmentation reduces the amount of suitable habitat by urban development and separates suitable patches by inhospitable terrain such as roads, neighborhoods, and open parks. Although this replacement of suitable habitat with unsuitable habitat will result in extinctions of native species, some shelter may be artificially created and promote the survival of non-native species (e.g. house sparrow and house mice nests). Urbanization promotes species homogenization through the extinction of native endemic species and the introduction of non-native species that already have a widespread abundance. This homogenization effect extends to parasite communities: in California cities, specialist avian blood parasites like Haemoproteus decline, while generalists like Plasmodium persist and increase with rainfall, potentially altering wildlife disease dynamics. Changes to the habitat may promote both the extinction of native endemic species and the introduction of non-native species. The effects of habitat change will likely be similar in all urban environments as urban environments are all built to cater to the needs of humans.

Wildlife in cities are more susceptible to suffering ill effects from exposure to toxicants (such as heavy metals and pesticides). In China, fish that were exposed to industrial wastewater had poorer body condition; being exposed to toxicants can increase susceptibility to infection. Humans have the potential to induce patchy food distribution, which can promote animal aggregation by attracting a high number of animals to common food sources; "this aggregation may increase the spread of parasites transmitted through close contact; parasite deposition on soil, water, or artificial feeders; and stress through inter‐ and intraspecific competition." The results of a study performed by Maureen Murray (et al.), in which a phylogenetic meta-analysis of 516 comparisons of overall wildlife condition reported in 106 studies was performed, confirmed these results; "our meta‐analysis suggests an overall negative relationship between urbanization and wildlife health, mainly driven by considerably higher toxicant loads and greater parasite abundance, greater parasite diversity, and/or greater likelihood of infection by parasites transmitted through close contact."

The urban environment can also increase diversity in a number of ways. Many foreign organisms are introduced and dispersed naturally or artificially in urban areas. Artificial introductions may be intentional, where organisms have some form of human use, or accidental, where organisms attach themselves to transportation vehicles. Humans provide food sources (e.g. birdfeeder seeds, trash, garden compost) and reduce the numbers of large natural predators in urban environments, allowing large populations to be supported where food and predation would normally limit the population size. There are a variety of different habitats available within the urban environment as a result of differences in land use allowing for more species to be supported than by more uniform habitats.

=== New species discoveries in cities ===
Urban habitats (e.g. backyards, parks, gardens, botanical gardens, and remnant patches of natural habitat) can yield taxa new to science, showing that species discovery is not confined to remote wildlands. In 2025, several taxa were described from city environments, including the skink Scincella chengduensis and the shrub Euonymus chengduanus from forest remnants in Chengdu, China, the fish Cobitis beijingensis from highly human-altered streams in Beijing, China, the beetle Longitarsus cohongorooto from ruderal ecosystems in the greater Washington, DC region, Punctaltica (a new beetle genus) from a city park in Shenzhen, China, and the leafhopper genus Bamboosella described from several European cities. New species have also been described from heavily urbanized settings, including the spider Loxosceles tenochtitlan from houses in Mexico City, 42 new Megaselia fly species discovered in Los Angeles residential backyards (BioSCAN), the fly Drapetis bruscellensis from the outskirts of Brussels and supported by COI barcoding, and urban-associated taxa from São Paulo, Brazil, including three Mesabolivar spiders from leaf litter and two Drosophila species associated with plant inflorescences in the city. Urban species discovery also includes vertebrates, such as the leopard frog Rana kauffeldi described from New York City and surrounding Atlantic Coast regions, and Zakerana dhaka described from Dhaka, Bangladesh.

=== Behavioural homogenization ===
Urbanization can alter not only which species occur in cities, but also how they behave. Urban environments often favour a recurring suite of traits, sometimes referred to as an 'urban wildlife syndrome', including reduced fear of humans, greater use of anthropogenic food, shifts in daily activity, and increased use of human-made structures. Such repeated shifts may reduce behavioural diversity across individuals, populations, and species - a process termed 'behavioral homogenization' - potentially affecting ecosystem functioning, animal cultures, and human–wildlife interactions.

== Ways to improve urban ecology: civil engineering and sustainability ==
Cities should be planned and constructed in such a way that minimizes the urban effects on the surrounding environment (urban heat island, precipitation, etc.) as well as optimizing ecological activity. For example, increasing the albedo, or reflective power, of surfaces in urban areas, can minimize urban heat island, resulting in a lower magnitude of the urban heat island effect in urban areas. By minimizing these abnormal temperature trends and others, ecological activity would likely be improved in the urban setting.

=== Need for remediation ===
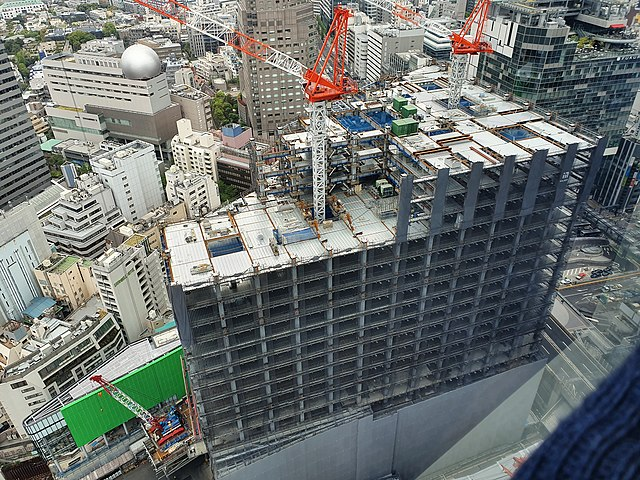
Urbanization taking place in Shibuya

Urbanization has indeed had a profound effect on the environment, on both local and global scales. Difficulties in actively constructing habitat corridors and returning biogeochemical cycles to normal raise the question as to whether such goals are feasible. However, some groups are working to return areas of land affected by the urban landscape to a more natural state. This includes using landscape architecture to model natural systems and restore rivers to pre-urban states.

It is becoming increasingly critical that conservation action be enacted within urban landscapes. Space in cities is limited; urban infill threatens the existence of green spaces. Green spaces that are in close proximity to cities are also vulnerable to urban sprawl. It is common that urban development comes at the cost of valuable land that could host wildlife species. Natural and financial resources are limited; a larger focus must be placed on conservation opportunities that factor in feasibility and maximization of expected benefits. Since the securing of land as a protected area is a luxury that cannot be extensively implemented, alternative approaches must be explored in order to prevent mass extinction of species. Borgström et al. 2006 hold that urban ecosystems are especially prone to "scale mismatch" whereby the right course of action is heavily dependent on species size. For some species conservation can be achieved in a single isolated garden because their small size permits a large population, e.g. soil microorganisms. Meanwhile, that is the wrong scale for species that are more mobile and/or larger, e.g. pollinators and seed dispersers, which will require larger and/or connected spaces.

The need to pursue conservation outcomes in urban environments is most pronounced for species whose global distribution is contained within a human-modified landscape. The fact is that many threatened wildlife species are prevalent among land types that were not originally intended for conservation. Of Australia's 39 urban-restricted threatened species, 11 species occur at roadsides, 10 species occur in private lands, 5 species occur in military lands, 4 species in schools, 4 species in golf courses, 4 species at utility easements (such as railways), 3 species at airports and 1 species at hospitals. The spiked rice flower species pimelea spicata persists mainly at a golf course, while the guinea-flower hibbertia puberula glabrescens is known mainly from the grounds of an airport. Unconventional landscapes as such are the ones that must be prioritized. The goal in the management of these areas is to bring about a "win-win" situation where conservation efforts are practiced while not compromising the original use of the space. While being near to large human populations can pose risks to endangered species inhabiting urban environments, such closeness can prove to be an advantage as long as the human community is conscious and engaged in local conservation efforts.

=== Species reintroduction ===
Reintroduction of species to urban settings can help improve the local biodiversity previously lost; however the following guidelines should be followed in order to avoid undesired effects.

1. No predators capable of killing children will be reintroduced to urban areas.
2. There will be no introduction of species that significantly threaten human health, pets, crops or property.
3. Reintroduction will not be done when it implies significant suffering to the organisms being reintroduced, for example stress from capture or captivity.
4. Organisms that carry pathogens will not be reintroduced.
5. Organisms whose genes threaten the genetic pool of other organisms in the urban area will not be reintroduced.
6. Organisms will only be reintroduced when scientific data support a reasonable chance of long-term survival (if funds are insufficient for the long-term effort, reintroduction will not be attempted).
7. Reintroduced organisms will receive food supplementation and veterinary assistance as needed.
8. Reintroduction will be done in both experimental and control areas to produce reliable assessments (monitoring must continue afterwards to trigger interventions if necessary).
9. Reintroduction must be done in several places and repeated over several years to buffer for stochastic events.
10. People in the areas affected must participate in the decision process, and will receive education to make reintroduction sustainable (but final decisions must be based on objective information gathered according to scientific standards).

=== Sustainability ===
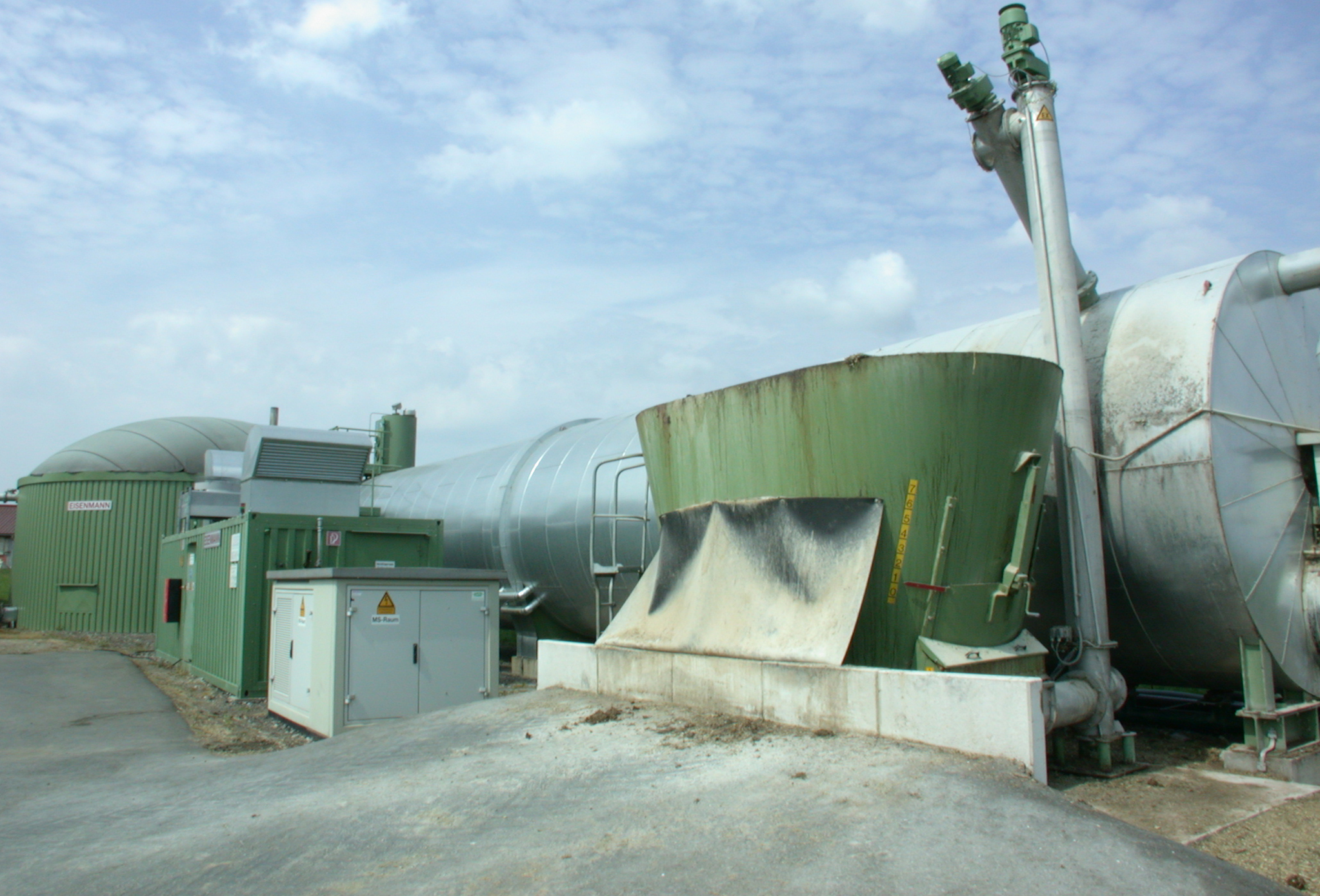
Pipes carrying biogas produced by anaerobic digestion or fermentation of biodegradable materials as a form of carbon sequestration

With the ever-increasing demands for resources necessitated by urbanization, recent campaigns to move toward sustainable energy and resource consumption, such as LEED certification of buildings, Energy Star certified appliances, and zero emission vehicles, have gained momentum. Sustainability reflects techniques and consumption ensuring reasonably low resource use as a component of urban ecology. Techniques such as carbon recapture may also be used to sequester carbon compounds produced in urban centers rather continually emitting more of the greenhouse gas. The use of other types of renewable energy like bioenergy, solar energy, geothermal energy, and wind energy would also help to reduce greenhouse gas emissions.

==== Green Infrastructure Implementation ====
Urban areas can be converted to areas that are more conducive to hosting wildlife through the application of green infrastructure. Although the opportunities of green infrastructure (GI) to benefit human populations have been recognized, there are also opportunities to conserve wildlife diversity. Green infrastructure has the potential to support wildlife robustness by providing a more suitable habitat than conventional, "grey" infrastructure as well as aid in stormwater management and air purification. GI can be defined as features that were engineered with natural elements or natural features. This natural constitution helps prevent wildlife exposure to man-made toxicants. Although research on the benefits of GI on biodiversity has increased exponentially in the last decade, these effects have rarely been quantified. In a study performed by Alessandro Filazzola (et al.), 1,883 published manuscripts were examined and meta-analyzed in reference to 33 relevant studies in order to determine the effect of GI on wildlife. Although there was variability in the findings, it was determined that the implementation of GI improved biodiversity compared to conventional infrastructure. In some cases, GI even preserved comparable measures of biodiversity to natural components.

=== Urban green space ===
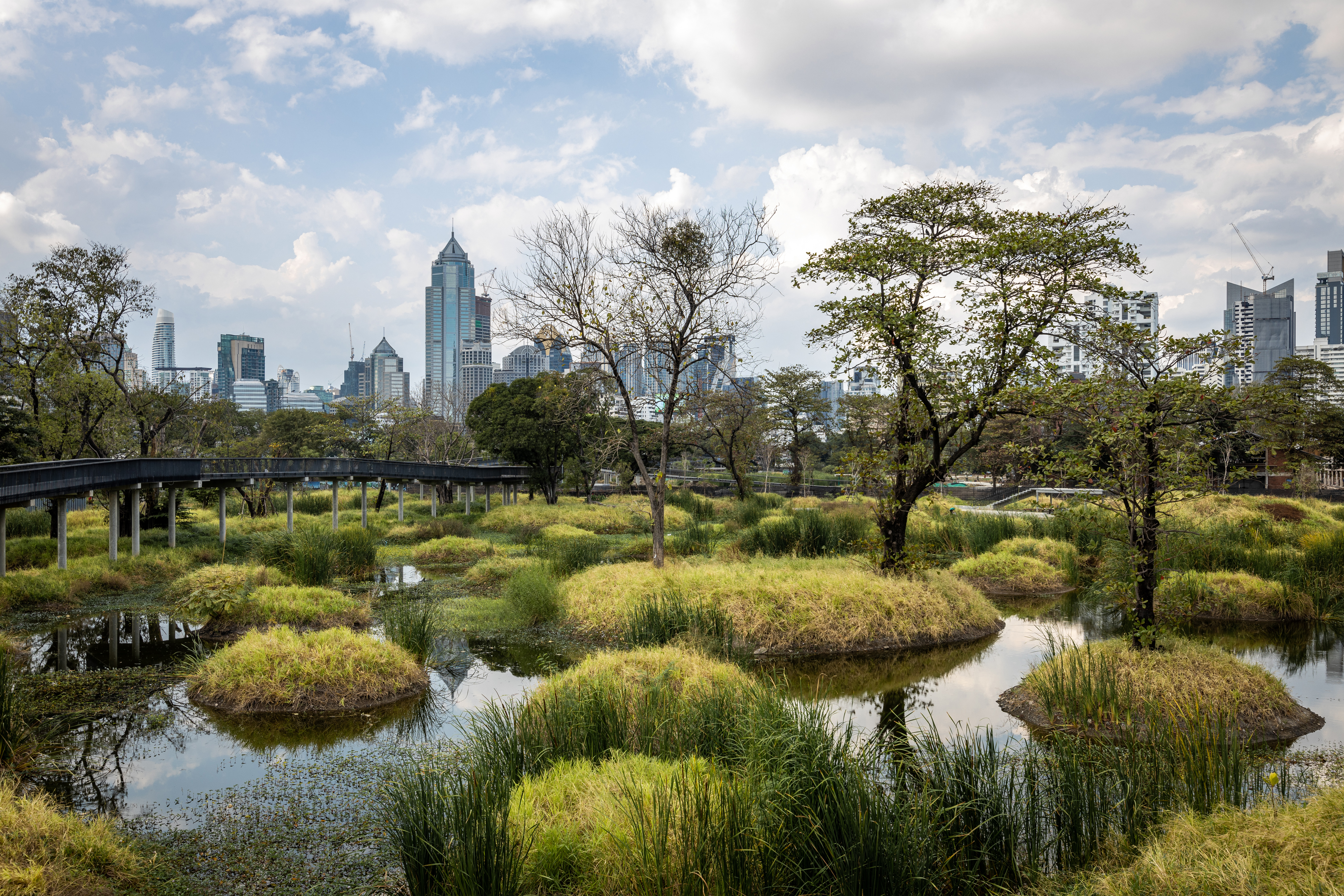
Benjakitti Park in Bangkok

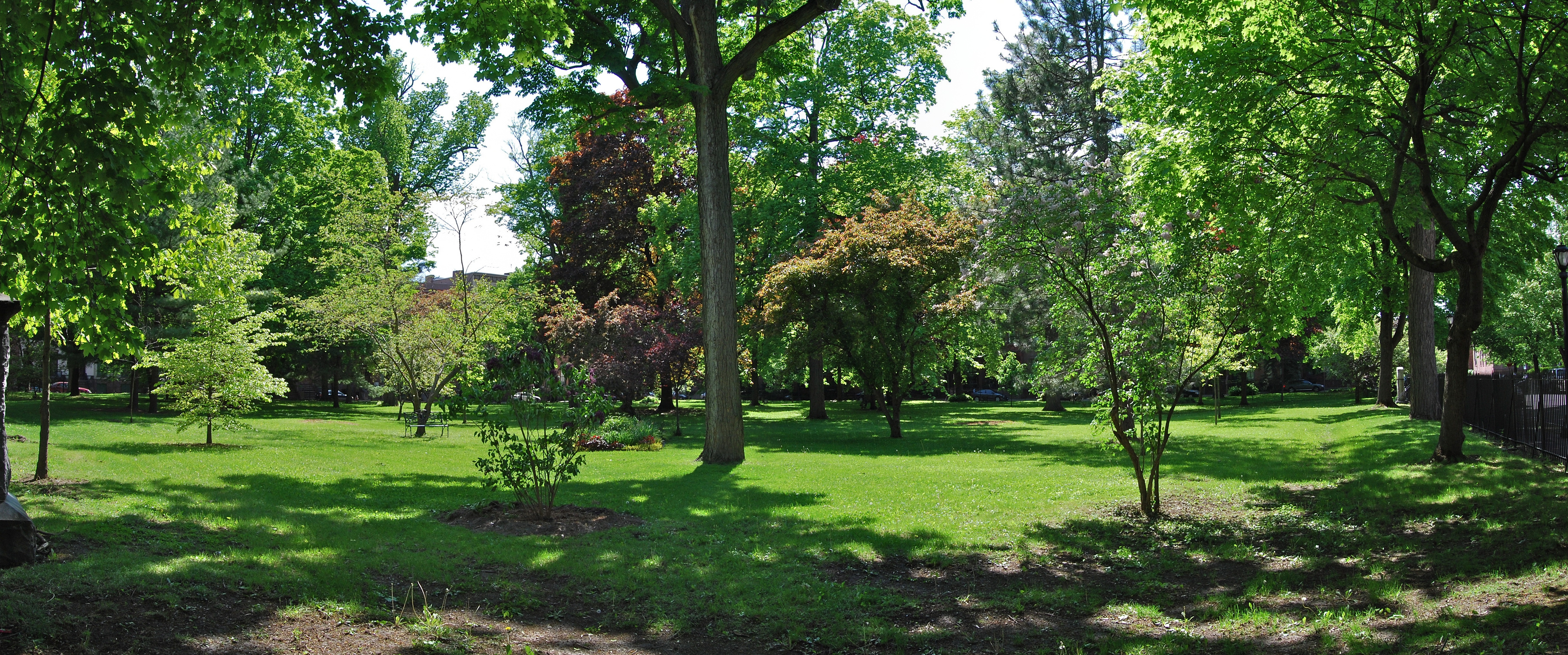
Washington Park in Troy, NY, U.S, an example of privately owned urban open space.

In land-use planning, urban green spaces are open-space areas reserved for parks and other spaces of greenery. These include plant life, water features – also known as blue spaces – and other kinds of natural environments. Most urban open spaces are green spaces, though some may consist of other types of open areas. The landscape of open spaces in urban areas can range from playing fields and other highly maintained environments to more natural landscapes that appear less managed.

Urban green spaces may also include areas that are not publicly accessible, such as privately owned higher education campuses, school sports fields, allotments, neighborhood or community parks and gardens, and corporate campuses. Areas outside city boundaries, such as state and national parks or rural open spaces, are not generally considered urban open spaces. Boulevards, piazzas, plazas, and urban squares are not consistently classified as urban open spaces in land-use planning.

Urban greening policies help revitalize communities, reduce financial burdens on healthcare, and improve quality of life. By promoting the development of parks, green roofs, and community gardens, these policies contribute to cleaner air, mitigate urban heat effects, and create spaces for recreation and social interaction. Most policies focus on community benefits and reducing negative effects of urban development, such as surface runoff and the urban heat island effect. Historically, access to urban green space has favored wealthier and more privileged communities. Recent urban greening has increasingly focused on environmental justice concerns and community engagement in the greening process. In particular, in cities with economic decline, such as in the Rust Belt in the United States, urban greening has broad community revitalization impacts. Urban green spaces have been shown to have a wide-reaching positive impact on the health of individuals and communities near said green space.

A barrier associated with finding the right amount of urban green space is the variety of space needed by different species to complete their life cycles. This is also compounded with the man-made barriers neighboring green spaces that can restrict movement of certain species from other urban green spaces located nearby.

Increasing Wildlife Habitat Connectivity

The implementation of wildlife corridors throughout urban areas (and in between wildlife areas) would promote wildlife habitat connectivity. Habitat connectivity is critical for ecosystem health and wildlife conservation yet is being compromised by increasing urbanization. Urban development has caused green spaces to become increasingly fragmented and has caused adverse effects in genetic variation within species, population abundance and species richness. Urban green spaces that are linked by ecosystem corridors have higher ecosystem health and resilience to global environmental change. Employment of corridors can form an ecosystem network that facilitates movement and dispersal. However, planning these networks requires a comprehensive spatial plan.

One approach is to target "shrinking" cities (such as Detroit, Michigan, USA) that have an abundance of vacant lots and land that could be repurposed into greenways to provide ecosystem services (although even cities with growing populations typically have vacant land as well). However, even cities with high vacancy rates sometimes can present social and environmental challenges. For instance, vacant land that stands on polluted soils may contain heavy metals or construction debris; this must be addressed before the repurposing. Once land has been repurposed for ecosystem services, avenues must be pursued that could allow this land to contribute to structural or functional connectivity.

Structural connectivity refers to parts of the landscape that are physically connected. Functional connectivity refers to species-specific tendencies that indicate interaction with other parts of the landscape. Throughout the City of Detroit, spatial patterns were detected that could promote structural connectivity. The research performed by Zhang "integrates landscape ecology and graph theory, spatial modeling, and landscape design to develop a methodology for planning multifunctional green infrastructure that fosters social-ecological sustainability and resilience". Using a functional connectivity index, there was found to be a high correlation between these results (structural and functional connectivity), suggesting that the two metrics could be indicators of each other and could guide green space planning.

Although urban wildlife corridors could serve as a potential mitigation tool, it is important that they are constructed so as to facilitate wildlife movement without restriction. As humans may be perceived as a threat, the success of the corridors is dependent on human population density proximity to roads. In a study performed by Tempe Adams (et al.), remote-sensor camera traps and data from GPS collars were utilized to assess whether or not the African elephant would use narrow urban wildlife corridors. The study was performed in three different urban-dominated land use types (in Botswana, South Africa) over a span of two years.

The results of the study indicated that elephants tended to move through unprotected areas more quickly, spending less time in those areas. Using vehicular traffic as a measure of human activity, the study indicated that elephant presence was higher during times when human activity was at a minimum. It was determined that "formal protection and designation of urban corridors by the relevant governing bodies would facilitate coexistence between people and wildlife at small spatial scales." However, the only way this co-existence could be feasible is by creating structural connectivity (and thus promoting functional connectivity) by implementing proper wildlife corridors that facilitate easy movement between habitat patches. The usage of green infrastructure that is connected to natural habitats has been shown to reap greater biodiversity benefits than GI implemented in areas far from natural habitats. GI close to natural areas may also increase functional connectivity in natural environments.

Roadkill Mitigation

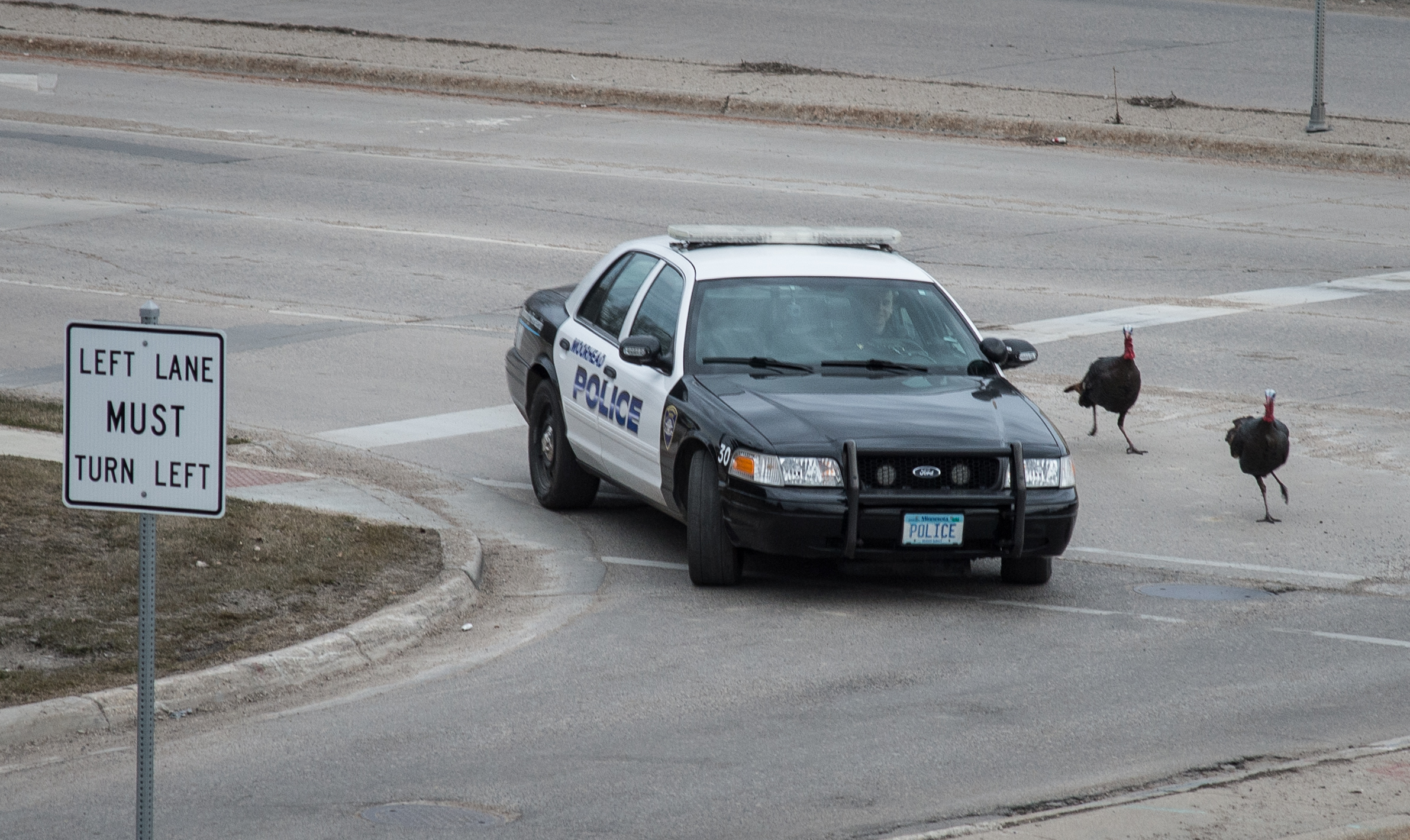
Turkeys on a Moorhead, Minnesota road

In the United States, roadkill takes the lives of hundreds of thousands to hundreds of millions of mammals, birds and amphibians each year. Roadkill mortality has detrimental effects on the persistence probability, abundance and genetic diversity of wildlife populations (more so than reduced movement through habitat patches). Roadkill also has an effect on driver safety. If green areas cannot be reserved, the presence of wildlife habitats in close proximity to urban roads must be addressed. The optimal situation would be to avoid constructing roads next to these natural habitats, but other preventative measures can be pursued to reduce animal mortality. One way these effects could be mitigated is through implementation of wildlife fencing in prioritized areas. Many countries utilize underpasses and overpasses combined with wildlife fencing to reduce roadkill mortality in an attempt to restore habitat connectivity. It is unrealistic to try to fence entire road networks because of financial constraints. Therefore, areas in which the highest rates of mortality occur should be focused on.

=== Indigenous knowledge ===
Urban sprawl is one of many ways that Indigenous people's land is taken and developed in cities of the global north, thus the intimate knowledge of the native area (ecology) is often lost due to the effects of colonization or because the land has been majorly altered. Urban development occurs around areas where Indigenous Peoples lived as these areas are easy for transport and the natural environmental is fruitful. When developing areas of urban land, consideration should go towards the intimate levels of knowledge held by Indigenous Peoples and the biocultural and linguistic diversity of the place. Urban ecology follows western science frameworks and compartmentalizes nature. Urban ecology has the opportunity to be viewed in an interconnected and holistic way, through "Two-Eyed Seeing" and be inclusive of the Traditional Ecological Knowledge held by the local Indigenous Peoples of the area.

Urban restoration ecology would be enriched by partnerships with the local Indigenous Peoples, if done in a respectful way that addresses the currently inequitable relationship. Non-indigenous people can support their local Indigenous communities by learning about the history of the land and ecosystems that is being restored or studied. Ecological restoration built with strong Indigenous partnerships benefits the Indigenous culture and identity, as well as all urban dwellers.

== Summary ==
Urbanization results in a series of both local and far-reaching effects on biodiversity, biogeochemical cycles, hydrology, and climate, among other stresses. Many of these effects are not fully understood, as urban ecology has only recently emerged as a scientific discipline and more research remains to be done. Research on cities outside the US and Europe remains limited. Observations on the impact of urbanization on biodiversity and species interactions are consistent across many studies but definitive mechanisms have yet to be established. Urban ecology constitutes an important and highly relevant subfield of ecology, and further study must be pursued to more fully understand the effects of human urban areas on the environment.

== See also ==
- Blue space
- Carbon dioxide
- Circles of Sustainability
- Climate change
- Green track
- Greenway (landscape)
- Habitat
- Landscape ecology
- Settlement geography
- Urban economics
- Urban forest inequity
- Urban forest
- Urban forestry
- Urban geography
- Urban green space
- Urban park
- Urban studies
- Urban rewilding
- Urban wildlife
- Wildlife corridor
- Zebra mussel
