= Herbert Sukopp =

German ecologist (1930–2026)

Herbert Sukopp (6 November 1930 – 3 February 2026) was a German ecologist. From 1974 to 1996, he was professor and head of the department of Ecosystem Research and Vegetation Science at the Institute of Ecology at the Technische Universität Berlin.

== Life and career ==
Sukopp was born in Berlin on 6 November 1930. He obtained his doctorate in 1958 from the Free University of Berlin under supervision of Erich Werdermann. In 1968, he obtained his habilitation in botany. In 1969, he became professor at the Technische Universität Berlin. In 1974, Sukopp became full professor and head of the department of Ecosystem Research and Vegetation Science at the Institute of Ecology at the same university. He held this position until 1996.

He is noted as the founder of the Berlin School of urban ecology. He was honorary president of the Society for Urban Ecology.

In 1983, Sukopp received the Cross of Merit of the Order of Merit of the Federal Republic of Germany. In 1995, he became an extraordinary member of the Berlin-Brandenburg Academy of Sciences and Humanities.

Sukopp died on 3 February 2026, at the age of 95.
