= Galdi, Cameroon =

Galdi
- Location within Cameroon
- Coordinates: 7°05′N 13°51′E
- Country: Cameroon
- Region: Adamawa
- Department: Vina

Population (2005)
  - Total: 1,529

Galdi (or Galde) is a village in the commune of Nyambaka, in the Adamawa Region of Cameroon, in the south-eastern part of the Adamawa Plateau.

== Population ==
In 1967, Galdi had 182 inhabitants, mainly Fula people.

At the time of the 2005 census, there were 1529 people in the village.

There is a Sunday market in the village.

== Rock art ==
A site with rock art has been discovered in the vicinity of the village, with more than 150 motifs, including stylised metal weapons, arrangements of cups, and other unidentified signs.

== Bibliography ==
- Jean Boutrais (ed.), Peuples et cultures de l'Adamaoua (Cameroun) : actes du colloque de Ngaoundéré, du 14 au 16 janvier 1992, ORSTOM, Paris; Ngaoundéré-Anthropos, 1993, 316 p. ISBN 2-7099-1167-1
- Dictionnaire des villages de l'Adamaoua, ONAREST, Yaoundé, October 1974, 133 p.
- Narcisse Santores Tchandeu, « Découverte d’un site d’art rupestre à Galdi au moyen Cameroun », in Afrique : Archéologie & Arts, No. 5, 2009, p. 173-179.
