= Vincenzo Galdi (academic) =

Italian electrical engineer and academic (born 1970)

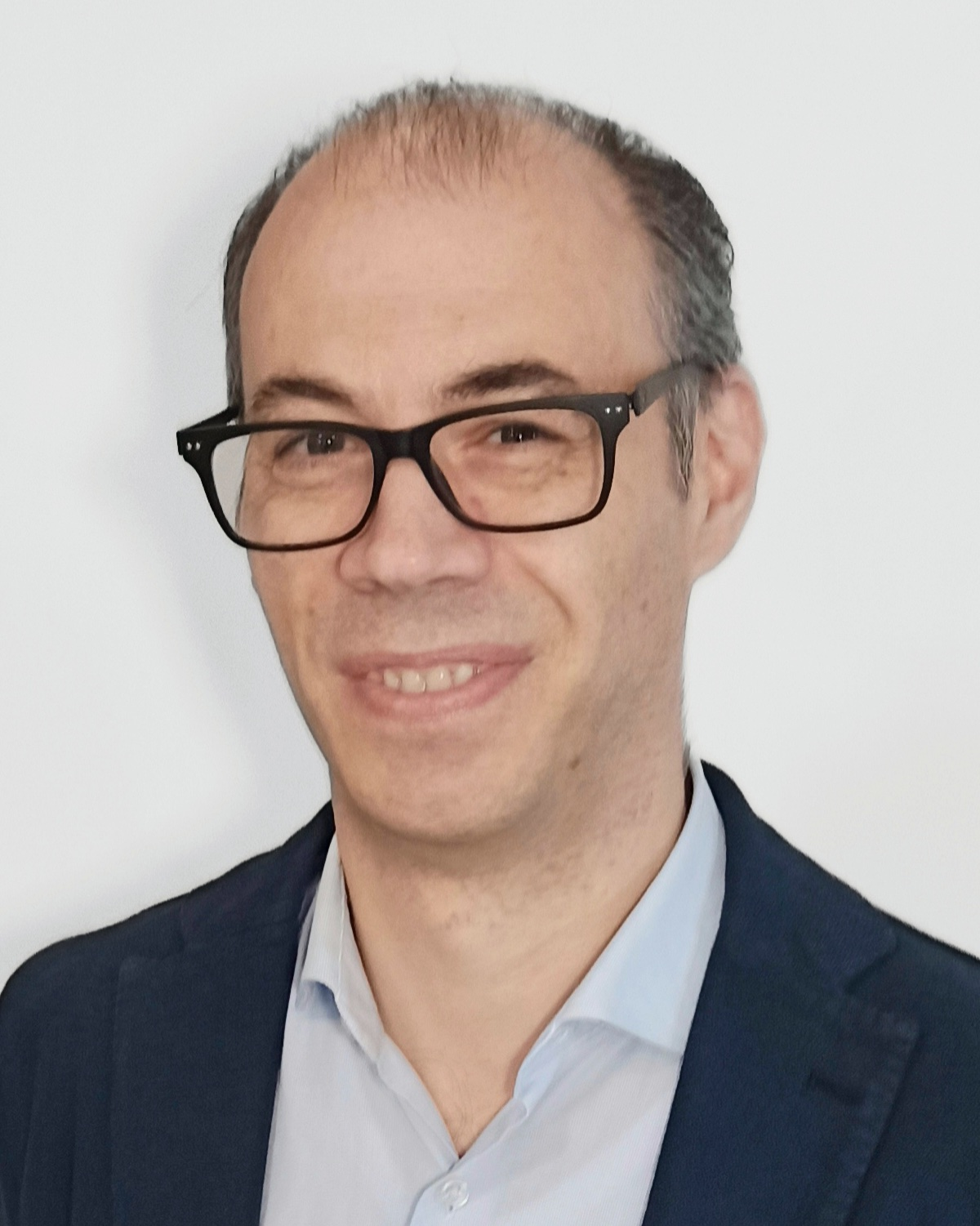
- Professor Vincenzo Galdi
- Born: July 28, 1970 (age 56); Salerno, Italy
- Education: University of Salerno
- Known for: Metamaterial-based analog computing, non-Hermitian optics, space-time metasurfaces
- Awards: Fellow of IEEE (2016), Fellow of Optica (2022), Fellow of APS (2025)
- Scientific career
- Fields: Applied electromagnetics, metamaterials, wave-matter interaction
- Workplaces: University of Sannio
- Website: fw-lab.org

Vincenzo Galdi (born July 28, 1970, in Salerno, Italy) is an Italian electrical engineer and academic, internationally recognized for his work in applied electromagnetics and metamaterials. He is currently a Professor of Electromagnetics at the University of Sannio in Benevento, Italy. Galdi is a Fellow of the Institute of Electrical and Electronics Engineers (IEEE), of Optica (formerly OSA), and of the American Physical Society (APS), and a senior member of the LIGO Scientific Collaboration.

== Education and career ==
Galdi earned a Laurea degree (summa cum laude) in Electrical Engineering from the University of Salerno in 1995, and a PhD in Applied Electromagnetics from the same institution in 1999. From 1999 to 2002, he was a Postdoctoral Research Associate at Boston University.

Since 2002, he has been a professor at the Department of Engineering of the University of Sannio, where he leads the Fields & Waves Laboratory. He has also held visiting appointments at the European Space Research and Technology Centre (ESTEC), the Massachusetts Institute of Technology, the California Institute of Technology, and the University of Texas at Austin.

== Research ==
Galdi's research focuses on electromagnetic wave interactions with complex and engineered media, including metamaterials, photonic quasicrystals, and space-time metastructures. His work spans non-Hermitian physics, aperiodically ordered media, and time-varying systems, with applications in wireless communication, sensing, and analog computing.

Notable contributions include:

- Analog computing with metamaterials: Co-authored a Science paper regarded as a foundational work in the field, demonstrating how metamaterials can perform mathematical operations and inspiring widespread theoretical and experimental advancements.
- Space-time modulated and chaotic metasurfaces: Developed new metastructures enabling direct physical-layer secure communication, integrated sensing and communications (ISAC), and nonreciprocal signal control, with implications for next-generation wireless systems.
- Photonic quasicrystals: Contributed to the understanding of bandgap formation, wave localization, and guided resonances in aperiodically ordered media.
- Non-Hermitian optics: Advanced the basic understanding of the complex interplay between gain and loss in engineered materials, leading to novel waveguiding mechanisms and spatial control strategies including non-Hermitian doping.
- LIGO experiment: Participated in the development of low-thermal-noise, high-reflectivity coatings for optical mirrors, critical to the sensitivity of the interferometers used in the first direct detection of gravitational waves.

== Honors and awards ==
- Fellow of IEEE (2016) – For "contributions to modeling the interaction between electromagnetic waves and complex materials."
- Fellow of Optica (2022) – For "outstanding and sustained contributions to modeling wave interaction with artificially engineered materials, including nonlocal, non-Hermitian, multiphysics, and time-varying scenarios."
- Fellow of APS (2025) – For "important contributions to the modeling of wave interactions with complex media and metamaterials, and the design of low-thermal-noise optical coatings for gravitational wave interferometry."

== Selected publications ==
- A. Silva et al., "Performing mathematical operations with metamaterials," Science, vol. 343, no. 6167, pp. 160–163, 2014.
- M. Wei et al., "Metasurface-enabled smart wireless attacks at the physical layer," Nature Electronics, vol. 6, no. 8, pp. 610–618, 2023.
- G. Castaldi et al., "PT metamaterials via complex-coordinate transformation optics," Physical Review Letters, vol. 110, no. 17, 173901, 2013.
- D. V. Martynov et al., "Sensitivity of the Advanced LIGO detectors...," Physical Review D, vol. 93, no. 11, 112004, 2016.
- L. Zhang et al., "Space-time-coding digital metasurfaces," Nature Communications, vol. 9, p. 4334, 2018.
