= Antonio Galdo =

Antonio Galdo (born 17 October 1957 in Naples) is an Italian writer and journalist.

== Biography ==
He has collaborated with several publications such as Panorama, Economy, Il Mattino, L'Indipendente, Il Messaggero, Corriere Adriatico..., in television with RAI, and since 2009 with the website Non Sprecare.

== Works ==
- Denaro Contante, Rizzoli, 1990
- Intervista a Giuseppe De Rita sulla borghesia in Italia, Laterza, 1996
- Ospedale Italia, Il Saggiatore, 1998
- Guai a chi li tocca. L'Italia in ostaggio delle corporazioni: dai medici ai ferrovieri, dai gondolieri ai magistrati, Mondadori, 2000
- Capolinea a Nordest, con Giuseppe De Rita, Marsilio, 2001
- Saranno potenti? Storia, declino e nuovi protagonisti della classe dirigente italiana, Sperling & Kupfer, 2003
- Pietro Ingrao, il compagno disarmato, Sperling & Kupfer, 2004
- Fabbriche. Storie, personaggi e luoghi di una passione italiana, Einaudi, 2007
- Non Sprecare, Einaudi, 2008
- Basta Poco, Einaudi, 2011
- L’eclissi della borghesia, with Giuseppe De Rita, Laterza, 2011
- Non Sprecare edizione tascabile, Einaudi, 2012
