= Rosine de Chabaud-Latour =

French religious thinker and translator

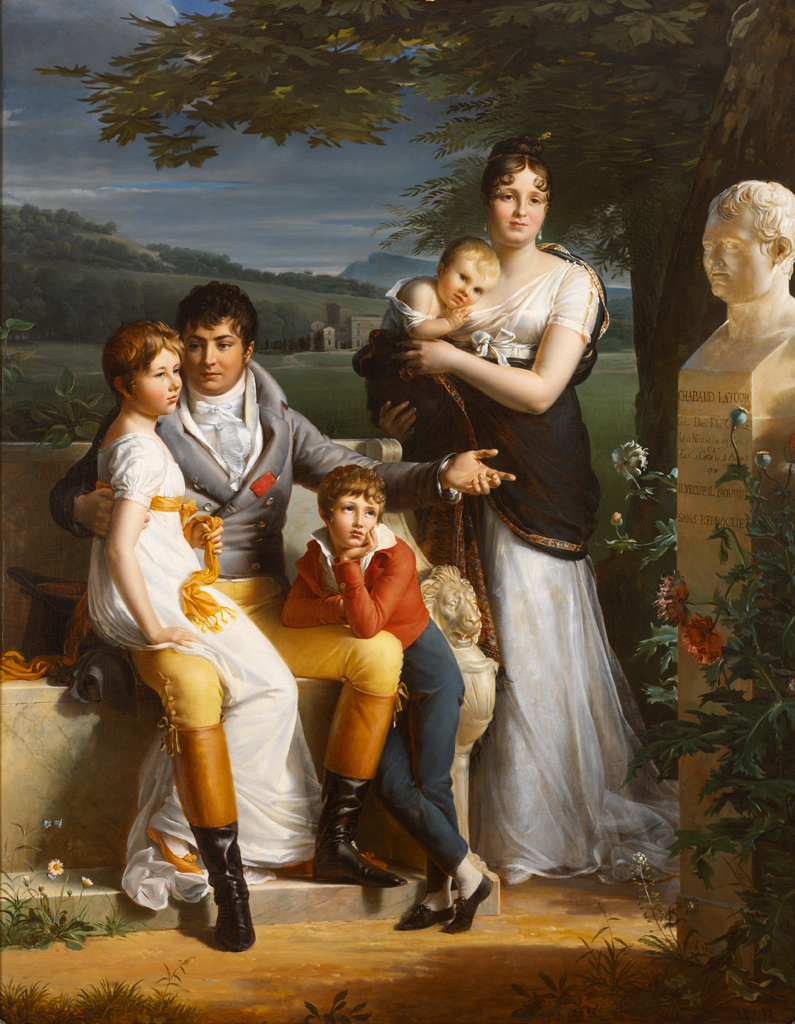
- Rosine (left) with her family in 1806
- Born: Suzanne Rosette de Chabaud-Latour; 15 September 1794; Nîmes, French Republic
- Died: 28 May 1860 (aged 65); Paris, Kingdom of France
- Relatives: François de Chabaud-Latour (brother)
- Writing career
- Language: French
- Genre: Christian literature

Suzanne Rosette de Chabaud-Latour, known as Rosine de Chabaud-Latour, (15 September 1794 – 28 May 1860) was a French religious thinker and translator. The daughter of an engineer who had served Napoleon, she was a prominent member of the protestant church in Nîmes and Paris. She translated the writing of English-speaking religious writers of the time, Thomas Adam, John Newton and William Romaine, into French, and her writing and thoughts were important to the development of protestant religious thinking in France during the Réveil. She was governess to François Guizot's children, including his daughter Henriette who later also became a writer and translator.

== Biography ==
Suzanne Rosette de Chabaud-Latour was born in Nîmes in the French Republic on 15 September 1794, the daughter of Antoine de Chabaud-Latour and Julie Verdier de Lacoste. Her father had served as an engineer to Napoleon and had been made a baron by Louis XVIII. He was a friend of François Guizot, and, in November 1805, she became governess to Guizot's children, including Henriette who also became a writer and translator.

Growing up in a prominent protestant family, the young de Chabaud-Latour saw the consequences of the failure of the deistic Cult of the Supreme Being that had been propagated by Maximilien Robespierre and the Cult of Reason during the French Revolution. At a young age, she moved to Paris and connected with many of the leading Christian thinkers of her time, including those from England. Her thoughts and writing were important to the development of religious thought during the Réveil which spread through parts of the French church. She looked at the experience of the Great Awakening and similar movements as models for her theology, particularly the works of John Newton, the ex-slave trader whose life transformation was embodied in the song Amazing Grace, and Thomas Adam's Private Thoughts on Religion. She translated the writings of Adam, Newton and others into French and died in Paris on 28 May 1860.

== Selected writings ==
Omicron, ou Quarante-une lettres sur des sujets religieux, per J Newton, traduit de l'anglais, 1830.
Cardiphonia, ou Correspondance de J. Newton, Recteur de Saint-Mary-Woolnoth: traduit de l'anglais par le traducteur d'Omicron, 1831.
Correspondance du Rév. J. Newton et de Miss Hannah More, traduite de l'anglais par le traducteur d'Omicron, 1840.
Vie de Madame Isabella Graham, 1850.
Pensées chrétiennes, extraites du journal du Révérend Thomas Adam, recteur de Wintringham; traduites de l'anglais par le traducteur d'Omicron et de Cardiphonia, 1856.
Christ tout en tous, pensées pieuses extraites des ouvrages du Révérend William Romaine, et précédées d'une notice sur sa vie. C'est moi, ou la Voix de Jésus au milieu de la tempête, par Newman Hall, 1858.
