= French Revolution of 1848 =

Civil unrest in Paris, France

- Part of the Revolutions of 1848
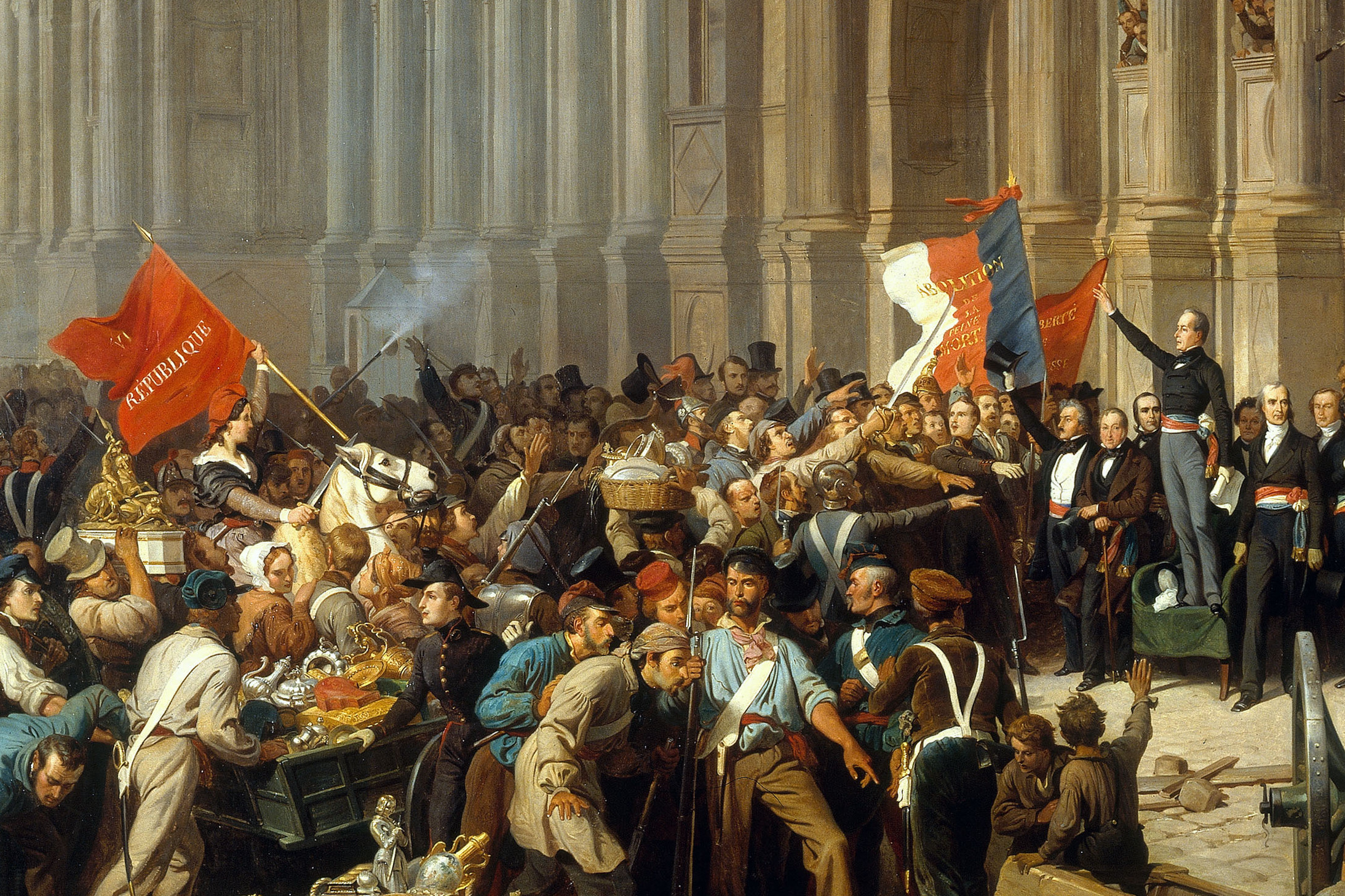
- Detail from Lamartine Rejecting the Red Flag in Front of the City Hall by Henri Félix Emmanuel Philippoteaux
- Date: 22–24 February 1848
- Location: Paris, France
- Result: Abdication of King Louis Philippe; Abolition of the monarchy; Establishment of the republic under a provisional government

Parties
Revolutionaries: Civilian protesters; National Guard defectors	Kingdom of France: French Army; Municipal Guard

Lead figures
Non-centralized leadership	Louis Philippe I François Guizot; Thomas Robert Bugeaud

The French Revolution of 1848 (French: Révolution française de 1848), also known as the February Revolution (Révolution de février), was a period of civil unrest in France, in February 1848, that led to the collapse of the July Monarchy and the foundation of the French Second Republic. It sparked the wave of revolutions of 1848.

The revolution took place in Paris, and was preceded by the French government's crackdown on the campagne des banquets. Starting on 22 February as a large-scale protest against the government of François Guizot, it later developed into a violent uprising against the monarchy. After intense urban fighting, large crowds managed to take control of the capital, leading to the abdication of King Louis Philippe I on 24 February and the subsequent proclamation of the Second Republic.

== Background ==
Under the Charter of 1814, Louis XVIII ruled France as the head of a constitutional monarchy. Upon Louis XVIII's death, his brother, the Count of Artois, ascended to the throne in 1824, as Charles X. Supported by the ultra-royalists, Charles X was an extremely unpopular reactionary monarch whose aspirations were far more grand than those of his deceased brother. He had no desire to rule as a constitutional monarch, taking various steps to strengthen his own authority as monarch and weaken that of the lower house.

In 1830, Charles X, presumably persuaded by one of his chief advisers, Jules, Prince de Polignac, issued the Four Ordinances of St. Cloud. These ordinances abolished freedom of the press, reduced the electorate by 75%, and dissolved the lower house. This action provoked an immediate reaction from the citizenry, who revolted against the monarchy during the Three Glorious Days of 26–29 July 1830. Charles was forced to abdicate the throne and to flee Paris for the United Kingdom. As a result, Louis Philippe, of the Orléanist branch, rose to power, replacing the old Charter by the Charter of 1830, and his rule became known as the July Monarchy.

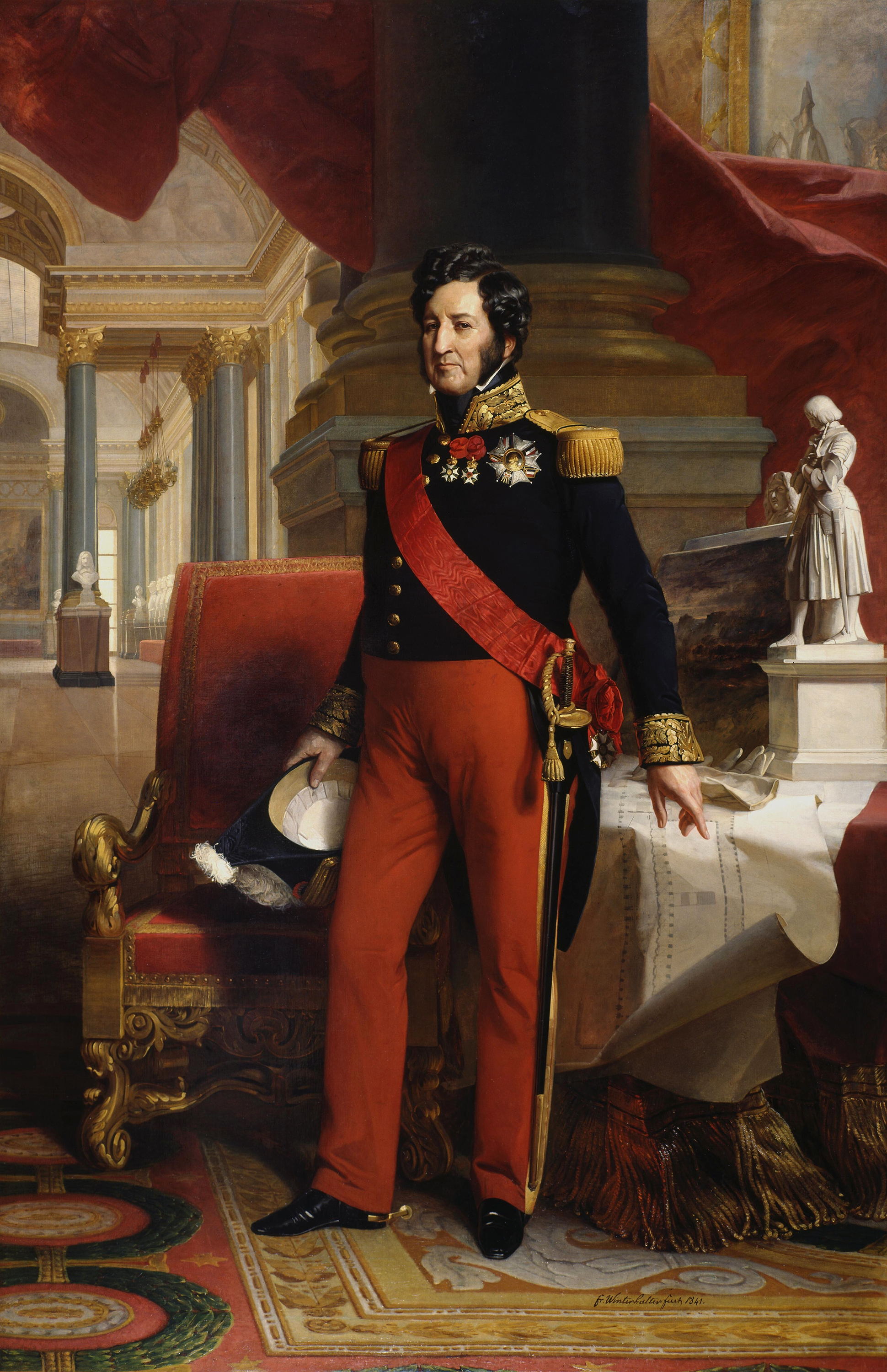
Portrait of Louis Philippe I by Franz Xaver Winterhalter, 1841 Louis Philippe I, the last King of the French, was overthrown in 1848

Nicknamed the "Bourgeois Monarch", Louis Philippe sat at the head of a moderately liberal state controlled mainly by an educated elite. He was supported by the Orléanists and opposed on his right by the Legitimists (former ultra-royalists) and on his left by the Republicans. Louis Philippe was an expert businessman and, by means of his businesses, he had become one of the richest men in France. Louis Philippe saw himself as the successful embodiment of a "small businessman" (petit bourgeois). He and his government did not look with favor on the big business (bourgeoisie), especially the industrial section of the French bourgeoisie, yet Louis Philippe did support the bankers, large and small. At the beginning of his reign in 1830, Jacques Laffitte, a banker and liberal politician who supported Louis Philippe's rise to the throne, said "From now on, the bankers will rule."

During the reign of Louis Philippe, the privileged "financial aristocracy", i.e. bankers, stock exchange magnates, railroad barons, owners of coal mines, iron ore mines, and forests and all landowners associated with them, tended to support him, while the industrial section of the bourgeoisie, which may have owned the land their factories sat on but not much more, were disfavored by Louis Philippe and actually tended to side with the middle class and laboring class in opposition to Louis Philippe in the Chamber of Deputies. Land-ownership was favored, and this elitism resulted in the disenfranchisement of much of the middle and working classes.

By 1848, only about one percent of the population held the franchise. Although France had a free press and trial by jury, only landholders were permitted to vote, which alienated the petite bourgeoisie and even the industrial bourgeoisie from the government. Louis Philippe was viewed as generally indifferent to the needs of society, especially to those members of the middle class who were excluded from the political arena. Early in 1848, some Orléanist liberals, such as Adolphe Thiers, had turned against Louis Philippe, disappointed by his opposition to parliamentarism. A reform movement developed in France which urged the government to expand the electoral franchise, just as Great Britain had done with the Reform Act 1832. The more radical democrats of the reform movement coalesced around the newspaper, La Réforme; the more moderate republicans and the liberal opposition rallied around the Le National newspaper. Starting in July 1847 the reformists of all shades began to hold "banquets" at which toasts were drunk to "République française" (the French Republic), "Liberté, égalité, fraternité", etc. Louis Philippe turned a deaf ear to the reform movement, and discontent among wide sections of the French people continued to grow.

Alexis de Tocqueville observed, "We are sleeping together in a volcano. ... A wind of revolution blows, the storm is on the horizon." Lacking the property qualifications to vote, the lower classes were about to erupt in revolt.

=== Economic and international influences ===
The French middle class watched changes in Britain with interest. When Britain's Reform Act 1832 extended enfranchisement to any man paying taxes of £10 or more per year (equivalent to £1,000 in 2025, previously the vote was restricted to landholders), France's free press took interest. Meanwhile, economically, the French working class may perhaps have been slightly better off than Britain's working class. Still, unemployment in France threw skilled workers down to the level of the proletariat. The only nominally social law of the July Monarchy was passed in 1841. This law prohibited the use of labor of children under eight years of age, and the employment of children less than 13 years old for night-time work. This law was routinely flouted.

The year 1846 saw a financial crisis and bad harvests, and the following year saw an economic depression. A poor railway system hindered aid efforts, and the peasant rebellions that resulted were forcibly crushed. According to French economist Frédéric Bastiat, the poor condition of the railway system can largely be attributed to French efforts to promote other systems of transport, such as carriages. Perhaps a third of Paris was on social welfare. Writers such as Louis Blanc ("The right to work") and Pierre-Joseph Proudhon ("Property is theft!") proliferated.

Bastiat, who was one of the most famous political writers of the 1840s, had written countless works concerning the economic situation before 1848, and provided a different explanation of why the French people were forced to rise in the revolt. He believed that the main reasons were primarily political corruption, along with its very complex system of monopolies, permits, and bureaucracy, which made those who were able to obtain political favors unjustly privileged and able to dictate the market conditions and caused a myriad of businesses to collapse, as well as protectionism which was the basis for the French foreign trade at the time, and which caused businesses along the Atlantic coast to file for bankruptcy, along with the one owned by Bastiat's family. Indeed, most of Bastiat's early works concern the situation in Bayonne and Bordeaux, two large merchant harbors before the Napoleonic Wars, gradually devastated first by Napoleon I's continental blockade, and later by the protectionist legislation of the nineteenth century. According to Bastiat's biographer, G.C. Roche, just prior to the revolution, 100,000 citizens of Lyon were described as "indigent" and by 1840 there were at least 130,000 abandoned children in France. International markets were not similarly troubled at the time, which Bastiat attributed to the freedom of trade. Indeed, a large part of French economic problems in the 1830s and 1840s were caused by the shortage and unnaturally high prices of different products which could have easily been imported from other countries, such as textiles, machines, tools, and ores, but doing so was either outright illegal at the time or unprofitable due to the system of punitive tariffs.

Bastiat has also noted that the French legislators were entirely unaware of the reality and the effects of their radical policies. One of the members of the French Chamber of Deputies reportedly received a standing ovation when he proposed that the depression of 1847 was due primarily to "external weakness" and "idle pacifism". Nationalist tendencies caused France to severely restrict all international contacts with the United Kingdom, including the ban on importing tea, perceived as destructive to the French national spirit. As the United Kingdom was the largest economy in the world in the nineteenth century, France deprived itself of its most important economic partner, one that could have supplied France with what it lacked and bought surplus French goods.

Such governmental policies and obliviousness to the real reasons of economic troubles were, according to Bastiat, the main causes of the French Revolution of the 1848 and the rise of socialists and anarchists in the years preceding the revolution itself.

Because political gatherings and demonstrations were outlawed in France, activists of the largely middle class opposition to the government began to hold a series of fund-raising banquets. This campaign of banquets (campagne des banquets), was intended to circumvent the governmental restriction on political meetings and provide a legal outlet for popular criticism of the regime. The campaign began in July 1847. Friedrich Engels was in Paris dating from October 1847 and was able to observe and attend some of these banquets. He wrote a series of articles on them, including "The Reform Movement in France" which was published in La Réforme on 20 November 1847; "Split in the Camp—the Réforme and the National—March of Democracy" published in The Northern Star on 4 December 1847; "Reform Banquet at Lille—Speech of LeDru-Rollin" published in The Northern Star on 16 December 1847; "Reform Movement in France—Banquet of Dijon" published in The Northern Star on 18 December 1847; "The Réforme and the National" published in the Deutsche-Brüsseler-Zeitung on 30 December 1847; and "Louis Blanc's Speech at the Dijon Banquet" published in the Deutsche-Brusseler-Zeitung on 30 December 1847.

On 14 January 1848, ahead of the highly awaited next banquet in Paris, the government of prime minister François Guizot outlawed it. Nonetheless, the banquet's organizers decided that it would still be held, alongside a political demonstration, and scheduled it for 22 February.

== Revolution ==
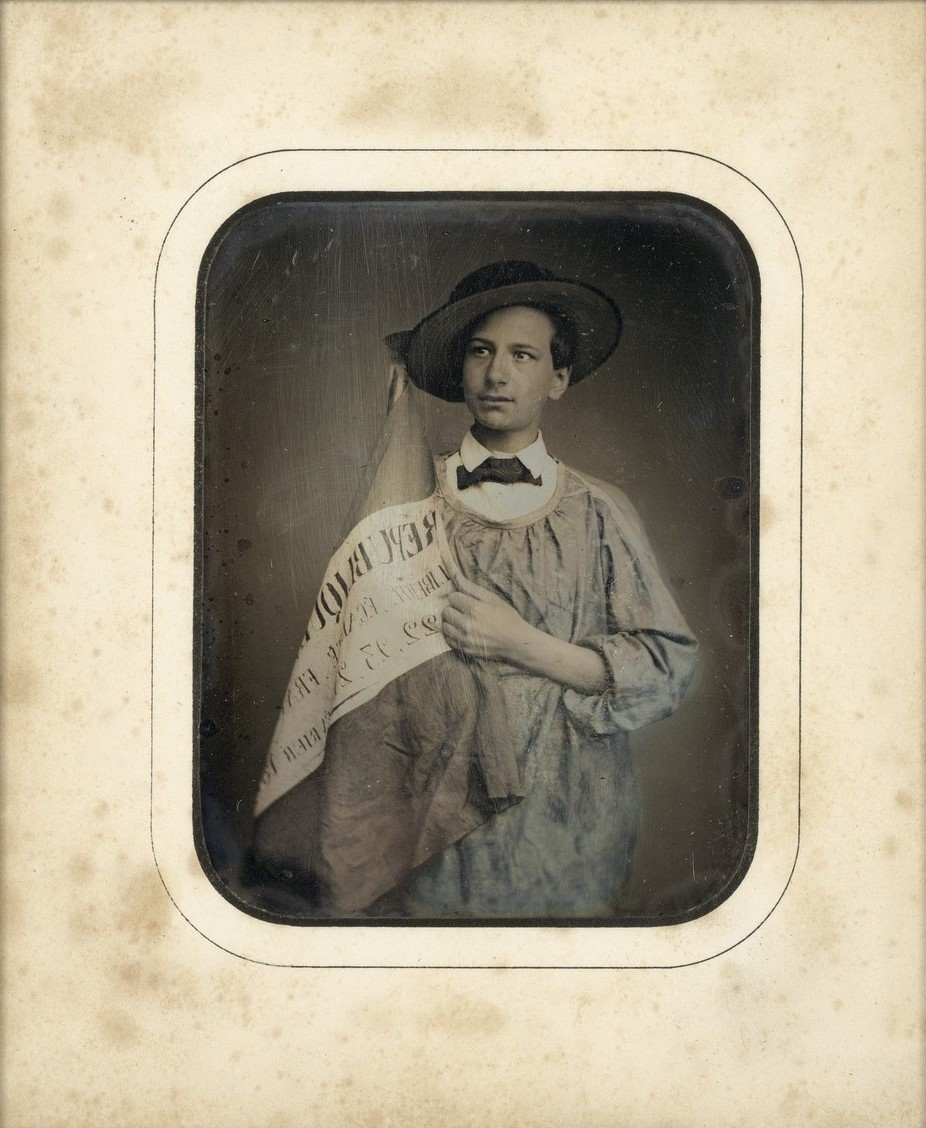
Daguerreotype of a French revolutionary (1848) carrying a tricolor flag that reads: République Liberté Egalité Fraternité 22, 23, 24 février ("Republic Liberty Equality Fraternity 22, 23, 24 February")

=== 22 February ===
Aware of the political gatherings scheduled for the following day, the French government banned the political banquets for the second time on 21 February. The ban succeeded in pressuring the organizing committee to cancel the events. However, the workers and students, mobilising in the previous days, refused to back down over the demonstrations. 22 February started quietly, and at 9 a.m., members of the Municipal Guard who had been assigned to arrest the banquet leaders were recalled to their normal duties by the Prefect of Police. Only a small number of troops remained at critical points. Shortly before noon, large crowds began flooding out onto the streets of Paris, gathering from the eastern suburbs and the Latin Quarter towards the Place de la Concorde and the Place de la Madeleine. Their appearance came as a surprise to the authorities, after the events were supposedly cancelled, and led to a confused initial response.

The crowds, mostly unarmed, easily overcame the few Municipal Guardsmen, filling the squares and nearly invading the Palais Bourbon, the seat of the Chamber of Deputies. These demonstrations soon developed into a large-scale, popular revolt, making 22 February the first day of the Revolution. With the arrival of reinforcements in the afternoon, protesters were dispersed from the Place de la Concorde and the Place de la Madeleine. The crowds were too large to be arrested or contained, and so they spread out around the Champs-Élysées and back into southeast Paris, building the first barricades. In the evening, early skirmishes took place with the Municipal Guard.

=== 23 February ===
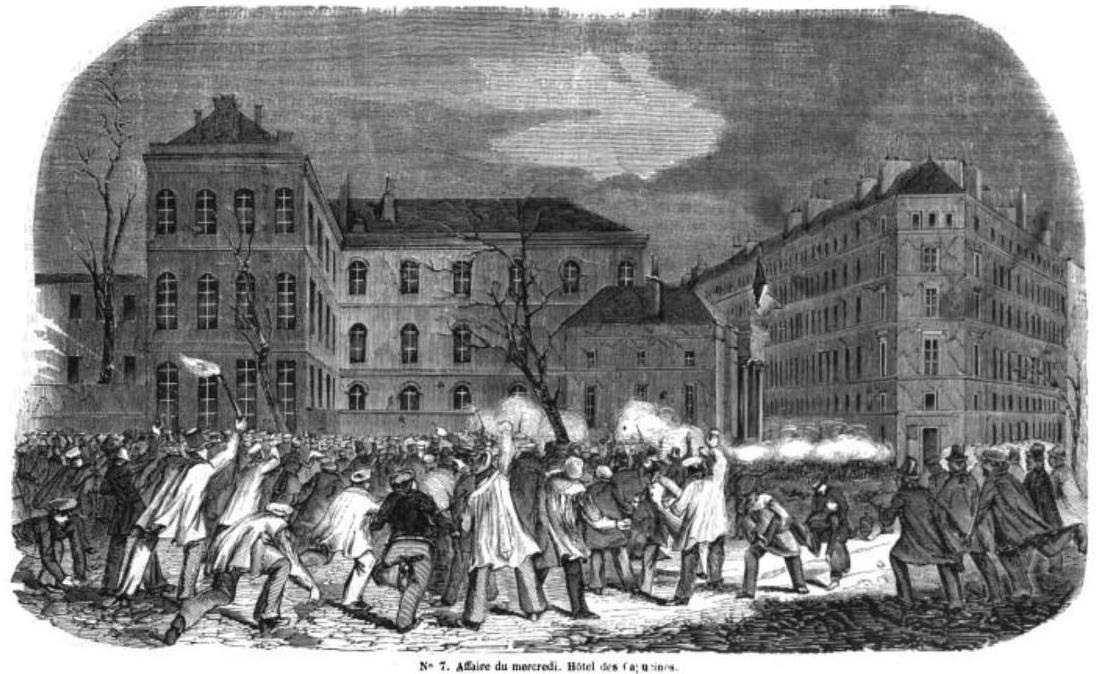
Soldiers firing at a crowd on the Boulevard des Capucines, 23 February 1848

On 23 February, the Ministry of War requested more regular troops from outside Paris. Crowds marched past Guizot's residence shouting "Down with Guizot" (À bas Guizot) and "Long Live the Reform" (Vive la réforme). The National Guard was mobilized, however its soldiers refused to engage the crowds, and instead joined them in their demonstrations against Guizot and King Louis Philippe. In the early afternoon, Louis Philippe summoned Guizot to the Tuileries Palace, the king's residence, and reluctantly asked for his resignation. Guizot returned to the Parliament where he resigned as prime minister, and the King then requested Count Molé to form a new government.

Upon Guizot's resignation, the leaders of the Movement Party (known as the "dynastic opposition"), Adolphe Thiers and Odilon Barrot, congratulated themselves on achieving a change of ministry while preserving the monarchy. After news of Guizot's resignation spread through Paris, fighting gradually ceased and the crowds began to celebrate. However, despite the fall of an unpopular government, underlying social pressures remained, and republicans still sought to secure a change of regime.

At around 9:30 pm, a crowd of over six hundred gathered outside the Ministry of Foreign Affairs on the Boulevard des Capucines. The building was guarded by about two hundred men of the 14th Line Infantry Regiment. The commanding officer ordered the crowd not to pass, but the soldiers began to be pressed by the crowd. The officer then ordered his men to fix bayonets in order to keep people at distance. However, as they were performing this, an unidentified weapon was discharged, and in response the soldiers opened fire on the crowd in a fusillade. 52 people were killed and 74 others were injured, and the crowd immediately dispersed as people fled in all directions.

News of the massacre soon sparked anger among Parisians. After the crowd regrouped on the Boulevard des Capucines, some of the dead were loaded on to horse-drawn wagons and paraded through the streets by workers calling for vengeance, as a general call to arms. During the night between 23 and 24 February, over 1,500 barricades were erected throughout Paris, and many railways leading to the city were sabotaged.

=== 24 February ===
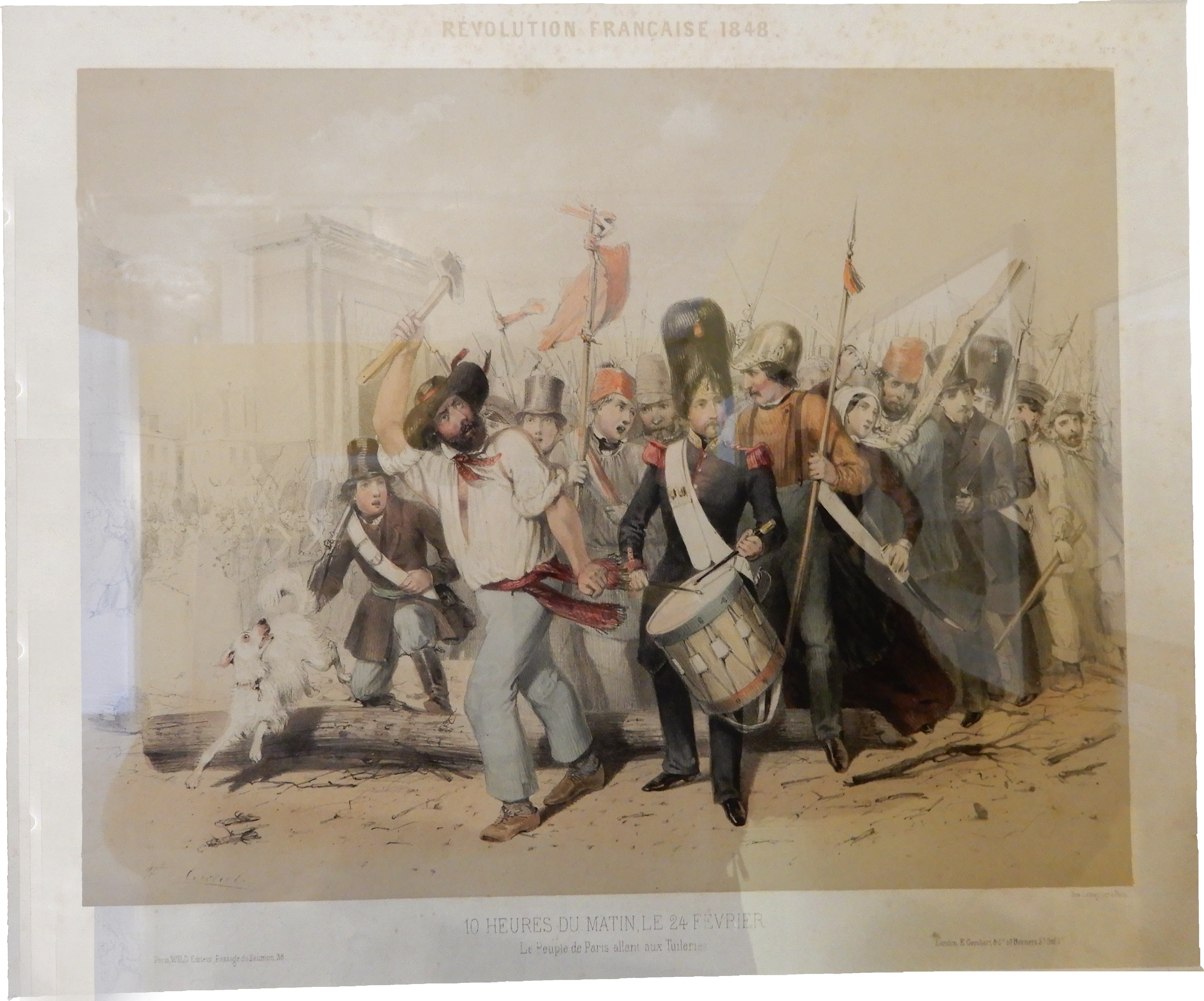
Lithograph: 10 a.m., 24 February. The people of Paris going to the Tuileries

By 24 February, Paris was a barricaded city, and King Louis Philippe remained without a government, as first Molé, then Thiers, failed to form a cabinet. After hearing of the massacre on the Boulevard des Capucines, Louis Philippe called for a government to be installed by Barrot, who represented a significant concession to the reformists. At the same time, however, the king gave the command of the troops in Paris to Marshal Bugeaud, who was despised by the crowds for his reputation of brutality in suppressing protests. In the early morning, Bugeaud sent four columns through the city in an attempt to defeat the insurgents at the barricades. However, Louis Philippe, intending to avoid even more bloodshed, ordered the officers in charge to attempt to negotiate before opening fire. Several barracks in Paris were attacked, and a convoy of ammunition was captured by the insurgents at Vincennes. The seat of the city administration, the Hôtel de Ville, was taken by the revolutionary National Guards. Bugeaud ordered all his soldiers to fall back and consolidate the defense around the Tuileries Palace.

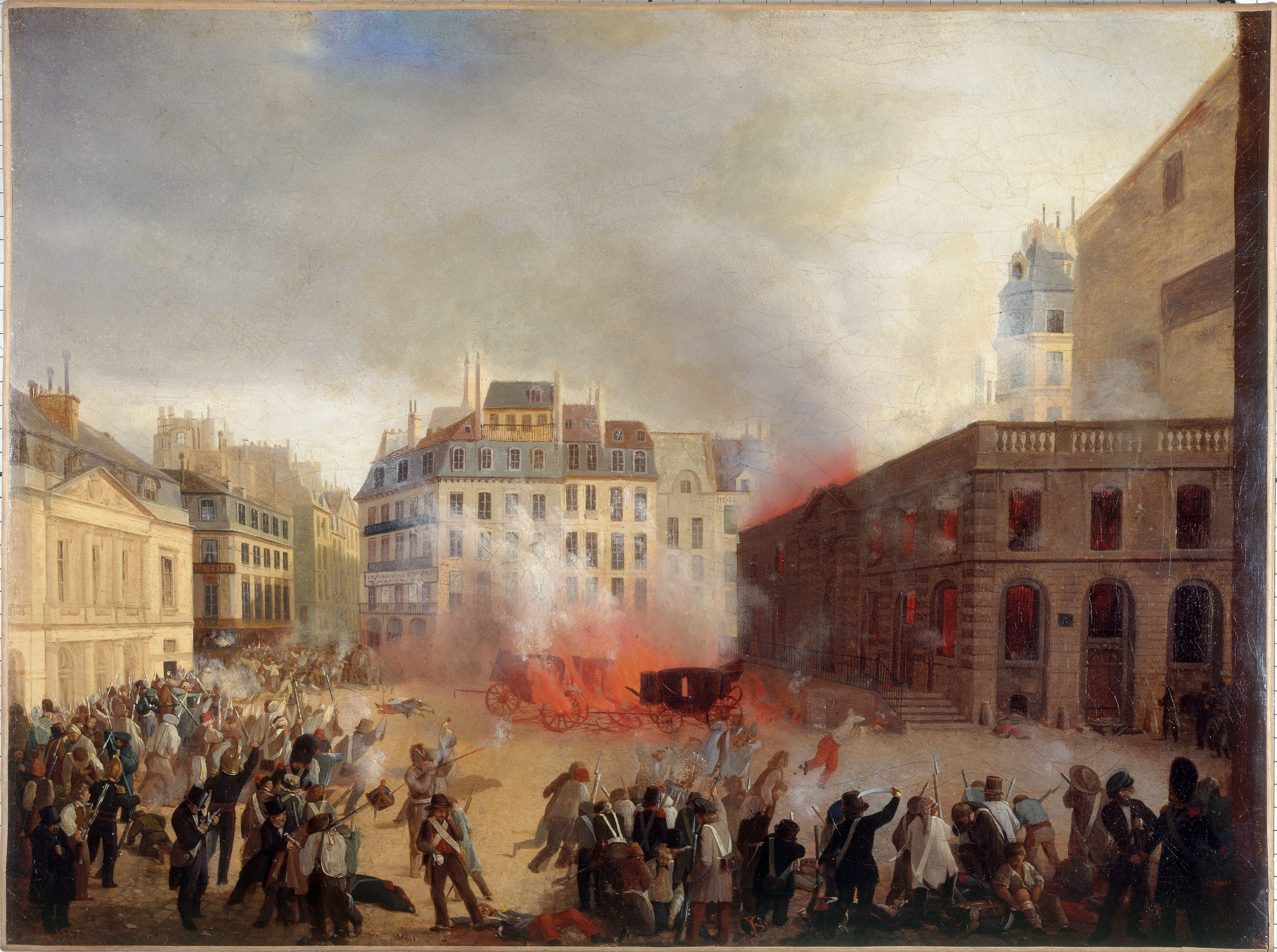
Capture and burning of the Château d'Eau by the revolutionaries, 24 February 1848

During the morning, heavy fighting broke out in several parts of Paris, with the largest combat taking place at the Place du Château d'Eau. There, armed insurgents attacked the Château d'Eau, a guard post on the way to the Tuileries held by about one hundred men of the Municipal Guard and the despised 14th Line Regiment. After intense fighting, the Château d'Eau was overrun and set on fire, with the surviving soldiers throwing away their weapons in surrender.

With the insurgents closing in on the royal palace, Thiers advised Louis Philippe to leave Paris and crush the revolution from outside with an overwhelming force of regular troops; however, this strategy was soundly rejected by Thiers' colleagues, including Barrot. While the Château d'Eau burned, the king received conflicting pieces of advice from his allies, and briefly collapsed in his study. Émile de Girardin was the first of his advisors to suggest abdication. At around noon, realizing no further defense was possible, Louis Philippe called off all resistance and formally abdicated in favor of his nine-year-old grandson Philippe, Count of Paris.

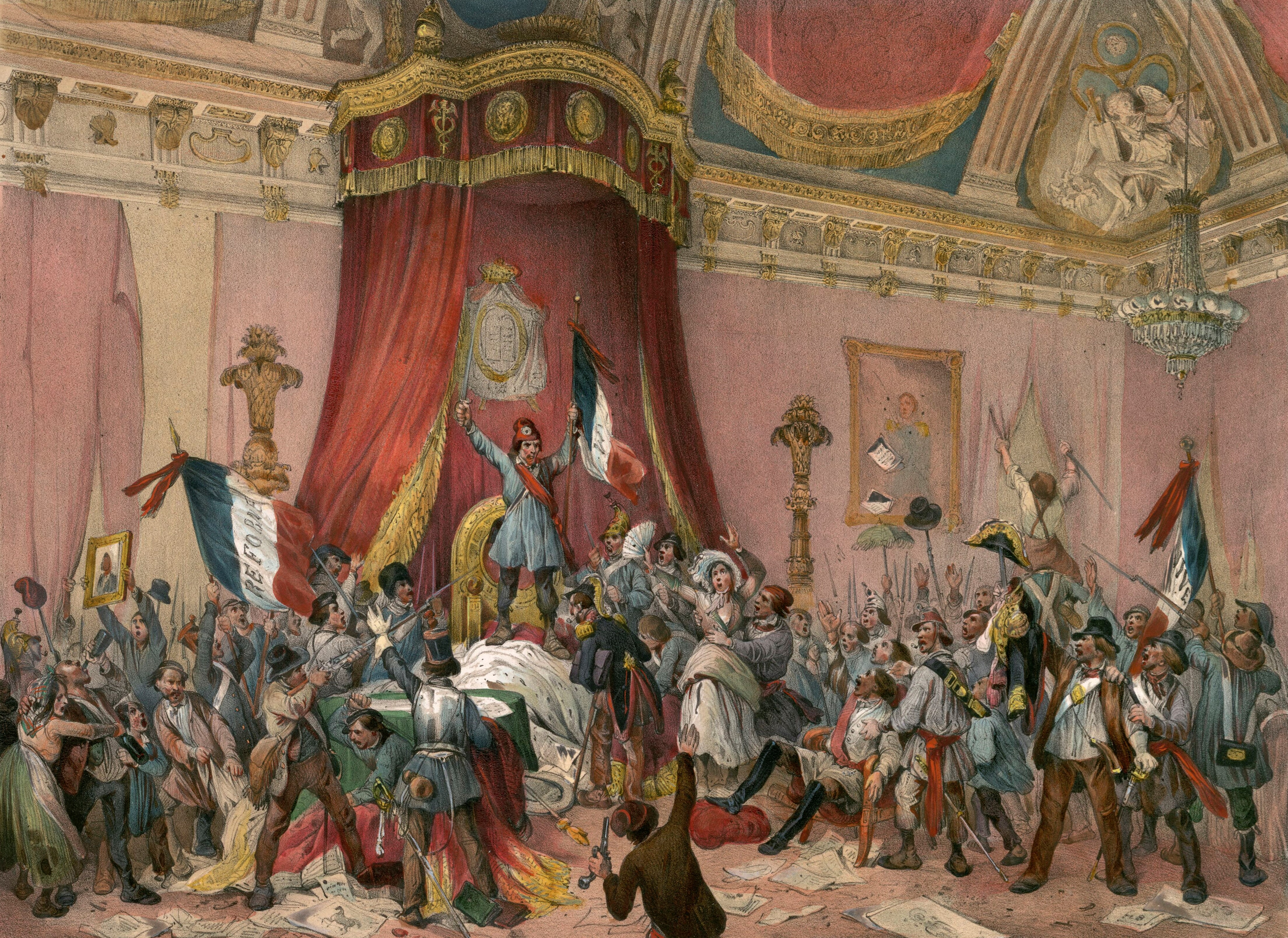
The throne room of the Tuileries Palace seized by a revolutionary mob

Louis Philippe and Queen Maria Amalia boarded a carriage awaiting at the Place de la Concorde and left Paris escorted by cavalry. After the royal couple's departure, the revolutionaries finally seized the now nearly deserted Tuileries Palace. On the king's throne, which would be burned the next day at the Place de la Bastille, they wrote, "The People of Paris to All Europe: Liberty, Equality, Fraternity. 24 February 1848". The Palais Royal, the historic seat of the Orléans family in Paris, was likewise invaded by revolutionaries and sacked. Another Orléans residence just west of Paris, the Château de Neuilly, was pillaged and largely burned down on the 25th.

=== Later political developments ===
After Louis Philippe's abdication, his daughter-in-law Helena, Duchess of Orléans, became the presumptive regent of France as the mother of Philippe, Count of Paris. She therefore, along with her son, went from the Tuileries to the Chamber of Deputies to try to prevent the abolition of the monarchy. However, following their victory at the Tuileries, the revolutionary crowd broke into the meeting hall of the Chamber. The effort by the dynastic opposition to secure a regency was defeated by popular calls for a Republic, and a preliminary list of members of a provisional government was announced by deputy Alphonse de Lamartine.

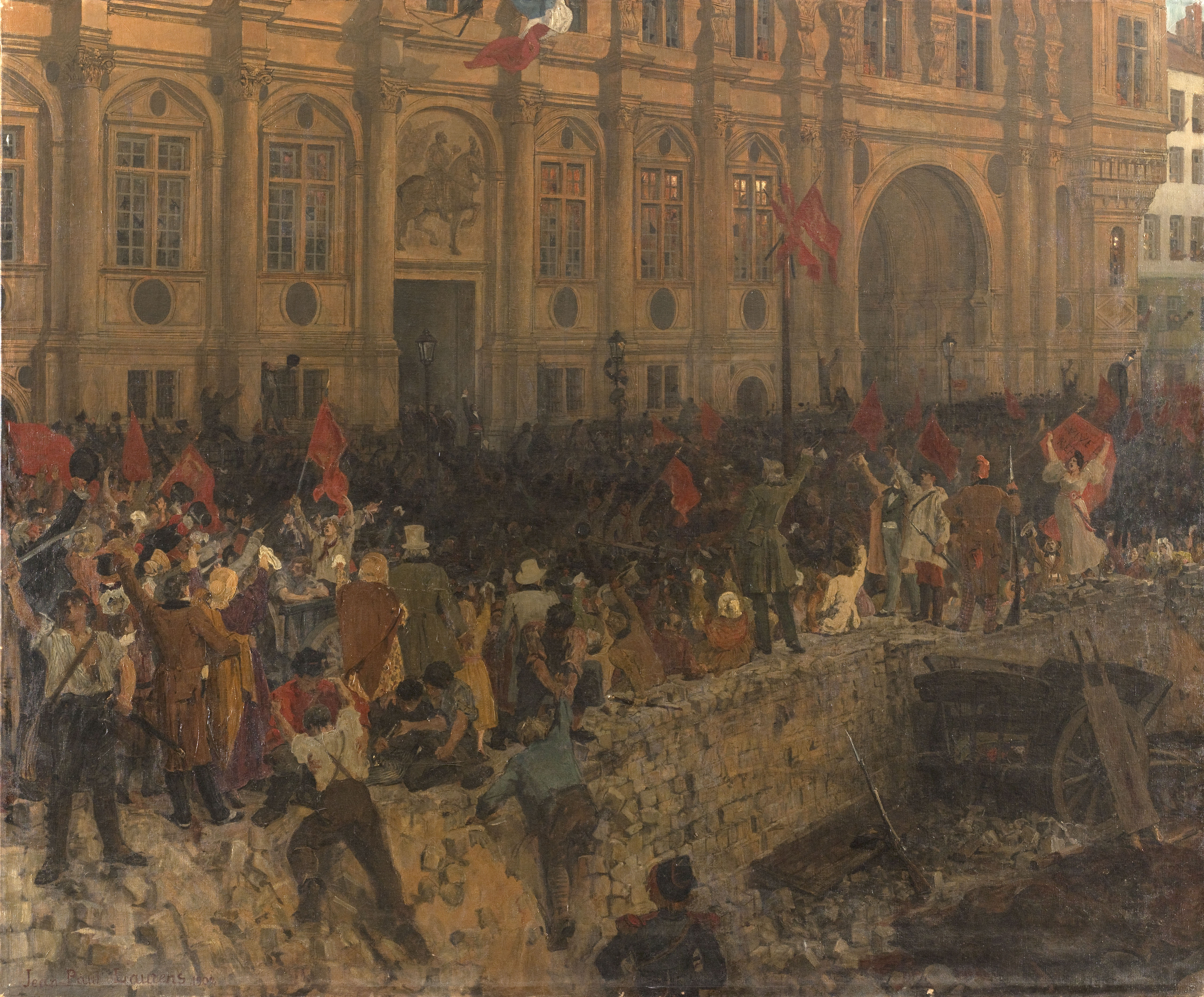
Proclamation of the Republic outside the Hôtel de Ville, painted by Jean-Paul Laurens

Responding to cries of "To the Hôtel de Ville!", Lamartine, along with the left-wing republican deputy Ledru-Rollin, marched to the Hôtel de Ville. There, on the evening, the final list of the eleven individuals who would form the Provisional Government was drawn up, with its members then being proclaimed one by one to the crowd outside. Its composition was the result of a compromise between the moderate and radical tendencies of the republican movement, associated, respectively, with the newspapers Le National and La Réforme. In the early hours of 25 February, Lamartine came to the balcony of the Hôtel de Ville and, followed by cheering from the crowd, he proclaimed the French Republic.

== Impact abroad ==
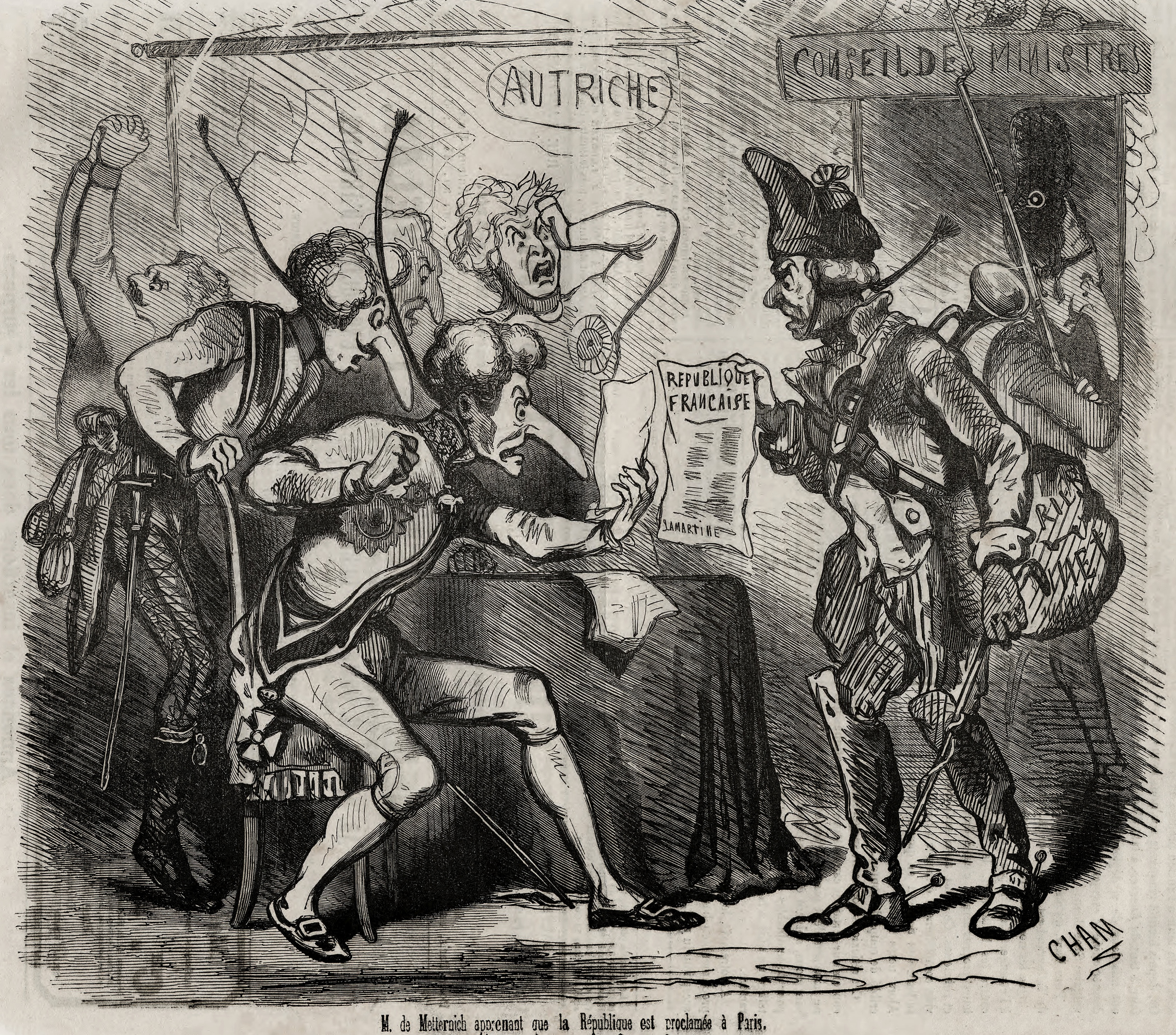
Caricature by Cham of Austrian conservative statesman Klemens von Metternich learning about the proclamation of the Republic in France

The February Revolution had a major impact in Europe, sparking a revolutionary wave known as the Revolutions of 1848. The American chargé d'affaires to the Austrian Empire, William H. Stiles, reported the Revolution "fell like a bomb amid the states and kingdoms of the Continent", and that "the various monarchs hastened to pay their subjects the constitutions which they owed them". As one of its immediate effects, it sparked a wave of revolutions in the German states. The outcome of the Revolution in France pressured the monarchs of Prussia, Bavaria, Austria and Sardinia into granting liberal reforms.

In Mexico, monarchist sentiment had gained traction since 1845, envisioning the restoration of the First Mexican Empire under a European monarch as the cure to the country's chronic instability. Great Britain, the Netherlands, and France were cited as examples of countries that had abandoned unstable republican forms of government and found prosperity as parliamentary monarchies. The fall of the French monarchy and its replacement by a republic switched political fashion back to republicanism and may have prevented a monarchist restoration in the aftermath of the Mexican defeat in the Mexican-American War.

== In fiction ==
- Rudin, the protagonist of Ivan Turgenev's 1856 novel of the same name, dies at the barricades of the revolution in the epilogue.
- Gustave Flaubert's 1869 novel L'éducation sentimentale uses the 1848 revolution as a backdrop for its story.
- The character of Piotr Alejandrovitch Miusov, uncle and tutor of Dmitri Fyodorovich Karamazov in Fyodor Dostoyevsky's 1880 novel The Brothers Karamazov, hinted that he himself had almost taken part in the fighting on the barricades in the 1848 revolution.
- Choses vues by Victor Hugo includes passages concerning the author's actions during the time of the revolution in Paris. It was published posthumously in 1887.
- Alexis de Tocqueville's 1893 Recollections (also known as Souvenirs) provides primary insight from a moderate liberal as he saw events unfold.
- Sylvia Townsend Warner's 1936 novel Summer Will Show uses the 1848 revolution as a primary part of the plot.
- Rachel Field's novel All This and Heaven Too (1938) uses unrest leading up to the 1848 revolution as a backdrop for its story.
- Laura Kalpakian's 1995 novel Cosette uses the 1848 revolution as a primary part of the plot.
- Kurt Andersen's 2007 novel Heyday begins with one of the protagonists witnessing and unintentionally participating in the 1848 revolution.
- L'Autre Dumas (English: The Other Dumas), a 2010 French film directed by Safy Nebbou, depicts Alexandre Dumas in a fictitious involvement with a young female revolutionary.

== See also ==
- Proclamation of the abolition of the monarchy
- Charles de Choiseul-Praslin
- History of the French Left
- Bourgeois revolution
- Revolutionary Spring: Fighting for a New World 1848–1849 by Christopher Clark
- Uprising of March 18, 1871

== Bibliography ==
- Agulhon, Maurice (1983). The Republican experiment, 1848-1852. The Cambridge history of modern France. Cambridge [Cambridgeshire]; New York : Paris: Cambridge University Press. ISBN 978-0-521-24829-7. OL 3503110M.
- Amann, Peter H. (2015). Revolution and Mass Democracy: The Paris Club of 1848. Princeton University Press. ISBN 978-1-4008-7298-5.
- Ankersmit, Frank (2016). "Tocqueville and Flaubert on 1848: The Sublimity of Revolution". Graduate Faculty Philosophy Journal. 37 (2): 253–271. doi:10.5840/gfpj201637217.
- Beecher, Jonathan (2021). Writers and revolution: intellectuals and the French Revolution of 1848. Cambridge (GB): Cambridge University Press. ISBN 978-1-108-84253-2.
- Castleton, Edward (2018). "Untimely Meditations on the Revolution of 1848 in France". Opera Historica. 19 (2): 244–270. doi:10.32725/oph.2018.021.
- Clark, Timothy James; Courbet, Gustave (1999). Image of the people: Gustave Courbet and the 1848 revolution. Berkeley: University of California Press. ISBN 978-0-520-21745-4.
- Collins, Ross William (1923). Catholicism and the second French republic, 1848-1852. New York: Columbia University. OL 16350140M.
- Coutant, Arnaud (2009). 1848, quand la République combattait la démocratie: recherche. Collection Droit & science politique (in French). Paris: Mare & Martin. ISBN 978-2-84934-066-0.
- Crook, Malcolm (2015). "Universal Suffrage as Counter-Revolution? Electoral Mobilisation under the Second Republic in France, 1848–1851". Journal of Historical Sociology. 28 (1): 49–66. doi:10.1111/johs.12035.
- Duveau, Georges (1967). 1848: the making of a revolution. Translated by Carter, Anne. Introduction by George Rudé. New York: Vintage Books. ISBN 978-0-394-70471-5.
- Fasel, George (Autumn 1974). "The Wrong Revolution: French Republicanism in 1848". French Historical Studies. 8 (4): 654–677. doi:10.2307/285857. JSTOR 285857.
- Fortescue, William (2005). France and 1848: the end of monarchy. London: Routledge. ISBN 978-0-415-31462-6. OL 22622246M.
- Heywood, O. E.; Heywood, C. M. (1994). "Rethinking the 1848 Revolution in France: The Provisional Government and its Enemies". History. 79 (257): 394–411. doi:10.1111/j.1468-229X.1994.tb01606.x. JSTOR 24422386.
- Kim, Richard (2012). "Virtue and the material culture of the nineteenth century: the debate over the mass marketplace in France in the aftermath of the 1848 revolution". Theory and Society. 41 (6): 557–579. doi:10.1007/s11186-012-9176-6.
- Loubère, Leo (1968). "The Emergence of the Extreme Left in Lower Languedoc, 1848–1851: Social and Economic Factors in Politics". American Historical Review. 73 (4): 1019–1051. doi:10.2307/1847387. JSTOR 1847387.
- Merriman, John M. (1978). The agony of the Republic: the repression of the left in revolutionary France, 1848-1851. New Haven: Yale University Press. ISBN 978-0-300-02151-6.
- Moss, Bernard H. (1984). "June 13, 1849: the abortive uprising of French radicalism". French Historical Studies. 13 (3): 390–414. doi:10.2307/286299. JSTOR 286299.
- Price, Roger, ed. (2022) [First published in 1975]. Revolution and Reaction: 1848 and the Second French Republic. Routledge. ISBN 978-1-000-53571-6.
- Rudé, George F. E. (1964). "11: 'The French Revolution of 1848'". The crowd in history: a study of popular disturbances in France and England 1730-1848. New dimensions in history essays in comparative history. New York; London; Sydney: Wiley. pp. 164–178. ISBN 978-0-471-74462-7. OL 13342684W.
- Takeda, Chinatsu (2018). "The Reception of Considerations: A Constitutional Historiography of the French Revolution (1818–1848)". Mme de Staël and Political Liberalism in France. Singapore: Springer Publishing. pp. 261–279. ISBN 978-981-10-8087-6.

=== Primary sources ===
- Tocqueville, Alexis de; Teixeira de Mattos, Alexander (1896). Recollections of Alexis de Tocqueville. Translated by Teixeira de Mattos, Alexander. London: Henry & Co.
- Marx, Karl (2003). The Class Struggles in France: From the February Revolution to the Paris Commune. Resistance Books. ISBN 978-1-876646-19-6.
