= Émile Faguet =

French author and literary critic

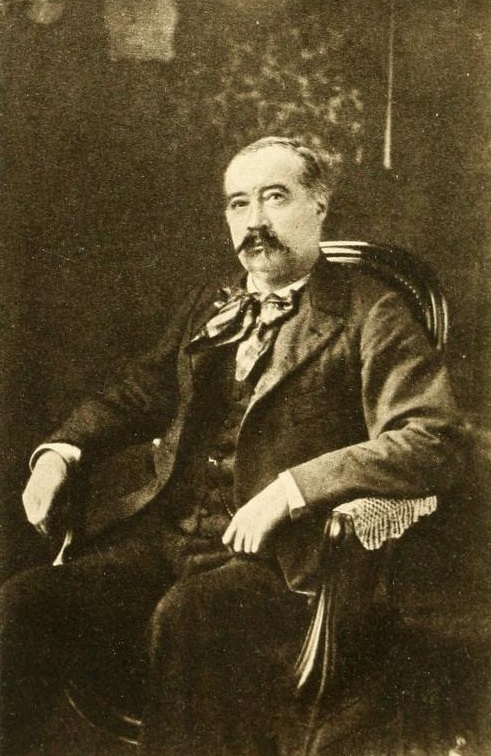
- Portrait of Faguet, by Henri Mannes
- Born: Auguste Émile Faguet; 17 December 1847; La Roche-sur-Yon, Vendée
- Died: 7 June 1916 (aged 68); Paris
- Education: École normale supérieure
- Occupations: Literary critic, and author
- Spouse: Suzanne Travichon
- Writing career
- Notable work: The Cult of Incompetence

Auguste Émile Faguet (French pronunciation: [emil faɡɛ]; 17 December 1847 – 7 June 1916) was a French author and literary critic.

== Biography ==
Faguet was born at La Roche-sur-Yon, Vendée, and educated at the École normale supérieure in Paris. After teaching for some time in La Rochelle and Bordeaux, he returned to Paris to act as assistant professor of poetry in the university. Faguet became professor in 1897. He was elected to the Académie française in 1900, and received the ribbon of the Légion d'honneur in the next year.

Faguet acted as dramatic critic to the Soleil; from 1892 he was literary critic to the Revue Bleue; and in 1896 took the place of Jules Lemaître on the Journal des débats. Faguet died in Paris, aged 68.

== Works ==
- De Aurelii Prudentii Clementis Carminibus Lyricis (1883).
- La Tragédie Française au XVIe Siècle (1883).
- Corneille (1885).
- La Fontaine (1889).
- Notes sur le Théatre Contemporain, (3 vols., 1889–1891).
- Politiques et Moralistes du XIXe Siècle (1891).
- Voltaire (1895).
- Cours de Poésie Française de l'Université de Paris (1897).
- Drame Ancien, Drame Moderne (1898).
- Questions Politiques (1899).
- Flaubert (1899).
- Discours de Réception de M. Émile Faguet (1901).
- André Chénier (1902).
- Propos Littéraires (5 vols., 1902–1910).
- Zola (1903).
- Le Libéralisme (1903).
- Propos de Théâtre (5 vols., 1903–1910).
- Simplification Simple de l’Orthographe (1905).
- Pour qu'on Lise Platon (1905).
- L'Anticléricalisme (1906).
- Le Socialisme en 1907 (1907).
- Problèmes Politiques du Temps Présent (1907).
- Le Pacifisme (1908).
- Discussions Politiques (1909).
- La Démission de la Morale (1910).
- Les Dix Commandements (10 vols., 1909–1910):
  - De l'Amour de Soi
  - De l'Amour.
  - De la Famille.
  - De l'Amitié.
  - De la Vieillesse.
  - De la Profession.
  - La Patrie.
  - De la Vérité.
  - Le Devoir.
  - De Dieu.
- Études Littéraires (1910).
- Madame de Sévigné (1910).
- Le Féminisme (1910).
- Les Amies de Rousseau (1910).
- Rousseau Contre Molière (1910).
- Vie de Rousseau (1911).
- En Lisant les Beaux Vieux Livres (1911).
- La Poésie Française (1911).
- Les Préjugés Nécessaires (1911).
- Rousseau Penseur (1912).
- Rousseau Artiste (1912).
- La Prose Française (1912).
- Ce que Disent les Livres (1912).
- L’Art de Lire (1912).
- De l'Idée de Patrie (1913).
- Monseigneur Dupanloup: Un Grand Évêque (1914).
- En Lisant Molière (1914).
- Chansons d'un Passant (1921).

In English translation

- Politicians & Moralists of the Nineteenth Century (1899).
- A Literary History of France (1907).
- "French Seventeenth Century Literature and its European Influence." In: The Cambridge Modern History (1908).
- The Cult of Incompetence (1911).
- Balzac (1914).
- Flaubert (1914).
- The Dread of Responsibility (1914).
- Initiation into Literature (1914).
- Initiation into Philosophy (1914).
- On Reading Nietzsche (1918).

Selected articles

- "Mme de Staël," Revue des Deux Mondes 83, 1887.
- "M. Ferdinand Brunetière," La Revue de Paris 1, 1894.
- "Le Livre a Paris," Cosmopolis 5, 1897.
- "Mesdames, Bientot au Vote!," La Revue des Deux Frances 4, 1898.
- "Corrections de Flaubert", La Revue Bleue, 3 June 1899.
- "All About a Hat," The Living Age 8, September 1900.
- "The Symbolical Drama," The International Quarterly 8, September 1903/March 1904.
- "Andrew Lang's 'The Mysteries of History'," The Sewanee Review 16, 1908.
- "Philosophie Scientifique." In: Henri Poincaré: Biographie, Bibliographie Analytique des Écrits, 1909.
- "La Vie de Nietzsche," Revue des Deux Mondes 58, 1910.
- "Essais et Notices," Revue des Deux Mondes, LXXXe Année, 1910.
- "François Maynard," Revue des Pyrénées 23, 1911.
- "Viele-Griffin," La Revue Bleue, 15 April 1912.
- "Thiers," Revue des Deux Mondes, XCe Année, 1920.
- "On the Nature of the Dramatic Emotion," The Tulane Drama Review 3 (2), 1958.

Miscellany

- Preface to Guillaume Guizot's Montaigne: Études et Fragments (1899).
- Introduction to Montesquieu's Lettres Persanes (1900).
- Preface to Édouard Ruel's Du Sentiment Artistique dans la Morale de Montaigne (1901).
- Preface to Séché & Bertaut's L'Évolution du Théâtre Contemporain (1908).
- Preface to Joseph Grasset's The Marvels Beyond Science (1910).
- Preface to André Gayot's Une Ancienne Muscadine, Fortunée Hamelin (1911).
- Preface to Arthur Meyer's Ce Que Mes Yeux On Vu (1911).
- Preface to Jean Harmand's A Keeper of Royal Secrets: Being the Private and Political Life of Madame De Genlis (1913).
- Introduction to Pierre Marivaux's Théâtre (1915).
- Introduction to Lessage's Gil Blas (n.d.)
- Introduction to Paul Courier's Lettres et Pamphlets (n.d.)
- Introduction to Alfred de Musset's Poésies (n.d.)

== See also ==
- Francisque Sarcey
