= Pauline de Meulan =

French writer and journalist

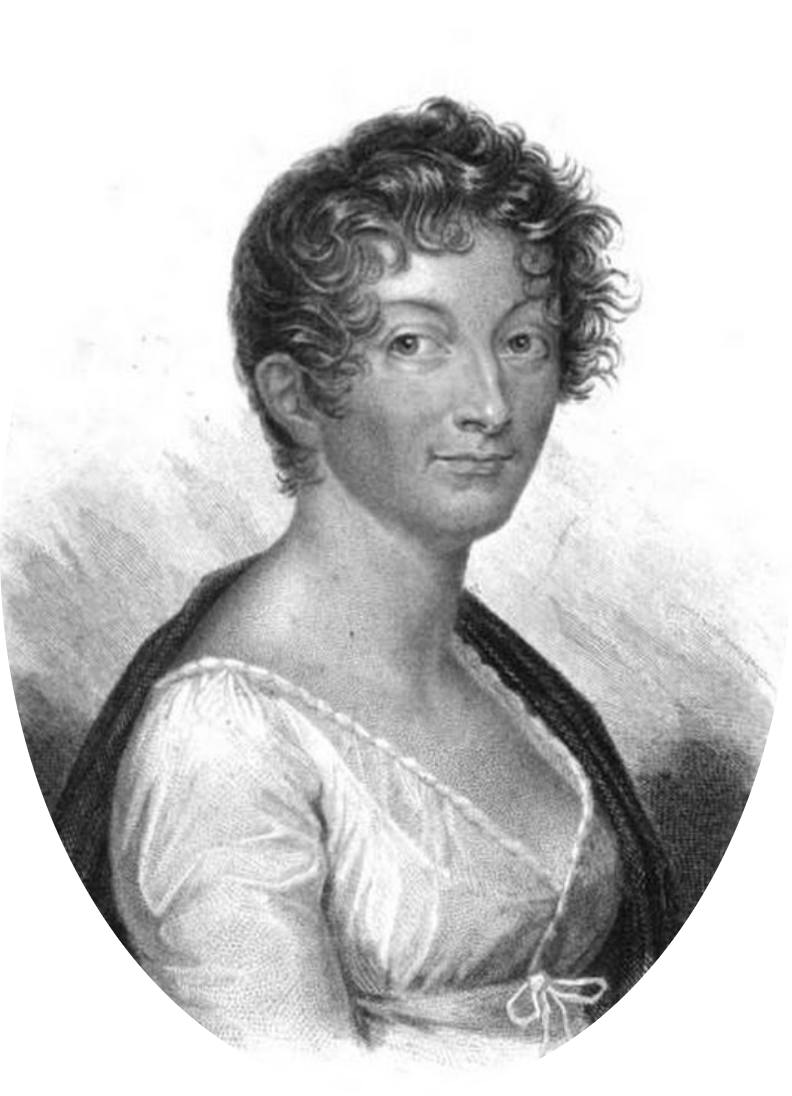
- Born: Elisabeth-Charlotte-Pauline de Meulan; 2 November 1773; Paris, France
- Died: 1 August 1827 (aged 53)
- Resting place: Père Lachaise Cemetery, Paris
- Occupation: Writer, journalist
- Spouse: François Guizot
- Relatives: Henriette-Marie de Meulan (sister)

Pauline de Meulan (2 November 1773 – 1 August 1827) was a French writer and journalist, known especially for her work on education and her liberal position in the aftermath of the French Revolution. French literary critic Sainte-Beuve described her as the best and most important moralist since Jean-Jacques Rousseau.

== Biography ==
Pauline de Meulan was the daughter of Count Charles de Meulan, an advisor to the King and collector-general of Paris, later of Marguerite de Saint-Chamans. Her father died early in the French Revolution, likely due to stress. The family lost much of their fortune during the Revolution, and de Meulan began writing as a way to financially support her family.

With the help of Jean-Baptiste-Antoine Suard, she began writing for the magazine Le Publiciste in 1799. She also began publishing novels in 1799. She published Les Contradictions in 1799, a novel about a young man during the aftermath of the French Revolution. She also translated the very popular epistolary novel Memoirs of Emma Courtney by English writer Mary Hays.

She married François Guizot in 1812. The couple seemed strange since she was 14 years older than François and both had very different characters, as stated by Gabriel de Broglie in the following table taken from his book Guizot:

François Guizot	Pauline de Meulan
Provincial, born in a petty bourgeois family, without fortune	Born in a noble and wealthy family of the Old Regime. Brought up in a brilliant society
Protestant, rigorous	Catholic, tolerant
Solitary and withdrawn	Enjoys theater and society
Bookish and serious	Spiritual, spicy, cultivates the art of paradox
Reads religious and philosophy books	Is fond of Racine
Dogmatic, theoretician, has plenty metaphysical certainties	Observant, pragmatic, without great convictions

The couple worked together on several major projects, including a journal on education called Les Annales de l'Éducation. The journal ran six editions from 1811 until 1814. She also assisted in editing and writing Abailard et Héloise: essai historique with her husband.

Pauline Guizot died in 1827 of tuberculosis. Before her death, she arranged for her husband's second marriage to her niece, Élisa Dillon.

== Works ==
- Les Contradictions, ou ce qui peut arriver (1799)
- La Chapelle d’Ayton, ou Emma Courtenay (1799)
- Essais de littérature et de morale (1802)
- Écolier, ou Raoul et Victor (1821)
- Lettres de famille sur l'éducation (1826)
- Une famille (1828)
- Conseils de morale, ou Essais sur l'homme, la société, la littérature (1828)
