= Campagne des banquets =

French meetings during the July Monarchy

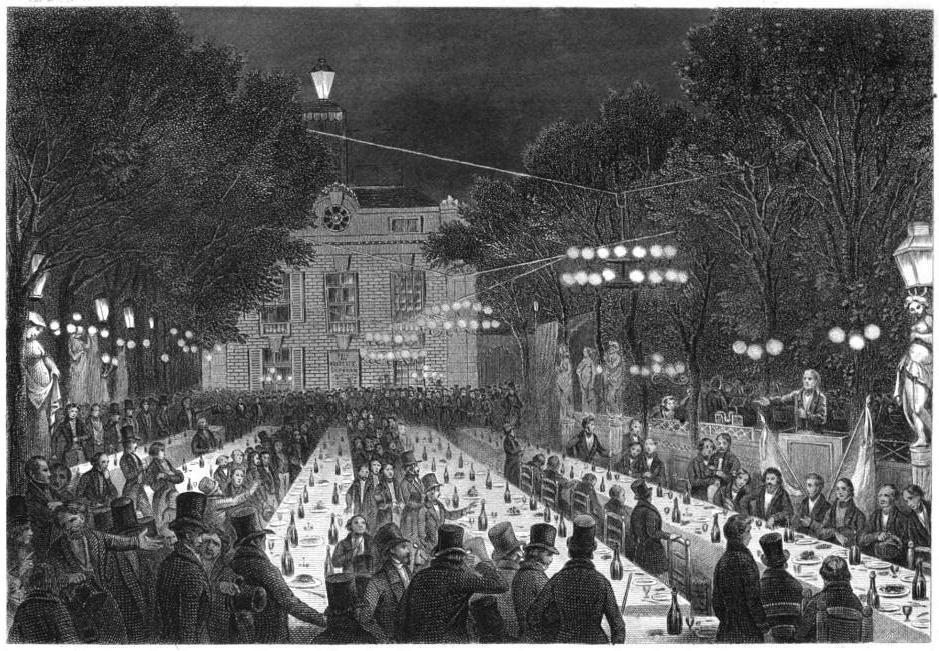
The banquet of Château-Rouge, held in Paris on 9 July 1847, began the campagne des banquets

The campagne des banquets (English: campaign of banquets) was a series of politically subversive meetings during the July Monarchy in France in 1847. The campaign, which destabilized King Louis Philippe I, officially took place from 9 July to 25 December but in fact continued until the February 1848 Revolution, in which the Second Republic was proclaimed. During the campaign, the Republican triptych Liberté, égalité, fraternité resurfaced, including in Lille with Ledru-Rollin.

The banquets were private political meetings which were a way to circumvent the 1835 act prohibiting public assemblies. The first session was in Paris on 9 July 1847, and progressively spread to all of the French provinces. The prohibition of one of these meetings by François Guizot's cabinet, supposed to take place on 14 January 1848 in the 12th arrondissement of Paris, and then of another one set up for 22 February 1848, were the immediate cause of the riots which led to Louis-Philippe's abdication.

== Origins ==
The 1846-1848 economic crisis favored the opposition, who became progressively more united. After the reforms obtained during the parliamentary session of 1847, such as the lowering of the cens tax to 100 Francs in March, the prohibition of the cumulation of administrative public offices with deputies' seat, Guizot's cabinet became more authoritarian. In preparation of the 1847-1848 parliamentary session, Louis Philippe prohibited the meetings of the democrat, republican and liberal opposition. The more liberal of the Orleanists gathered behind Adolphe Thiers claimed a more parliamentary regime, and joined force with the Left.

== The campaign ==
The moderate left-wing opposition used these banquets as occasions to organize themselves and to claim for a reform of the electoral law and a larger enfranchisement. 70 banquets attended by 17,000 persons took place from July 1847 to February 1848, in all of the country. Three days before the opening of the parliamentary session, on 25 December 1847, the campaign was officially stopped. But the King's speech on 28 December and his declared opposition to any reform relaunched the campaign, with a solemn address being sent to the King.

The prohibition of the 22 February 1848 banquet in honor of the birthday of George Washington (the United States of America being a symbol of democracy at the time) and the unrest which followed triggered the 1848 Revolution by a union of the popular Republicans and the liberal Orleanists, who turned their back on Louis Philippe.

== Influence ==
The 1847 campaign of banquets was used as a model for the opposition to the Tsar Nicholas II, in 1904–1905, where it was a cause of the Russian Revolution of 1905.

== Cultural depictions ==
The banquets are mentioned several times in Gustave Flaubert's 1869 novel Sentimental Education:

He remained standing near the chimney-piece. The others seated, with their pipes in their mouths, listened to him, while he held forth on universal suffrage, from which he predicted as a result the triumph of Democracy and the practical application of the principles of the Gospel. However, the hour was at hand. The banquets of the party of reform were becoming more numerous in the provinces. Piedmont, Naples, Tuscany——

[…]

"But what is it that's not prohibited?" exclaimed Deslauriers. "To smoke in the Luxembourg is prohibited; to sing the Hymn to Pius IX. is prohibited!"

"And the typographers' banquet has been interdicted," a voice cried, with a thick articulation.

[…]

After this, they engaged in conversations about Léotade, M. Guizot, the Pope, the insurrection at Palermo, and the banquet of the Twelfth Arrondissement, which had caused some disquietude. Frederick eased his mind by railing against Power, for he longed, like Deslauriers, to turn the whole world upside down, so soured had he now become. Madame Arnoux, on her side, had become sad.

[…]

In fact, a manifesto published in the newspapers had summoned to this spot all who had subscribed to the banquet of the Reform Party. The Ministry had, almost without a moment's delay, posted up a proclamation prohibiting the meeting. The Parliamentary Opposition had, on the previous evening, disclaimed any connection with it; but the patriots, who were unaware of this resolution on the part of their leaders, had come to the meeting-place, followed by a great crowd of spectators. A deputation from the schools had made its way, a short time before, to the house of Odillon Barrot. It was now at the residence of the Minister for Foreign Affairs; and nobody could tell whether the banquet would take place, whether the Government would carry out its threat, and whether the National Guards would make their appearance. People were as much enraged against the deputies as against Power. The crowd was growing bigger and bigger, when suddenly the strains of the "Marseillaise" rang through the air.

It was the students' column which had just arrived on the scene. They marched along at an ordinary walking pace, in double file and in good order, with angry faces, bare hands, and all exclaiming at intervals:

"Long live Reform! Down with Guizot!"

Frederick's friends were there, sure enough. They would have noticed him and dragged him along with them. He quickly sought refuge in the Rue de l'Arcade.

When the students had taken two turns round the Madeleine, they went down in the direction of the Place de la Concorde. It was full of people; and, at a distance, the crowd pressed close together, had the appearance of a field of dark ears of corn swaying to and fro.

At the same moment, some soldiers of the line ranged themselves in battle-array at the left-hand side of the church.

The groups remained standing there, however. In order to put an end to this, some police-officers in civilian dress seized the most riotous of them in a brutal fashion, and carried them off to the guard-house. Frederick, in spite of his indignation, remained silent; he might have been arrested along with the others, and he would have missed Madame Arnoux.

A little while afterwards the helmets of the Municipal Guards appeared. They kept striking about them with the flat side of their sabres. A horse fell down. The people made a rush forward to save him, and as soon as the rider was in the saddle, they all ran away.

Then there was a great silence. The thin rain, which had moistened the asphalt, was no longer falling. Clouds floated past, gently swept on by the west wind.

— Sentimental Education, 1904 translation
