= Aurelian Crăiuțu =

Romanian-American political theorist (born 1966)

Aurelian Craiutu
- Born: 1966 (age 59–60)

Education
- Education: Princeton University (PhD)
- Thesis: The Difficult Apprenticeship of Liberty: Reflections on the Political Thought of the French Doctrinaires (1999)
- Doctoral advisor: George Kateb, Alan Ryan

Philosophical work
- Era: 21st-century philosophy
- Region: Western philosophy
- School: Liberalism
- Institutions: Indiana University Bloomington

Aurelian Craiutu (born 1966) is a Romanian-American political theorist and historian of political thought. He is the chair of the Department of Political Science and Arthur F. Bentley professor of political science at Indiana University Bloomington. His research focuses on modern political theory, liberalism and conservatism, political moderation, and the history of French political thought, particularly in the nineteenth century.

== Life ==
He was born in Romania and earned a B.A. with honors in economics from the Academy of Economic Studies in Bucharest in 1988, before pursuing graduate studies in France and the United States. He earned a Maîtrise degree at the University of Rennes I (1990–1991), and was a Fulbright visiting researcher at the University of Tennessee in Knoxville (1993–1994). He earned his Ph.D. in politics from Princeton University in 1999, with a dissertation entitled "The Difficult Apprenticeship of Liberty: Reflections on the Political Thought of the French Doctrinaires," which was supervised by George Kateb and Alan Ryan and earned him the 2000 Leo Strauss Award from the American Political Science Association.

He was a visiting assistant professor and Gerst Post-Doctoral Fellow in the Department of Political Science at Duke University (1999–2000). He then held the position of assistant professor at the University of Northern Iowa (2000–2001). He then joined the faculty of Indiana University Bloomington, where he has served as a professor in the Department of Political Science, where his teaching and research cover modern political thought, democratic theory, liberalism, conservatism, and the intellectual history of France and Europe.

Since 2018, he has been Senior Fellow at the Niskanen Center in Washington, D.C.

== Academic ==
Craiutu's scholarship examines the intellectual history of political moderation, liberalism, and conservatism, with particular attention to nineteenth-century French political thought. His work analyzes figures associated with doctrinaire liberalism and constitutionalism, including Alexis de Tocqueville, François Guizot, Benjamin Constant, and other theorists of post-revolutionary France. A recurring theme in his research is the concept of political moderation and its role in constitutional government, democratic stability, and liberal institutions.

== Works ==
=== In English ===
- Liberalism under Siege: The Political Thought of the French Doctrinaires (Lanham, Md: Lexington Books, Rowman & Littlefield, 2003).
- A Virtue for Courageous Minds: Moderation in French Political Thought, 1748-1830 (Princeton University Press, 2012).
- Faces of Moderation: The Art of Balance in an Age of Extremes (University of Pennsylvania Press, 2017).
- Why Not Moderation? Letters to Young Radicals (Cambridge University Press, 2023).

=== In Romanian ===
- Elogiul libertăţii: Studii de filosofie politică (Iaşi: Polirom, 1998).
- Elogiul moderaţiei (Iaşi: Polirom, 2006).

=== In French ===
- Le Centre introuvable: la pensée politique des doctrinaires français sous la Restauration, trans. Isabelle Hausser et revue par l’auteur (Paris: Éditions Plon, 2006).
