= François Guizot =

French historian, orator and statesman (1787–1874)

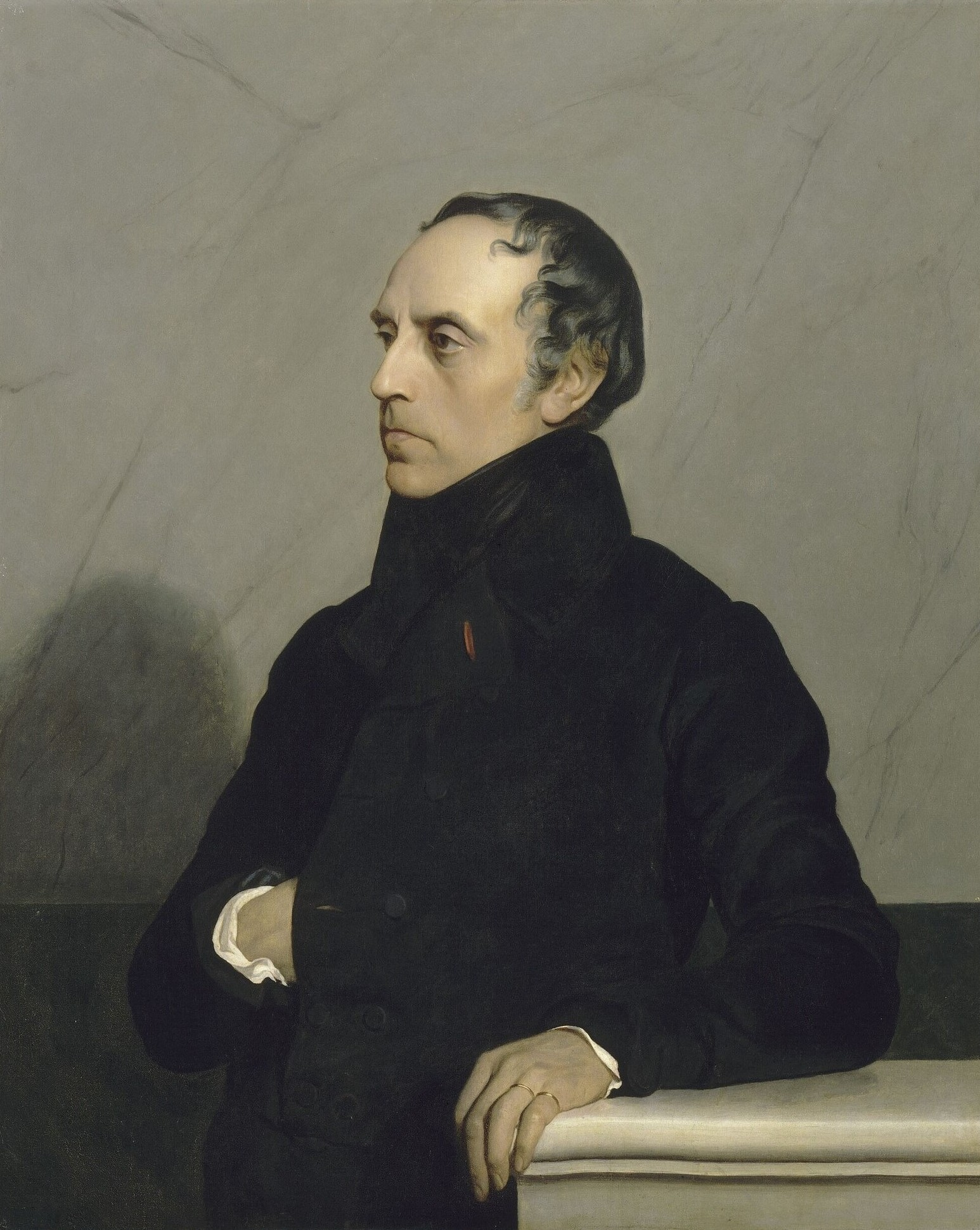
- Portrait by Jehan Georges Vibert

Prime Minister of France
- In office 18 September 1847 – 23 February 1848
- Monarch: Louis Philippe I
- Preceded by: Jean-de-Dieu Soult
- Succeeded by: Jacques-Charles Dupont

Minister of Foreign Affairs
- In office 29 October 1840 – 23 February 1848
- Prime Minister: Jean-de-Dieu Soult
- Preceded by: Adolphe Thiers
- Succeeded by: Alphonse de Lamartine

Minister of Public Education
- In office 6 September 1836 – 15 April 1837
- Monarch: Louis Philippe I
- Prime Minister: Louis-Mathieu Molé
- Preceded by: Joseph Pelet de la Lozère
- Succeeded by: Narcisse-Achille de Salvandy
- In office 18 November 1834 – 22 February 1836
- Monarch: Louis Philippe I
- Prime Minister: Édouard Mortier; Victor de Broglie
- Preceded by: Jean-Baptiste Teste
- Succeeded by: Joseph Pelet de la Lozère
- In office 11 October 1832 – 10 November 1834
- Monarch: Louis Philippe I
- Prime Minister: Jean-de-Dieu Soult
- Preceded by: Amédée Girod de l'Ain
- Succeeded by: Jean-Baptiste Teste

Minister of Interior
- In office 1 August 1830 – 2 November 1830
- Prime Minister: Jacques Laffitte
- Preceded by: Victor de Broglie
- Succeeded by: Camille de Montalivet

Member of the Chamber of Deputies for Calvados
- In office 23 June 1830 – 23 February 1848
- Preceded by: Louis Nicolas Vauquelin
- Succeeded by: Jean-Charles Besnard
- Constituency: Lisieux

Personal details
- Born: François Pierre Guillaume Guizot; 4 October 1787 Nîmes, Languedoc, Kingdom of France
- Died: 12 September 1874 (aged 86) Saint-Ouen-le-Pin, French Third Republic
- Party: Doctrinaire (1814–1830); Party of Resistance (1830–1848); Party of Order (1848–1852)
- Spouse(s): Pauline de Meulan (1812–1827); Élisa Dillon (1828–1833)
- Children: François (1819–1837); Henriette (1829–1908); Pauline (1831–1874); Guillaume (1833–1892)
- Education: University of Geneva
- Profession: Historian, teacher

François Pierre Guillaume Guizot (English: /ɡɪˈzoʊ/ gih-ZOH, French: [fʁɑ̃swa pjɛʁ ɡijom ɡizo]; 4 October 1787 – 12 September 1874) was a French historian, orator and statesman. Guizot was a dominant figure in French politics between the July Revolution and the Revolution of 1848.

A conservative liberal who opposed the attempt by King Charles X to usurp legislative power, he worked to sustain a constitutional monarchy following the July Revolution of 1830. He then served the "citizen king" Louis Philippe I, as Minister of Education 1832–37, ambassador to London 1840, Foreign Minister 1840–1847, and finally Prime Minister of France from 19 September 1847 to 23 February 1848.

Guizot's influence was critical in expanding public education, which under his ministry saw the creation of primary schools in every French commune. As a leader of the "Doctrinaires", committed to supporting the policies of Louis Phillipe and limitations on further expansion of the political franchise, he earned the hatred of more left-leaning liberals and republicans through his unswerving support for restricting suffrage to propertied men and supposedly advised those who wanted the vote to "enrich yourselves" (enrichissez-vous) through hard work and thrift.

As Prime Minister, it was Guizot's ban on the political meetings (called the campagne des banquets or the Paris Banquets, which were held by moderate liberals who wanted a larger extension of the franchise) of an increasingly vigorous opposition in January 1848 that catalyzed the revolution that toppled Louis Philippe in February and saw the establishment of the French Second Republic. He is mentioned in the famous opening paragraph of the Communist Manifesto ("a spectre is haunting Europe...") as a representative of the more liberal faction of the counter-revolutionary forces of Old Europe, contrasted with that of the more reactionary forces, Klemens von Metternich. Marx and Engels published that book just days before Guizot's overthrow in the 1848 Revolution.

== Early years ==
Guizot was born at Nîmes to a bourgeois Protestant family.

On 8 April 1794, when François Guizot was 6, his father was executed on the scaffold at Nîmes during the Reign of Terror. From then on, the boy's mother was completely responsible for his upbringing.

Driven from Nîmes by the Revolution, Madame Guizot and her son went to Geneva, where he was educated. In spite of her decided Calvinistic opinions, the theories of Jean-Jacques Rousseau influenced Madame Guizot. A strong Liberal, she even adopted the notion inculcated in Emile that every man ought to learn a manual trade or craft. Guizot learnt carpentry, and succeeded in making a table with his own hands, which is still preserved.

In 1805, he arrived in Paris and he entered at the age eighteen as tutor into the family of M. Stapfer, formerly Swiss minister in France. He soon began to write in a journal edited by Jean-Baptiste-Antoine Suard, the Publiciste. This connection introduced him to the literary society of Paris.

In October 1809, aged twenty-two, he wrote a series review of François-René de Chateaubriand's Martyrs, which won Chateaubriand's approbation and thanks, and he continued to contribute largely to the periodical press. At Suard's he had made the acquaintance of Pauline de Meulan (born 2 November 1773), a contributor to Suard's journal.

Her contributions were interrupted by illness, but immediately resumed and continued by an unknown hand. It was discovered that François Guizot had substituted for her. In 1812 Mademoiselle de Meulan married Guizot. She died in 1827. (An only son, François, born in 1819, died in 1837 of consumption.) In 1828 Guizot married Elisa Dillon, niece of his first wife, and also an author. She died in 1833, leaving two daughters, Henriette (1829–1908), a co-author with her father and prolific writer herself, and Pauline (1831–1874) and a son, Guillaume (1833–1892), who attained some reputation as a scholar and writer. François Guizot and historian François Mignet invented the concept of the bourgeois revolution.

On 15 June 1837, Guizot sat next to the Princess Lieven at a dinner given by the Duc de Broglie. After twenty years as Russian Ambassadress to London, she had separated from her husband and sought refuge in Paris, where from 1835 she had held an increasingly influential salon occasionally attended by Guizot. She had sympathised with him over his son's death earlier in 1837. From 15 June, they formed a close and loving friendship, exchanging over 5000 letters. He was present at her death in Paris in 1856. Her role in supporting and influencing his aims in aristocratic, political and diplomatic circles was considerable, aided by her retaining many contacts in England and her brother being Chief of Secret Police in Russia and a confidant of the Tsar.

During the First French Empire, Guizot, entirely devoted to literary pursuits, published a collection of French synonyms (1809), an essay on the fine arts (1811), and a translation of Edward Gibbon's The History of the Decline and Fall of the Roman Empire, with additional notes, in 1812. These works recommended him to the notice of Louis-Marcelin de Fontanes, grand-master of the University of France, who selected Guizot for the chair of modern history at the Sorbonne in 1812.

He delivered his first lecture (reprinted in his Memoirs) on 11 December of that year. He omitted the customary compliment to the all-powerful emperor, in spite of the hints given him by his patron, but the course which followed marks the beginning of the great revival of historical research in France in the 19th century. He had now acquired a considerable position in Paris society, and the friendship of Royer-Collard and leading members of the liberal party, including the young duc de Broglie.

Absent from Paris at the moment of the fall of Napoleon in 1814, he was at once selected, on the recommendation of Royer-Collard, to serve the government of King Louis XVIII, in the capacity of secretary-general of the ministry of the interior, under the abbé de Montesquiou. Upon the return of Napoleon from Elba he immediately resigned, on 25 March 1815, and returned to his literary pursuits.

== "The Man of Ghent" ==
After the Hundred Days, he returned to Ghent, where he saw Louis XVIII, and in the name of the liberal party pointed out that a frank adoption of a liberal policy could alone secure the duration of the restored monarchy – advice which was ill-received by the king's confidential advisers.

This visit to Ghent was brought up by political opponents in later years as unpatriotic. "The Man of Ghent" was one of the terms of insult frequently used against him in the days of his power. The reproach appears to be wholly unfounded. He was acting not to preserve the failing empire, but to establish a liberal monarchy and to combat the reactionary ultra-royalists.

On the second restoration, Guizot was appointed secretary-general of the ministry of justice under de Barbé-Marbois, but resigned with his chief in 1816. In 1819 he was one of the founders of the Liberal journal Le Courrier français. Again in 1819 he was appointed general director of communes and departments in the ministry of the interior, but lost his office with the fall of Decazes in February 1820.

During these years Guizot was one of the leaders of the Doctrinaires, a small party strongly attached to the charter and the crown, and advocating a policy which has become associated (especially by Émile Faguet) with the name of Guizot, that of the juste milieu, a middle path between absolutism and popular government.

Adhering to the great principles of liberty and toleration, they were sternly opposed to the anarchical traditions of the Revolution. They hoped to subdue the elements of anarchy through the power of a limited constitution based on the suffrage of the middle class and promoted by the literary talents of the time. They were opposed alike to the democratic spirit of the age, to the military traditions of the empire, and to the bigotry and absolutism of the court. The Doctrinaires fell out of influence following the July Revolution in 1830.

In 1820, when the reaction was at its height after the murder of the Duc de Berry, and the fall of the ministry of the duc Decazes, Guizot was deprived of his offices, and in 1822 even his course of lectures were interdicted.

During the succeeding years he played an important part among the leaders of the liberal opposition to the government of Charles X, although he had not yet entered parliament, and this was also the time of his greatest literary activity.

In 1822, he published his lectures on representative government (Histoire des origines du gouvernement représentatif, 1821–1822, 2 vols.; Eng. trans. 1852); also a work on capital punishment for political offences and several important political pamphlets. From 1822 to 1830 he published two important collections of historical sources, the memoirs of the history of England in 26 volumes, and the memoirs of the history of France in 31 volumes, a revised translation, of Shakespeare, and a volume of essays on the history of France. Written from his own pen during this period was the first part of his Histoire de la révolution d'Angleterre depuis Charles I à Charles II (2 vols., 1826–1827; Eng. trans., 2 vols., Oxford, 1838), which he resumed and completed during his exile in England after 1848.

The Martignac administration restored Guizot in 1828 to his professor's chair and to the council of state. During his time at the University of Paris his lectures earned him a reputation as a historian of note. These lectures formed the basis of his general Histoire de la civilisation en Europe (1828; Eng. trans. by William Hazlitt, 3 vols., 1846), and of his Histoire de la civilisation en France (4 vols., 1830).

In January 1830 he was elected by the town of Lisieux to the Chamber of Deputies, and he retained that seat during the whole of his political life. Guizot delivered an address in March 1830 calling for greater political freedom in the Chamber of Deputies. The motion passed 221 against 181. Charles X responded by dissolving the Chamber and called for new elections which only strengthened opposition to the throne.

On his return to Paris from Nîmes on 27 July, the fall of Charles X was already imminent. Guizot was called upon by his friends Casimir Perier, Jacques Laffitte, Villemain and Dupin to draw up the protest of the liberal deputies against the royal ordinances of July, while he applied himself with them to control the revolutionary character of the late contest. Personally, Guizot was always of opinion that it was a great misfortune for the cause of parliamentary government in France that the infatuation and ineptitude of Charles X and Prince Polignac rendered a change in the hereditary line of succession inevitable.

Once convinced that it was inevitable, he became one of the most ardent supporters of Louis Philippe. In August 1830 Guizot was made minister of the interior, but resigned in November. He had now joined the ranks of the moderate liberals, and for the next eighteen years was a determined foe of democracy, the unyielding champion of "a monarchy limited by a limited number of bourgeois."

== Minister of King Louis Philippe ==
François Guizot accepts the charter from Louis-Philippe, the "Citizen-King".

In 1831 Casimir Périer formed a more vigorous and compact administration, terminated in May 1832 by his death; the summer of that year was marked by a formidable republican rising in Paris, and it was not until 11 October 1832 that a stable government was formed, in which Marshal Soult was first minister, Victor, 3rd duc de Broglie took the foreign office, Adolphe Thiers the home department, and Guizot the department of public instruction.

Guizot, however, was already unpopular with the more advanced liberal party. He remained unpopular all his life. Yet never were his great abilities more useful to his country than while he filled this office of secondary rank but of primary importance in the department of public instruction. The duties it imposed on him were entirely congenial to his literary tastes, and he was master of the subjects they concerned. He applied himself in the first instance to carry the law of 28 June 1833, which established and organized primary education in France.

The branch of the Institute of France known as the Académie des Sciences Morales et Politiques, which had been suppressed by Napoleon, was revived by Guizot. Some of the old members of this learned body – Talleyrand, Sieyès, Roederer and Lakanal – again took their seats there, and a host of more recent celebrities were added by election for the free discussion of the great problems of political and social science. The Société de l'histoire de France was founded for the publication of historical works, and a vast publication of medieval chronicles and diplomatic papers was undertaken at the expense of the state.

The July Monarchy was threatened in 1839 by Louis-Mathieu Molé, who had formed an intermediate government. Guizot and the leaders of the left centre and the left, Thiers and Odilon Barrot worked together to stop Molé. Victory was secured at the expense of principle, and Guizot's attack on the government gave rise to a crisis and a republican insurrection. None of the three leaders of that alliance took ministerial office, and Guizot was not sorry to accept the post of ambassador in London, which withdrew him for a time from parliamentary contests. This was in the spring of 1840, and Thiers succeeded shortly afterwards to the ministry of foreign affairs.

Guizot was received with distinction by Queen Victoria and by London society. His literary works were highly esteemed, and he was sincerely attached to the alliance of the two nations and the cause of peace. He also secured the return of Napoleon's ashes to France at the insistence of Thiers.

As he himself remarked, he was a stranger to England and a novice in diplomacy; the embroiled state of the Syrian War question, on which the French government had separated itself from the joint policy of Europe, and possibly the absence of entire confidence between the ambassador and the minister of foreign affairs, placed him in an embarrassing and even false position. The warnings he transmitted to Thiers were not believed. The treaty of 15 July was signed without his knowledge and executed against his advice. For some weeks Europe seemed to be on the brink of war, until the king ended the crisis by refusing his assent to the military preparations of Thiers, and by summoning Guizot from London to form a ministry and to aid his Majesty in what he termed "ma lutte tenace contre l'anarchie."

== The second Soult government ==
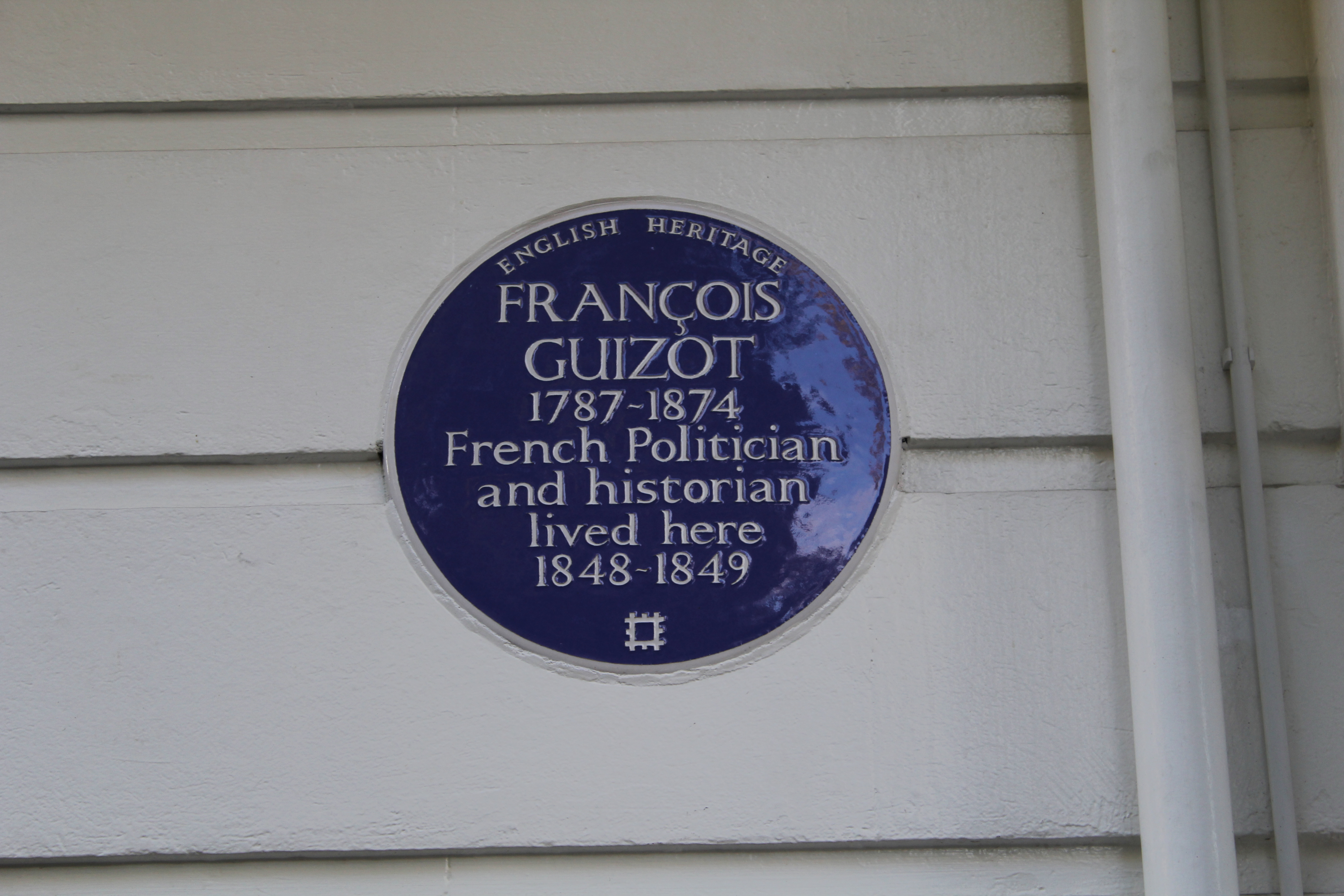
Blue plaque, 21 Pelham Crescent, London SW7

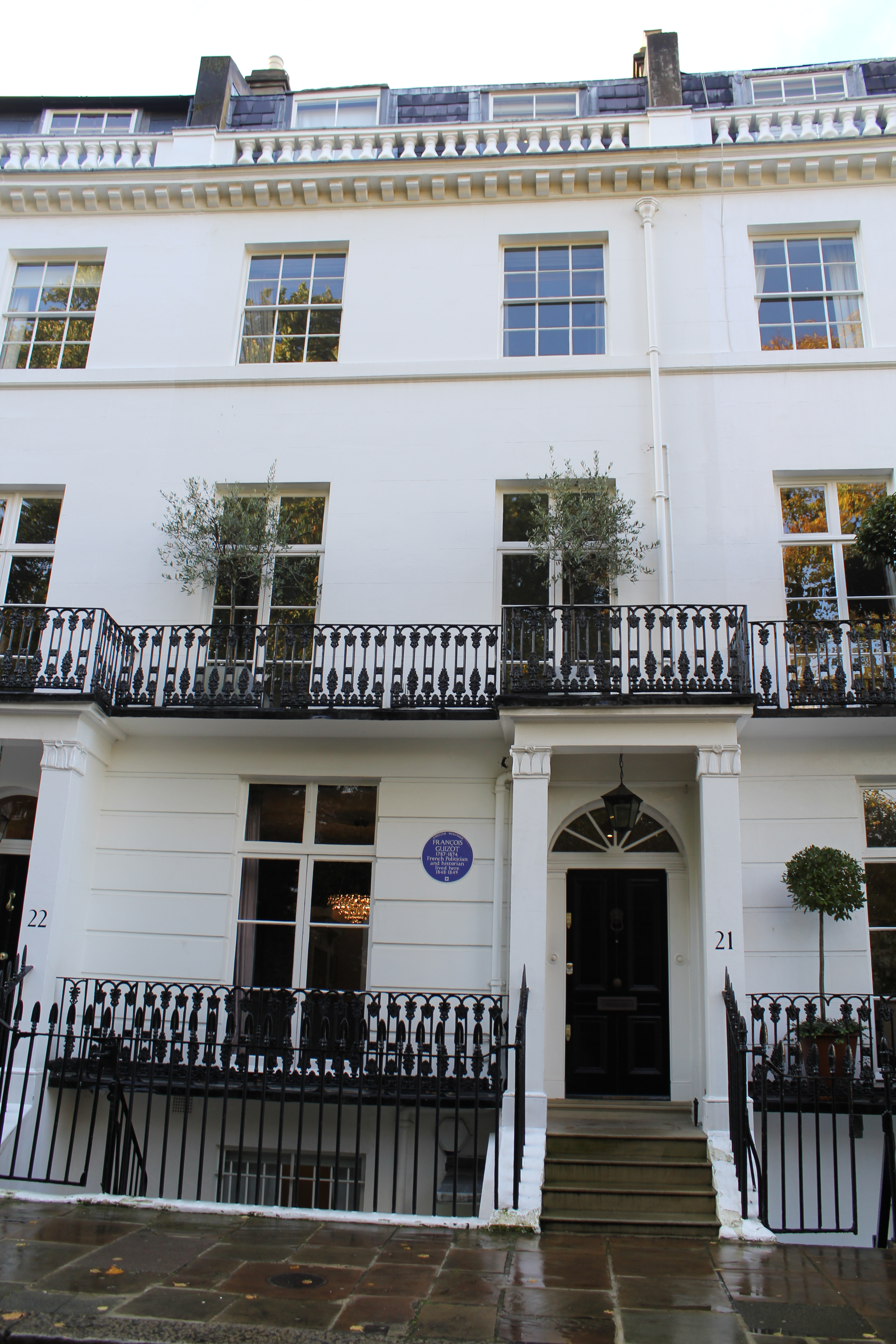
Guizot's house whilst refugee in London 1848-49, 21 Pelham Crescent, London SW7

Thus began, under dark and adverse circumstances, on 29 October 1840, the important administration in which Guizot remained the master-spirit for nearly eight years. He himself took the office of minister for foreign affairs, and upon the retirement of Marshal Soult, he became prime minister. His first care was the maintenance of peace and the restoration of amicable relations with the other powers of Europe. His success gave unity and strength to the moderate liberal party, who now felt that they had a great leader at their head.

During Guizot's tenure as foreign minister, he and Lord Aberdeen, the foreign secretary to Sir Robert Peel, carried on well, and thus they secured France and Britain in the entente cordiale. Part of the formation of the entente came about when Guizot secured the transfer of Napoleon's ashes from St. Helena to the French government.

The opposition in France denounced Guizot's foreign policy as basely subservient to England. He replied in terms of unmeasured contempt: "You may raise the pile of calumny as high as you will; you will never reach the height of my disdain! (Vous n'arriverez jamais a la hauteur de mon dédain!") In 1845 British and French troops fought side by side for the first time in the Anglo-French blockade of the Río de la Plata.

The fall of Peel's government in 1846 changed these intimate relations; and the return of Palmerston to the foreign office led Guizot to believe that he was again exposed to the passionate rivalry of the British cabinet. A friendly understanding had been established between the two courts with reference to the future marriage of the young queen of Spain. The language of Lord Palmerston and the conduct of Sir Henry Bulwer (afterwards Lord Dalling) at Madrid led Guizot to believe that this understanding was broken, provoking the Affair of the Spanish Marriages after Guizot came to believe that Britain intended to place a Coburg on the throne of Spain.

Determined to resist any such intrigue, Guizot and the king plunged headlong into a counter-intrigue, wholly inconsistent with their previous engagements to Britain and fatal to the happiness of the queen of Spain. By their influence she was urged into a marriage with a despicable offset of the house of Bourbon, and her sister was at the same time married to the youngest son of the French king, in direct violation of Louis Philippe's promises. This transaction, although it was hailed at the time as a triumph of the policy of France, was in truth as fatal to the monarch as it was discreditable to the minister. It was accomplished by a mixture of secrecy and violence.

It was defended by subterfuges. Its immediate effect was to destroy the Anglo-French alliance, and to throw Guizot into closer relations with the reactionary policy of Metternich and the Northern courts.

His first object as prime minister was to unite and discipline the moderate liberal party, which had been broken up by previous dissensions and ministerial changes. In this he entirely succeeded by his courage and eloquence as a parliamentary leader, and by the use of all those means of influence which France supplied to a dominant minister. No one ever doubted the purity and disinterestedness of Guizot's own conduct. He despised money; he lived and died poor; and though he encouraged the fever of money-getting in the French nation, his own habits retained their primitive simplicity. But he did not disdain to use in others the baser passions from which he was himself free. Some of his instruments were mean; he employed them to deal with meanness after its kind.

In 1846, the opposition accused the government of buying the votes of the electorate. Guizot acknowledged that corruption happened but the government could not really prevent it. Non-voters exaggerated the occurrences of corruption to point to their need for enfranchisement. Guizot utterly failed to satisfy the demand for expansion of suffrage.

Some scholars point out that corruption, while certainly present, did not have a large effect on the voting records of those in the Chamber of Deputies.

The strength of Guizot's oration was his straightforward style of speaking. He was essentially a ministerial speaker, far more powerful in defence than in opposition. He was also a master of parliamentary tactics. His confidence in himself, and in the majority of the chamber which he had moulded to his will, was unbounded. The long success and the habit of authority led him to forget that in a country like France there were people outside the chamber elected by a small constituency, to which the minister and the king himself were held responsible.

Guizot's view of politics was essentially historical and philosophical. His tastes and his acquirements gave him little insight into the practical business of administrative government. Of finance he knew nothing; trade and commerce were strange to him; military and naval affairs were unfamiliar to him; all these subjects he dealt with by second hand through his friends, Pierre Sylvain Dumon (1797–1870), Charles Marie Tanneguy, Comte Duchâttel (1803–1867), or Marshal Bugeaud. The consequence was that few measures of practical improvement were carried by his administration. Still less did the government lend an ear to the cry for parliamentary reform.

On this subject the king's prejudices were insurmountable, and his ministers had the weakness to give way to them. It was impossible to defend a system which confined the suffrage to 200,000 citizens and returned a chamber of whom half were placemen. Nothing would have been easier than to strengthen the moderate liberal party by attaching the suffrage to the possession of land in France, but blank resistance was the sole answer of the government to the moderate demands of the opposition. Warning after warning was addressed to them in vain by friends and by foes alike, and they remained profoundly unconscious of their danger till the moment when it overwhelmed them.

== 1848 Revolution ==
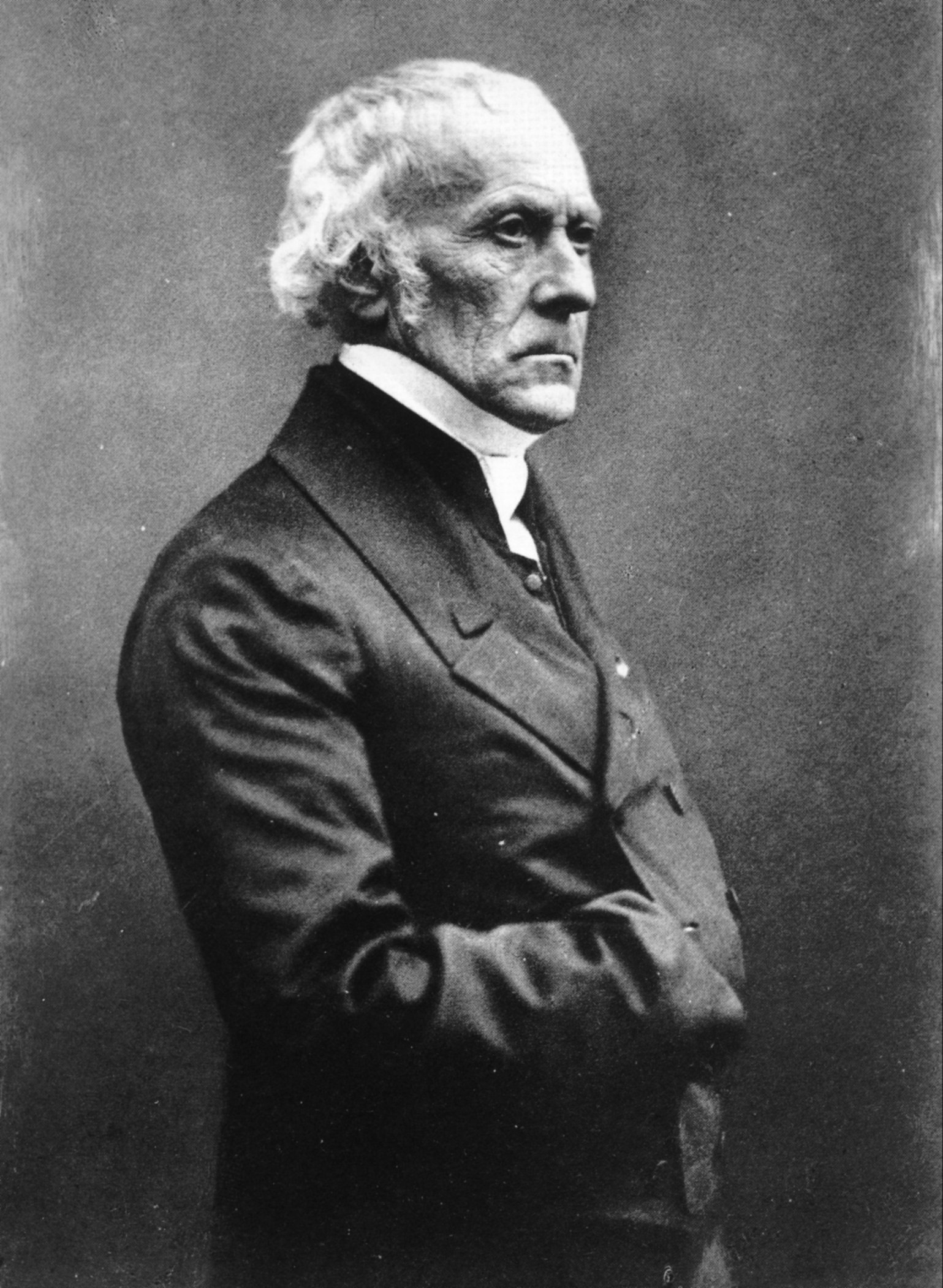
Portrait by Nadar, c. 1857

In the afternoon of 23 February 1848, King Louis-Philippe summoned Guizot from the chamber, which was then sitting, and informed him that considering the situation in Paris and elsewhere in the country during the Banquet agitation for electoral reform, and the alarm and division of opinion in the royal family, led him to doubt whether he could retain Guizot as his prime minister. Guizot instantly resigned, returning to the chamber only to announce that the administration was at an end and that the king had sent for Louis-Mathieu Molé.

Molé failed in the attempt to form a government, and between midnight and one in the morning Guizot, who had according to his custom retired early to rest, was again sent for to the Tuileries. The king asked his advice. "We are no longer the ministers of your Majesty," replied Guizot; "it rests with others to decide on the course to be pursued. But one thing appears to be evident: this street riot must be put down; these barricades must be taken; and for this purpose my opinion is that Marshal Bugeaud should be invested with full power, and ordered to take the necessary military measures, and as your Majesty has at this moment no minister, I am ready to draw up and countersign such an order." The marshal, who was present, undertook the task, saying, "I have never been beaten yet, and I shall not begin to-morrow. The barricades shall be carried before dawn."

Adolphe Thiers and Barrot decided to withdraw the troops. Guizot found a safe refuge in Paris for some days in the lodging of a humble miniature painter whom he had befriended, and shortly afterwards escaped across the Belgian frontier and from there to London, where he arrived on 3 March. His mother and daughters had preceded him, and he was speedily installed in a modest habitation in Pelham Crescent, Brompton.

The society of England, though many people disapproved of much of his recent policy, received the fallen statesman with as much distinction and respect as they had shown the king's ambassador in 1840. A professorship at Oxford was spoken of, which he was unable to accept. He stayed in England about a year, devoting himself again to history. Back in Paris in 1850, Guizot published two more volumes on the English revolution -- Pourquoi la Révolution d'Angleterre a-t-elle reussi? and Discours sur l'histoire, de la Révolution d'Angleterre. In February 1850 Karl Marx and Frederick Engels co-wrote a critical assessment of this two-volume history.

== Later life ==
After having resigned as Prime Minister of France, he left politics. He was aware that the link between himself and public life was broken forever, and he never made the slightest attempt to renew it. The greater part of the year he spent at his residence at Val Richer, a former cistercian monastery near Lisieux in Normandy, which had been sold at the time of the first Revolution. His two daughters married two descendants of the patrician family De Witt of Amsterdam, not be confused with the illustrious Dordrecht family De Witt of former Grand Pensionary Johan de Witt. Both where so congenial in faith and manners to the Huguenots of France, kept his house. One of his sons-in-law farmed the estate. Guizot devoted his later years with undiminished energy to literary labour, which was in fact his chief means of subsistence.

In 1854, Guizot published his Histoire de la république d'Angleterre et de Cromwell (2 vols., 1854), then his Histoire du protectorat de Cromwell et du rétablissement des Stuarts (2 vols., 1856). He also published an essay on Peel, and amid many essays on religion, during the ten years 1858–1868, appeared the extensive Mémoires pour servir à l'histoire de mon temps, in nine volumes. His speeches were included in 1863 in his Histoire parlementaire de la France (5 vols. of parliamentary speeches, 1863).

As his grandchildren grew up around him, he began to teach them French history. From these lessons sprang his last work, the Histoire de France racontée à mes petits enfants. The history came down to 1789, and was continued to 1870 by his daughter Madame Guizot de Witt from her father's notes.

=== Learned societies ===
Two institutions may be said even under the Second Empire to have retained their freedom: the Institut de France and the Protestant Consistory. In both of these Guizot continued to the last to take an active part. He was a member of three of the five academies into which the Institute of France is divided. The Academy of Moral and Political Science owed its restoration to him, and he became in 1832 one of its first associates. The Academy of Inscriptions and Belles Lettres elected him in 1833 as the successor to Dacier. In 1836, he was selected as a member of the Académie Française, the highest literary distinction of the country. In these learned bodies Guizot continued for nearly forty years to take a lively interest and to exercise a powerful influence. He was a keen advocate of their independence. His voice had the greatest weight in the choice of new candidates; the younger generation of French writers never looked in vain to him for encouragement, and his constant aim was to maintain the dignity and purity of the profession of letters. In 1842, he was elected a foreign member of the Royal Swedish Academy of Sciences, and a foreign honorary member of the American Academy of Arts and Sciences in 1855.

=== Protestant Consistory ===
In the consistory of the Protestant church in Paris Guizot exercised a similar influence. His early education and his experience of life conspired to strengthen the convictions of a religious temperament. He remained throughout his life a firm believer in the truths of revelation, and a volume of Meditations on the Christian Religion was one of his latest works. But though he adhered inflexibly to the church of his fathers and combated the rationalist tendencies of the age, which seemed to threaten it with destruction, he retained not a tinge of the intolerance or asperity of the Calvinistic creed. He respected in the Church of Rome the faith of the majority of his countrymen, and the writings of the great Catholic prelates, Bossuet and Bourdaloue, were as familiar and as dear to him as those of his own persuasion, and were commonly used by him in the daily exercises of family worship.

== Death and legacy ==
Down to the summer of 1874 Guizot's mental vigour and activity were unimpaired. He died peacefully, and is said to have recited verses of Pierre Corneille and texts from the Bible on his death-bed.

During the 1820s, Guizot was among the darlings of the European liberal intelligentsia. His historical works such as Histoire générale de la civilisation en Europe (1828) and Histoire de la civilisation en France (1830) were widely admired by thinkers including John Stuart Mill ("I have dinned into people's ears that Guizot is a great thinker and writer"), Johann Wolfgang von Goethe ("Guizot is a man after my own heart...He possesses deep knowledge, combined with an enlightened liberality"), Charles Sainte-Beuve ("this astonishing man about whom one could say so many things"), and Alexis de Tocqueville. In 1840, he was elected as a member to the American Philosophical Society.

Guizot's later resolute opposition to universal suffrage has led his critics to argue that he was a conservative or even reactionary. However, it is more accurate to describe Guizot as a proponent of the juste milieu or political centrism that defended representative government against absolutism and the excesses of democracy. His doctrine of the sovereignty of reason was intended as a liberal strategy to divide and limit sovereignty, and to consolidate the constitutional gains of the Charter of 1814. He likewise called for the abolition of capital punishment. His ideas influenced subsequent liberal reformers throughout Europe such as József Eötvös in Hungary, Johan Rudolph Thorbecke in the Netherlands, and José Ortega y Gasset in Spain.

In recent years, the scholarship of Pierre Rosanvallon, Larry Siedentop, Ivo Mosley and Aurelian Crăiuțu has renewed interest in Guizot's political thought and the Doctrinaires more generally.

== Works ==
- Dictionnaire des synonymes de la langue française, 1809.
- De l'état des beaux-arts en France, 1810.
- Annales de l'éducation, 1811–1815, 6 vol.
- Vie des poètes français du siècle de Louis XIV, 1813.
- Quelques idées sur la liberté de la presse, 1814.
- Du gouvernement représentatif de l'état actuel de la France, 1816.
- Essai sur l'état actuel de l'instruction publique en France, 1817.
- Du gouvernement de la France depuis la Restauration. Des conspirations et de la justice politique, 1820.
- Des moyens de gouvernement et d'opposition dans l'état actuel de la France. Du gouvernement de la France et du ministère actuel. Histoire du gouvernement représentatif en Europe, 1821, 2 vol.
- De la souveraineté, 1822.
- De la peine de mort en matière politique, 1822.
- Essai sur l'histoire de France du Ve s. au Xe s., 1823.
- Histoire de Charles Ier, 1827, 2 vol.
- Histoire générale de la civilisation en Europe, 1828. 2e édition Langlet et Cie, 1838.
- Histoire de la civilisation en France, 1830, 4 vol.
- Le presbytère au bord de la mer, 1831.
- Rome et ses papes, 1832.
- Le ministère de la réforme et le parlement réformé, 1833.
- Essais sur l'histoire de France, 1836.
- Monk, étude historique, 1837.
- De la religion dans les sociétés modernes, 1838.
- Vie, correspondance et écrits de Washington, 1839–1840.
- Washington, 1841.
- Madame de Rumfort, 1842.
- Des conspirations et de la justice politiques, 1845.
- Des moyens de gouvernement et d'opposition dans l'état actuel de la France, 1846.
- Histoire de la révolution d'Angleterre depuis l'avènement de Charles Ier jusqu'à sa mort, 1846.
- M. Guizot et ses amis. De la démocratie en France, 1849.
- Pourquoi la révolution d'Angleterre a-t-elle réussi ? Discours sur l'histoire de la révolution d'Angleterre, 1850.
- Études biographiques sur la révolution d'Angleterre. Études sur les beaux-arts en général, 1851.
- Shakespeare et son temps. Corneille et son temps, 1852.
- Abélard et Héloïse, 1853.
- Édouard III et les bourgeois de Calais, 1854.
- Histoire de la république d'Angleterre, 1855, 2 vol., Sir Robert Peel.
- Histoire du protectorat de Cromwell et du rétablissement des Stuarts, 1856, 2 vol.
- Mémoires pour servir à l'histoire de mon temps, 1858–1867, 8 vol.
- L'Amour dans le mariage, 1860.
- L'Église et la société chrétienne en 1861, Discours académique, 1861.
- Un projet de mariage royal, 1862.
- Histoire parlementaire de France, recueil de discours, 1863, 5 vol. Trois générations.
- Méditations sur l'essence de la religion chrétienne, 1864.
- Guillaume le Conquérant, 1865.
- Méditations sur l'état actuel de la religion chrétienne, 1866.
- La France et la Prusse responsables devant l'Europe, 1868.
- Méditations sur la religion chrétienne dans ses rapports avec l'état actuel des sociétés et des esprits. Mélanges biographiques et littéraires, 1868.
- Mélanges politiques et historiques, 1869.
- L'Histoire de France : depuis les temps les plus reculés jusqu'en 1789. Racontée à mes petits-enfants, 1870–1875, 5 vol.
- Le duc de Broglie, 1872.
- Les vies de quatre grands chrétiens français, 1873.
- L'Histoire d'Angleterre : depuis les temps les plus reculés jusqu'à l'avènement de la reine Victoria. Racontée à mes petits-enfants, 1877-1878, 2 vol.

== See also ==
- Aide-toi, le ciel t'aidera
- Le Globe
- Comité des travaux historiques et scientifiques

Political offices
Preceded by Comte de Guernon-Ranville	French Minister of Public Instruction; 31 July – 1 August 1830	Succeeded by Baron Bignon
Preceded by Duc de Broglie	French Minister of the Interior; 1 August – 2 November 1830	Succeeded by Comte de Montalivet
Preceded by Baron Girod de l'Ain	French Minister of Public Instruction; 11 October 1832 – 10 November 1834	Succeeded by Jean-Baptiste Teste
Preceded by Jean-Baptiste Teste	French Minister of Public Instruction; 18 November 1834 – 22 February 1836	Succeeded by Comte Pelet de la Lozère
Preceded by Comte Pelet de la Lozère	French Minister of Public Instruction; 6 September 1836 – 15 April 1837	Succeeded by Narcisse Achille de Salvandy
Preceded by Adolphe Thiers	French Minister of Foreign Affairs; 29 October 1840 – 23 February 1848	Succeeded by Alphonse de Lamartine
Preceded by Nicolas Jean de Dieu Soult	Prime Minister of France; 19 September 1847 – 23 February 1848	Succeeded by Louis-Mathieu Molé
