= François de Chabaud-Latour =

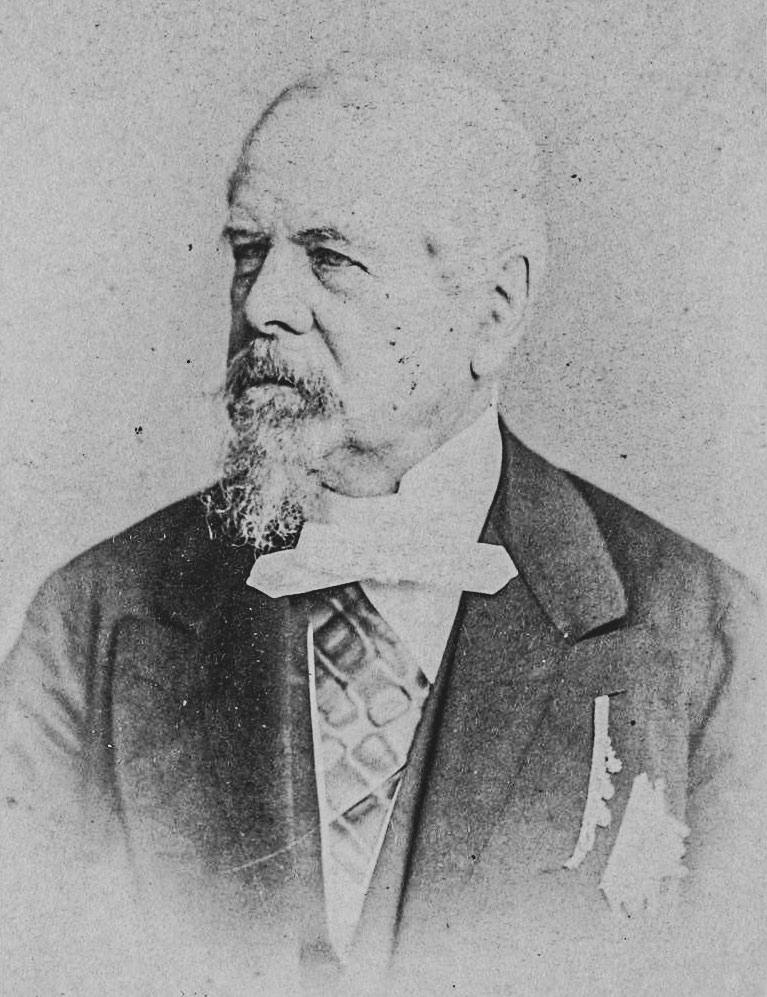
- François de Chabaud-Latour en 1873.
- Born: 25 January 1804; Nîmes
- Died: 10 June 1885
- Resting place: Père Lachaise Cemetery
- Occupation: Politician
- Spouse: Mathilde Joséphine Hélène Perier
- Relatives: Rosine de Chabaud-Latour
- Awards: Grand Cross of the Legion of Honor (1871–); Knight Grand Cross of the Order of the White Eagle; Officer of the Order of Leopold; Commander of the order of Nichan Iftikhar

François-Henri-Ernest, Baron de Chabaud-Latour (25 January 1804 – 10 June 1885) was a French general and politician.

== Biography ==
=== Early life and education ===
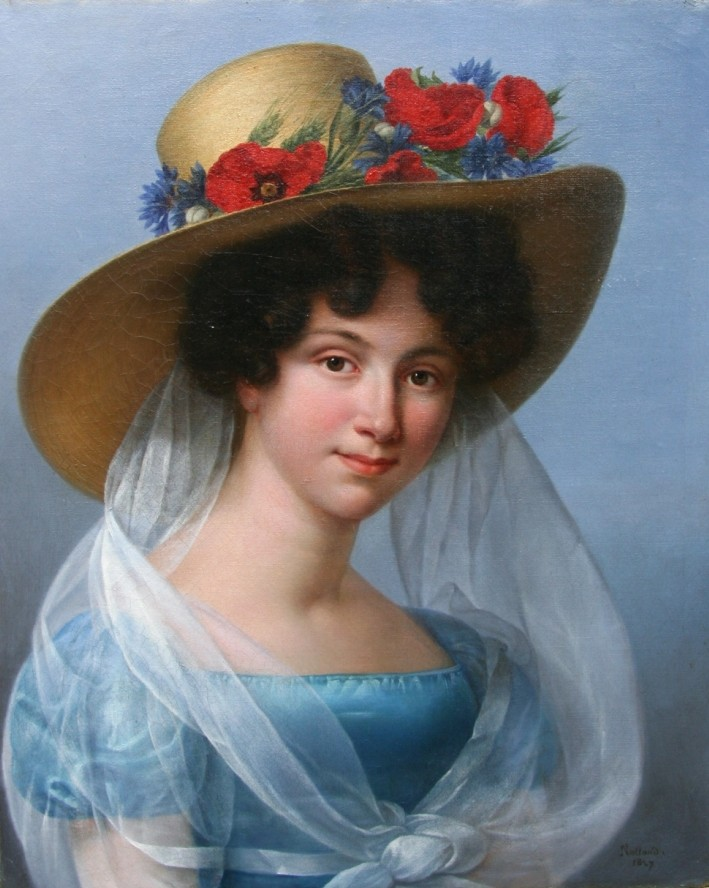
Portrait of Mathilde Josephine Hélène Perier, Baronne de Chabaud-Latour by Benjamin de Rolland, 1827

François-Henri-Ernest, Baron de Chabaud-Latour, was born on 25 January 1804, in Nîmes, France. He was the son of Antoine Georges François de Chabaud-Latour and the nephew of Henri Verdier de Lacoste. In 1820, he entered the École polytechnique, a prestigious engineering school in France. He graduated seventh in his class in 1822 and chose to join the engineering branch of the military. He ranked first in his class at the École d'application du génie in Metz.

=== First military and political career ===
At the age of twenty-two, Chabaud-Latour became a captain in the engineering corps. In 1829, he participated, along with Russian army officers, in the sieges of fortified places along the Danube. He was then called to serve in the Polignac ministry in Paris.

In 1830, he volunteered for the expedition to Algeria and was decorated for his participation in the bombardment of Fort l'Empereur and the occupation of Blida.

Chabaud-Latour later became an aide-de-camp to the Duke of Orléans and accompanied him in the Belgian campaign and the siege of Antwerp. He also took part in various campaigns in Algeria in 1837, 1839, and 1840, participating in engagements at Sig, Habra, Mascara, and the expedition of the Iron Gates in 1839, for which he was awarded the Legion of Honour. In 1840, he fought in the battles of Médéa, El-Affroun, the Col de Mouzaïa, and Bois des Oliviers. He remained the aide-de-camp of the Duke of Orléans until the Prince's death in 1842.

A supporter of the July Monarchy, Chabaud-Latour was elected as a deputy for Gard on 4 November 1837. In the Chamber, he consistently aligned with the government majority and supported the liberal-conservative policies of Guizot. He was reelected in 1839, 1842, 1845, and 1846.

In 1840, the question of fortifying Paris arose. Chabaud-Latour was tasked with the preliminary project and proposed the construction of a continuous fortified enclosure, along with a belt of advanced forts, to protect the population from the rigours of a siege. As a deputy, he personally defended the project in the Chamber and obtained its approval. As the chief engineer in Belleville, he was then responsible for the execution of the construction works for the eastern part of the Parisian fortifications.

Promoted to lieutenant colonel in 1842 and colonel in 1845, he was appointed commander of the 3rd Regiment of Engineers in Arras in 1846.

During the French Revolution of 1848, Chabaud-Latour was among the Orléanist officers ready to resist. On 24 February 1848, he placed himself at the disposal of the Duchess of Orléans, and when there was an attempt to save the dynasty by appointing the duchess as regent, he lifted the Count of Paris in his arms and showed him to the people. Following the abdication of the king, he resigned from the army. After a few weeks on leave, he was recalled to the direction of engineering in Amiens. After the coup d'état of 2 December 1851, he was fully reinstated and stationed in Grenoble.

In 1852, he assumed the position of senior commander of engineering in Algeria, where he was quickly promoted to brigadier general in 1853. He spent five years there, participating in expeditions to Babors in 1853, Beni-Iuya in 1854, Guetchoula in 1855, and the Great Kabylie in 1857. These campaigns led to his promotion to divisional general in 1858. During his time in Algeria, he demonstrated his planning skills by constructing the road from Tizi-Ouzou to Souk El Arba in just sixteen days. In four months, he also built Fort-Napoléon in the heart of the territory of the Beni Raten tribe. He was also involved in the construction of hydraulic dams and the establishment of several villages.

In 1858, he was called back to Paris to participate in the Committee of Fortifications, the General Inspection of Strongholds, the Engineer Regiments, and the École Polytechnique, as well as the Advisory Committee for Algerian Affairs. During the war in Italy, he commanded the Corps of Engineers stationed for observation on the Eastern border. He was promoted to the rank of Grand Officer of the Legion of Honour in 1861, became the president of the Committee of Fortifications in 1864, and entered the reserve framework on 25 January 1869.

Chabaud-Latour died in Paris on 10 June 1885, at the age of 81.

Notes and references
