= Henriette Guizot de Witt =

French writer

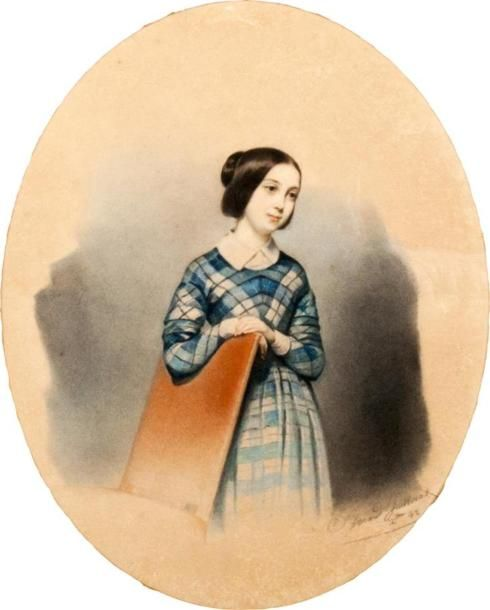
Portrait of Henriette Guizot, 1842 by Clotilde Gérard-Juillerat

Henriette Guizot de Witt (August 6, 1829 in Paris – 1908 in Paris) was a French writer who wrote under the name Mme de Witt, née Guizot.

== Family ==
Henriette Guizot de Witt was the daughter of the historian and politician François Guizot and the wife of Conrad de Witt. She was the sister of Guillaume Guizot. Her younger sister Pauline married Cornélis Henri de Witt, Conrad de Witt's brother. One of Henriette's daughters was the pronatalist and feminist activist Marguerite de Witt-Schlumberger.

== Works ==
In order to support family finances, Henriette Guizot de Witt composed some one hundred novels and educational texts of moralized history, such as Légendes et récits pour la jeunesse (1876), Scènes historiques (five series, 1875–85), Les chroniques de l'histoire de France jusqu'au XIVe siècle (4 volumes 1882-85). She also translated Shakespeare and Charles Dickens into French.
