= Guillaume Guizot =

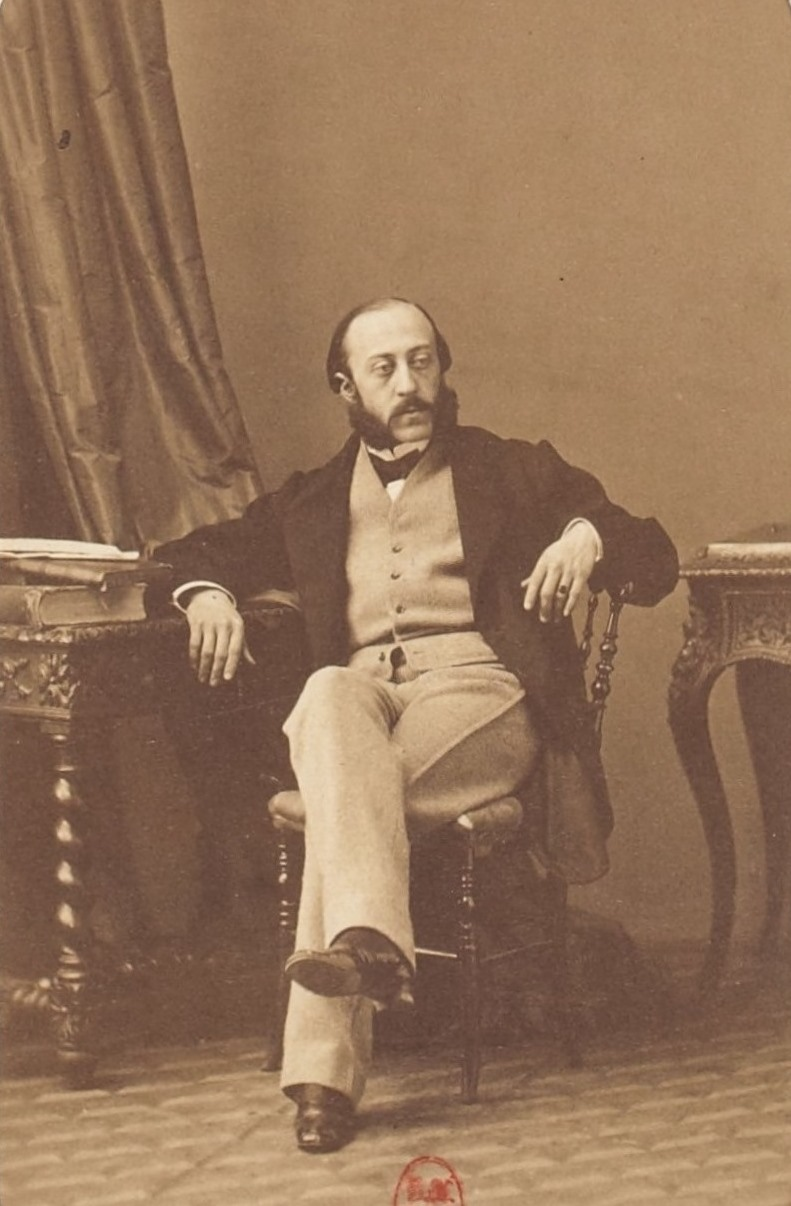
Guillaume Guizot

Guillaume-Maurice Guizot (English: /ɡiːˈzoʊ/ gee-ZOH, French: [ɡijom mɔʁis ɡizo]; 11 January 1833 - 23 November 1892) was a French essayist, translator, professor of literature and civil servant.

== Biography ==
Guillaume was the son of historian and politician François Guizot and his second wife Élisa Dillon. He was the brother of Henriette Guizot de Witt.
