= La Réforme =

Political newspaper in 19th-century France

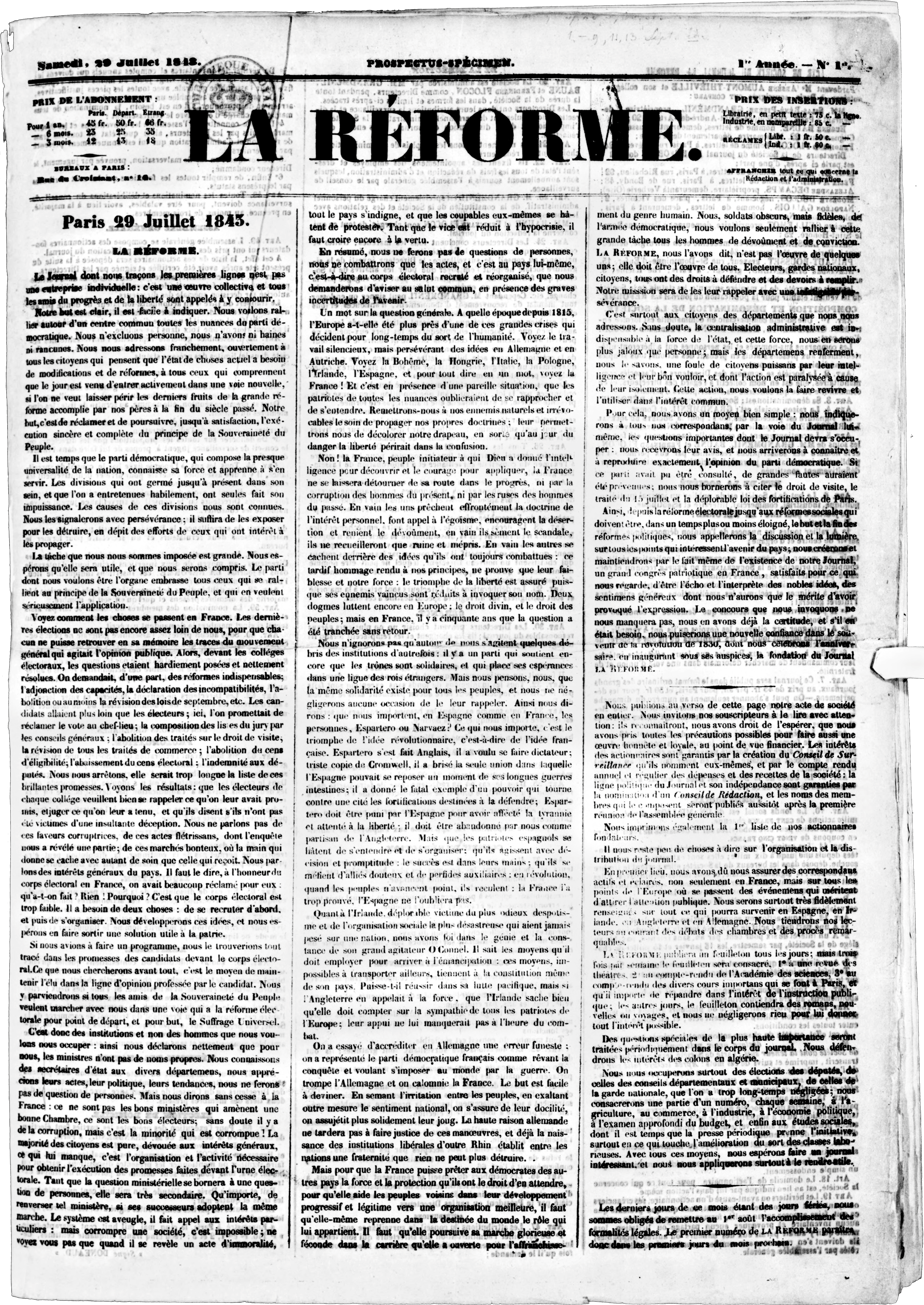
Title page of the first issue

La Réforme was a French political newspaper of the mid-19th century. Founded in Paris on 29 July 1843 by Alexandre Ledru-Rollin, the newspaper had a left-wing, radical liberal, and republican editorial line. It also published some early socialist works. Its regular contributors included the radicals Étienne Arago, Godefroy Cavaignac, and Victor Schœlcher and the early socialists Louis Blanc, Pierre Leroux, and Félix Pyat. The socialist figures Pierre-Joseph Proudhon, Karl Marx, and Mikhail Bakunin also published articles. The editor was Ferdinand Flocon.

Members of the newspaper were part of the provisional government of 1848, who led the Second Republic in the spring of 1848.

In February 1848, Charles Ribeyrolles became the editor to replace Ferdinand Flocon. However, after the demonstration at the Arts-et-Métier on 13 June 1849, Ribeyrolles was tried in absentia by the High Court of Justice of Versailles. On the run, he escaped police and gave Senator Pierre Joigneaux instructions for the management of the newspaper during his absence, which he hoped would be short.

It ceased publication in January 1850.

The circulation was 1698 copies in 1845 and 1860 copies in 1846.
