= Wittke =

Wittke is a German surname that has several origins. Notable persons with the surname include:

- Axel Wittke (born 1960), German football player
- Eva Wittke (born 1951), German Olympic swimmer; wife of Jochen Herbst, mother of Sabine Herbst
- Gudrun Baudisch-Wittke (1907–1982), an Austrian ceramist, sculptor and painter, a member of the Wiener Werkstätte
- Harald Schroeter-Wittke (born 1961), a German practical theologian
- Jens Wittke (born 1964), German footballer
- Manfred Wittke (born 1953), a German football player
- Oliver Wittke (born 1966), German politician
- Thomas Wittke, the real name of Wittek (born 1964), a German comic artist and illustrator
- Volker Wittke (1957–2012), a German sociologist
- Walter Wittke

== See also ==
- Veith
- Wittich, Wittig
- Witt (disambiguation), Witte
- Witke
