= DeWitt =

De Witt is Dutch for "The White". De Witt, DeWitt or Dewitt may refer to:

== People and fictional characters ==
- DeWitt (name), including a list of people and fictional characters with the given name or surname
- De Witt (surname), a list of people
  - De Witt (family), a patrician family from the Dutch Golden Age

== Places ==
=== Australia ===
- De Witt Island, Tasmania, Australia

=== United States ===
- DeWitt, Arkansas
- DeWitt, Illinois, a village in DeWitt County
- DeWitt Township, DeWitt County, Illinois
- DeWitt County, Illinois
- DeWitt, Iowa
- DeWitt, Michigan, a city in Clinton County
- DeWitt Charter Township, Michigan, in Clinton County
- De Witt, Missouri
- De Witt, Nebraska
- DeWitt, New York
- DeWitt County, Texas
- DeWitt, Virginia
- Dewitt, West Virginia

== Other uses ==
- DeWitt Motor Company, early 20th century US automobile company
- DeWitt notation, mathematical notation
- DeWitt Clause, usage restrictions in software licenses, named for computer scientist David DeWitt

== See also ==
- de Wit
- de Witte (disambiguation)
