= DeWitt (name) =

DeWitt or Dewitt is a concatenated primarily American form of the Dutch surname De Witt or De Wit, both meaning "the white [one]" or "the blond [one]". It also became a popular given name following the New York Governorship of DeWitt Clinton, whose mother Mary DeWitt was a descendant of the Dutch patrician De Witt family. People with the name include:

== Surname ==
- Bill DeWitt (1902–1982), American baseball executive
- Bill DeWitt III (born ca. 1968), American baseball executive
- Blake DeWitt (born 1985), American baseball player
- Bryce DeWitt (1923–2004), American physicist known for the Wheeler–DeWitt equation and the DeWitt notation, brother of Hugh Hamilton DeWitt
- Cali DeWitt (born 1973), American artist
- Cécile DeWitt-Morette (1922–2017), French mathematician and physicist
- Charles DeWitt (1727–1787), delegate to the Continental Congress of United States
- Charles B. DeWitt (born 1950), American Director of the National Institute of Justice
- Charles G. DeWitt (1789–1839), U.S. Representative from New York
- Dale DeWitt (born 1950), Oklahoma politician
- David DeWitt, American computer science professor
- Doug DeWitt (born 1961), American boxer
- George DeWitt (1922–1979), American singer and comedian
- Green DeWitt (1787– 1835), American empresario in Mexican Texas
- Helen DeWitt (born 1957), American novelist
- Hugh Hamilton DeWitt (1933-1995) American ichthyologist, marine biologist and oceanographer, brother of Bryce DeWitt
- Jason DeWitt, American poker player
- Jerry DeWitt (born 1969), American author and public speaker
- John DeWitt (athlete) (1881–1930), American track and field athlete
- John DeWitt (gridiron football) (born 1970), American arena football player
- John H. DeWitt Jr. (1906–1999), American radio broadcasting pioneer
- John L. DeWitt (1880–1962), American general
- Joyce DeWitt (born 1949), American actor
- Keegan DeWitt (born 1982), American film composer, singer-songwriter and actor
- L. G. DeWitt (1912–1990), American NASCAR team owner
- Lew DeWitt (1938–1990), American country musician and singer, member of The Statler Brothers
- Lincoln DeWitt (born 1967), American skeleton racer
- Lydia Maria Adams DeWitt (1859–1928), American pathologist and anatomist
- Matt DeWitt (born 1977), American baseball player
- Nellie Jane DeWitt (1895–1978), United States Navy Nurse Corps officer
- Patrick deWitt (born 1975), Canadian novelist and screenwriter
- Philip Elmer-DeWitt (born 1949), American writer and editor
- Renee Dewitt (born 1986), American model
- Richard W. DeWitt (1838–1909), American Civil War soldier
- Robert L. DeWitt (died 2003), American Episcopal bishop
- Rocky DeWitt, American politician from Iowa
- Roscoe DeWitt (1894–1975), American architect
- Rosemarie DeWitt (born 1974), American actress
- S.A. "Sam" DeWitt (1891–1963), American poet and socialist politician
- Theresa DeWitt (born 1963), (born 1963), American sport shooter
- William DeWitt Jr. (born 1941), American businessman
- William Henry DeWitt (1827–1896), Tennessee politician

== Given name ==
- DeWitt Clinton Baxter (1829–1881), American artist and engraver
- DeWitt Clinton Blair (1833–1915), American philanthropist and industrialist
- DeWitt Bodeen (1908–1988), American screenwriter
- DeWitt Clinton (1769–1828), Governor of New York 1817–1822 and 1825–1828
- DeWitt Coffman (1854–1932), United States Navy admiral
- DeWitt "Tex" Coulter (1924–2007), American football player
- DeWitt Sanford Dykes Sr. (1903–1991), American architect, Methodist minister
- Dewitt Ellerbe (born 1981), American football player
- DeWitt H. Fessenden (1885–1952), American architect, critic, sketch artist, and author
- De Witt Clinton Flanagan (1870–1903), U.S. Representative from New York
- Dewitt Clinton Giddings (1827–1903), U.S. Representative from Texas
- DeWitt Godfrey (born 1960, American sculptor
- Dewitt Clinton Haskin (c.1824–1900), American civil engineer
- DeWitt Hale (1917-2018), American lawyer and politician
- DeWitt Henry (born 1941), American author and editor
- DeWitt Hyde (1909–1986), U.S. Representative from Maryland
- DeWitt Clinton Jansen (1840–1894), American hotelier
- DeWitt Jennings (1871–1937), American film and stage actor
- DeWitt John (1915-1985), American journalist, editor, and author
- DeWitt Jones, American football coach
- Dewitt Jones (born 1943), American photojournalist
- Dewitt Clinton Leach (1822–1909), Michigan politician and newspaperman
- Dewitt Clinton Lewis (1822–1899), American Civil War soldier
- DeWitt Clinton Littlejohn (1818–1892), Speaker of the New York Assembly 1855, 1857 and 1859–1861
- DeWitt Menyard (1944–2009), American basketball player
- Dewitt Miller (1857–1911), American orator and book collector
- R. DeWitt Miller (1910–1958), American science fiction writer
- Dewitt H. Parker (1885–1949), American philosopher
- DeWitt Peck (1894–1973), United States Marine Corps Major general
- DeWitt Stetten Jr. (1909–1990), American biochemist
- De Witt Sumners (born 1941), American mathematician
- T. De Witt Talmage (1832–1902), American religious leader
- DeWitt Wallace (1889–1981), American co-founder of Reader's Digest
- DeWitt Webb (1840–1917), American physician, politician, and amateur naturalist
- DeWitt Weaver (1912–1998), American football player and coach
- DeWitt Weaver (golfer) (1939–2021), American golfer, son of above
- DeWitt Williams (1919–2016), South Carolina politician
- DeWitt Clinton Wilson (1827–1895), Wisconsin politician

== Fictional characters ==
- Abby DeWitt, character from the Under the Dome TV series
- Addison DeWitt, character from the drama film All About Eve
- Alexandra DeWitt, character from the Green Lantern DC Comics series
- Anna DeWitt, birth name of the main character Elizabeth from the BioShock Infinite video game, biological daughter of Booker
- Booker DeWitt, the player protagonist of the BioShock Infinite video game
- Dewitt, an anthropomorphic frog from the animated TV series Will and Dewitt
- Emmett DeWitt, character from the film 10 Cloverfield Lane
- Kearson DeWitt, Marvel Comics supervillain
- Morgan DeWitt, character from the soap opera The Bold and the Beautiful
- Rose DeWitt Bukater, female protagonist of the film Titanic
- Xander Dewitt, main character from the film Bixler High Private Eye

== See also ==
- DeWitt (disambiguation)
- De Wit (surname)
- DeWitte (surname)
