= WITS =

WITS or Wits may refer to:

== Acronym ==
- Wales Interpretation and Translation Service, a Welsh not-for-profit organisation
- Water Industry Telemetry Standard, a communications protocol
- Wellsite Information Transfer Specification, used by the petroleum industry
- Women in Technology and Science, an Irish organisation
- Workshop on Information Technologies and Systems, an academic conference on information systems
- World Integrated Trade Solution, a trade database provided by the World Bank
- Worldwide Incidents Tracking System, a discontinued publicly accessible terrorism database
- Worldwide Industrial Telemetry Standards, a suite of public utility protocols

== Arts and entertainment ==
- The Wits, a 17th-century English comedy play by Sir William Davenant
- The Wits, a 17th-century collection of comic sketches by Francis Kirkman
- the title school of WITS Academy, a 2015 teen sitcom on Nickelodeon

== Other uses ==
- Herman Wits (1636–1708), Dutch theologian
- Bidvest Wits F.C., a South African football club
- University of the Witwatersrand, Johannesburg, South Africa
- WITS (AM), an AM radio station in Sebring, Florida

== See also ==
- Wit (disambiguation)
- Witts, a surname
- Witz (disambiguation)
