= DeWitt Township =

DeWitt Township may refer to the following places in the United States:

- DeWitt Township, DeWitt County, Illinois
- De Witt Township, Clinton County, Iowa
- DeWitt Charter Township, Michigan
- De Witt Township, Carroll County, Missouri
- De Witt Township, Perkins County, South Dakota

== See also ==
- DeWitt (disambiguation)
