= Witek =

Witek is a Polish surname. Notable people with the surname include:

- Adam Witek (1928-2013), Polish gliding
- Elżbieta Witek (born 1957), Polish politician
- Frank P. Witek (1921–1944), United States Marine
- Kate Witek, American politician
- Melissa Witek (born 1981), American actress, model and beauty queen
- Mickey Witek (1915–1990), American professional baseball player
- Terri Witek, American poet

== See also ==
- Witke
- Wit (disambiguation)
