= Witts =

Witts is a surname. Notable people with the surname name include:

- Andrew Witts (born 1961), Australian rules footballer
- David Witts (born 1991), British actor and model
- Francis Edward Witts (1783–1854), English clergyman, diarist, and magistrate
- Garry Witts (born 1959), American former basketball player
- George Backhouse Witts (1846–1912), British civil engineer and archaeologist
- Leslie John Witts (1898–1982), British physician

== See also ==
- Witt (disambiguation)
- Wits (disambiguation)
- Witz (disambiguation)
