= Goose Creek Township, Piatt County, Illinois =

Goose Creek Township
- Township
- Location in Piatt County

- Piatt County's location in Illinois
- Coordinates: 40°06′16″N 88°38′21″W
- Country: United States
- State: Illinois
- County: Piatt
- Established: November 8, 1859

Area
  - Total: 56.32 sq mi (145.9 km^{2})
  - Land: 56.3 sq mi (146 km^{2})
  - Water: 0.01 sq mi (0.026 km^{2}) 0.02%
- Elevation: 699 ft (213 m)

Population (2010)
  - Estimate (2016): 767
  - Density: 14/sq mi (5.4/km^{2})
- Time zone: UTC-6 (CST)
  - Summer (DST): UTC-5 (CDT)
- FIPS code: 17-147-30523

Goose Creek Township is a township in Piatt County, Illinois, USA. As of the 2010 census, its population was 790 and it contained 355 housing units.

Ameren's Goose Creek Energy Center, a combustion turbine generator (CTG) power plant, is located in Goose Creek Township.

== Geography ==
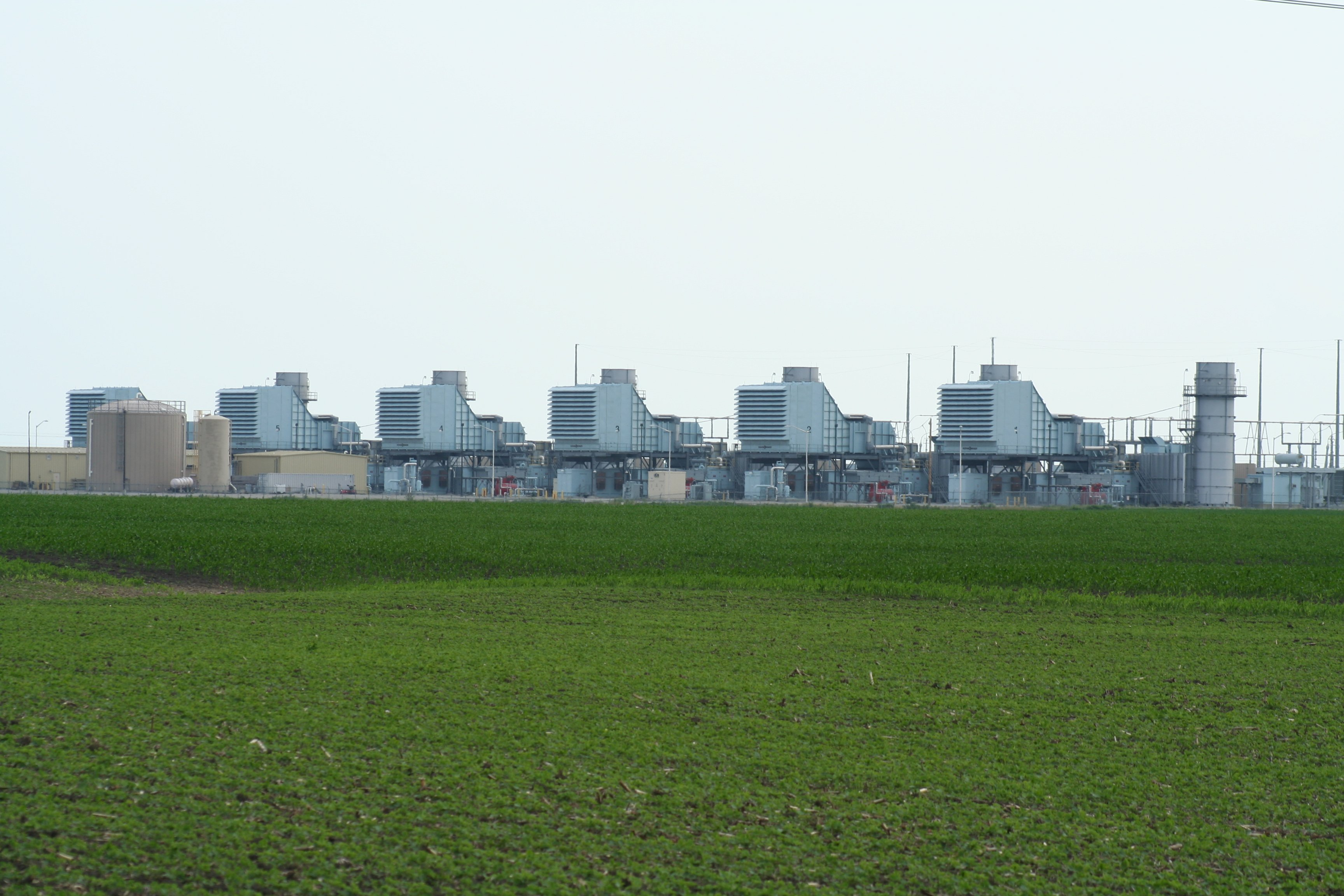
AmerenUE's Goose Creek Energy Center, a natural gas power station, located in the township between Lodge, Illinois and De Land, Illinois. (40.106942°N 88.599281°W)

According to the 2010 census, the township has a total area of 56.32 square miles (145.9 km^{2}), of which 56.3 square miles (146 km^{2}) (or 99.96%) is land and 0.01 square miles (0.026 km^{2}) (or 0.02%) is water.

=== Cities and towns ===
- De Land

=== Adjacent townships ===
- Santa Anna Township, DeWitt County (north)
- Blue Ridge Township (northeast)
- Sangamon Township (east)
- Monticello Township (southeast)
- Willow Branch Township (south)
- Friends Creek Township, Macon County (southwest)
- Nixon Township, DeWitt County (west)
- DeWitt Township, DeWitt County (northwest)

=== Cemeteries ===
The township contains eight cemeteries: Deland, Dillow Family, Dooley Family, Kentuck, Marquiss, Morain, Mosgrove and Old Monticello.

=== Major highways ===
- Illinois State Route 10
- Illinois State Route 48
