= WIT =

Wit is a form of humour.

Wit or WIT may also refer to:

== Arts, entertainment, and media ==
- Wit (play), a 1995 one-act play by American playwright Margaret Edson
  - Wit (film), a 2001 film directed based on the play
- Wit Studio, a Japanese animation studio
- Washington Improv Theater, in Washington, D.C., United States
- Wellington Improvisation Troupe, in Wellington, New Zealand
- W.I.T., an American electroclash group

== Education ==
- Waterford Institute of Technology, in Waterford, Ireland
- Wentworth Institute of Technology, in Boston, Massachusetts, United States
- Wessex Institute of Technology, in Hampshire, United Kingdom
- Western Institute of TAFE, in New South Wales, Australia
- Wufeng Institute of Technology, in Chiayi, Taiwan

== People ==
- Wit Busza, physicist and professor at the Massachusetts Institute of Technology
- Veit Stoss, artist known in Polish as Wit Stwosz
- Antoni Wit (born 1944), Polish conductor
- Dennis Wit (born 1951), American retired soccer player

== Other uses ==
- Wit, any of the five wits or senses in premodern psychology
- WIT, NYSE symbol for Wipro, an Indian IT multinational company
- Wit FM, a French radio station based in Bègles, near Bordeaux
- Time zone in Indonesia:
  - Waktu Indonesia Timur (Eastern Indonesian Time), a time zone covering eastern Indonesia
  - Western Indonesian Time, abbreviated "WIT" in tz database
- Witbier, a popular Belgian ale
- Women in Touch, a women's discussion group in Zimbabwe
- FC WIT Georgia, a football team in the country of Georgia
- Former IATA code for Wittenoom Gorge Airport

== See also ==
- de Wit (surname)
- WITS (disambiguation)
- Witt (disambiguation)
- Wyt (disambiguation)
- Wisecrack (disambiguation)
