= De Witte =

De Witte or Dewitte is Dutch and Flemish for "The White" and may refer to:

- The noble family "de Witte" (from Antwerpen)

== Surname ==
- André de Witte (1944–2021), Belgian bishop in Brazil
- Bruno de Witte (born 1955), Belgian legal scholar
- Charlotte de Witte (born 1992), Belgian techno DJ and record producer
- Chris De Witte (born 1978), Belgian footballer
- Emanuel de Witte (1617–1692), Dutch perspective painter
- Eugen de Witte (1882–1952), Czech politician
- Gaspar de Witte (1624–1681), Flemish painter
- Gaston-François de Witte (1897–1980), Belgian herpetologist
- Hans de Witte (1583–1630), German financier
- Ivan De Witte (born 1947), Belgian entrepreneur and football executive
- Jacob Eduard de Witte (1738–1809), Flemish architect, who designed the fortification of Tallinn
- Jacob DeWitte, American engineer, founder of nuclear reactor company Oklo Inc.
- Jacomina de Witte (1582–1661), Dutch woman central in a famous corruption case
- Jan de Witte (bishop) (1475–1540), Flemish priest, first Bishop of Cuba
- Jan de Witte (1709–1785), Dutch-Polish military engineer and architect
- Jeremy Dewitte (born 1980), American serial police impersonator and sex offender
- Jean de Witte (1808–1889), Belgian archeologist, epigraphist and numismatist
- Léon de Witte de Haelen (1857–1933), Belgian general of World War I
- Laura de Witte (born 1995), Dutch sprinter
- Lisanne de Witte (born 1992), Dutch sprinter
- Lieven de Witte (15th century), Flemish painter
- Lodewijk De Witte (born 1954), Belgian politician, governor of Flemish Brabant
- Ludo De Witte (born 1956), Belgian writer
- Peter de Witte (Peter Candid), (c.1548–1628), Flemish-born painter, tapestry designer and draughtsman
- Peter de Witte III (1617–1667), Flemish Baroque painter
- Pieter de Witte (c. 1548 – 1628), Flemish Mannerist painter and architect
- Ronald De Witte (born 1946), Belgian bicycle racer
- Seth De Witte (born 1987), Belgian footballer
- De Witte family, a Belgian noble family from Antwerp

== See also ==
- Witte
