= De Witt (surname) =

De Witt is a surname of Dutch origin meaning "the white". In America, the name is usually concatenated to DeWitt. Notable people with the surname include:

- De Witt (family), a patrician family from the Dutch Golden Age
  - Andries de Witt (1573–1637), Grand Pensionary of Holland
  - Jacob de Witt (1589–1674), burgomaster of Dordrecht
  - Cornelis de Witt (1623–1672), Dutch politician, brother of Johan
  - Johan de Witt (1625–1672), Grand Pensionary of Holland
  - Johan de Witt Jr. (1662–1701), Dutch bibliophile and politician, son of Johan
- Alexander De Witt (1798–1879), American politician
- Conrad de Witt (1824–1909), French politician
- Cornélis Henri de Witt (1828–1889), French politician
- David M. De Witt (1837–1912), American politician
- Elmo De Witt (died 2011), South African filmmaker
- Francis B. De Witt (1849–1929), American politician
- Henriette Guizot de Witt (1829–1908), French writer
- Jacob De Witt (1785–1859), Canadian politician
- Jacob H. De Witt (1784–1857), American politician
- Marguerite de Witt (1853–1924), French activist, daughter of Conrad and Henriette
- Pauline de Witt (1831–1874), French historian
- Rocky De Witt (1959–2025), American politician
- Simeon De Witt (1756–1834), American cartographer

== See also ==
- DeWitt (name)
- De Wit
- De Witte (disambiguation)
- Witte de With (1599–1658), Dutch naval officer
