= Niemcza =

Town in Lower Silesian Voivodeship, Poland

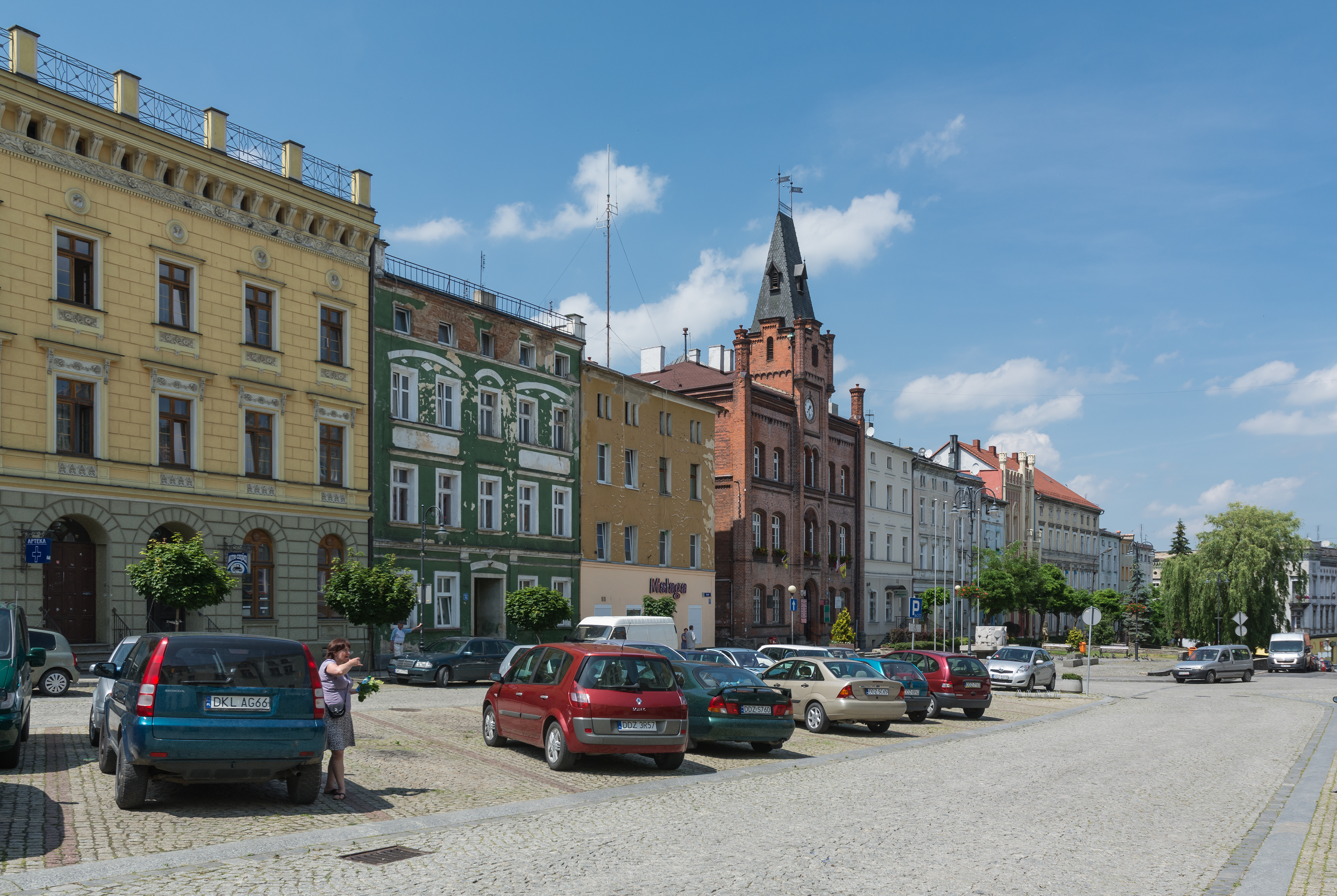
- Market Square (Rynek)

- Flag Coat of arms

- Location within Poland
- Coordinates: 50°43′N 16°50′E
- Country: Poland
- Voivodeship: Lower Silesian
- County: Dzierżoniów
- Gmina: Niemcza
- Town rights: 1282

Government
  - Mayor: Jarosław Węgłowski

Area
  - Total: 19.81 km^{2} (7.65 sq mi)

Population (2019-06-30)
  - Total: 2,965
  - Density: 149.7/km^{2} (387.6/sq mi)
- Time zone: UTC+1 (CET)
  - Summer (DST): UTC+2 (CEST)
- Postal code: 58-230
- Area code: +48 74
- Vehicle registration: DDZ
- Website: https://www.um.niemcza.pl

Niemcza [ˈɲɛmt͡ʂa] (German: Nimptsch) is a town in Dzierżoniów County, Lower Silesian Voivodeship, in south-western Poland. It is the seat of the administrative district (gmina) called Gmina Niemcza.

== History ==
Niemcza is historically one of the most important towns of Silesia. The oldest traces date back to the Bronze Age. Between 1000 and 800 B.C. people of the Lusatian culture fortified the so-called "city hill" and incorporated this fortification into their Silesian defence system. This fort was probably destroyed during a battle against the Scythian around 500 BC. Members of the Germanic Silingi tribe who did not participate in the Migration Period but stayed in Silesia chose the place in the 4th century as their fortified center of a Germanic settlement area between "mons Silencii" (Ślęża) and the river "Selenca" (Ślęza). Slavs arrived after the 6th century and called this place "Nemci" ( = mute, metaphorically "those who do not speak our language"). Thietmar of Merseburg later described "Nemzi" as "eo quod a nostris olim sitcondita, dicta" (Nemzi is called like that because it is, according to reports, founded by our people). The settlement was expanded and evolved into the center of the Ślężanie district.

=== Middle Ages ===
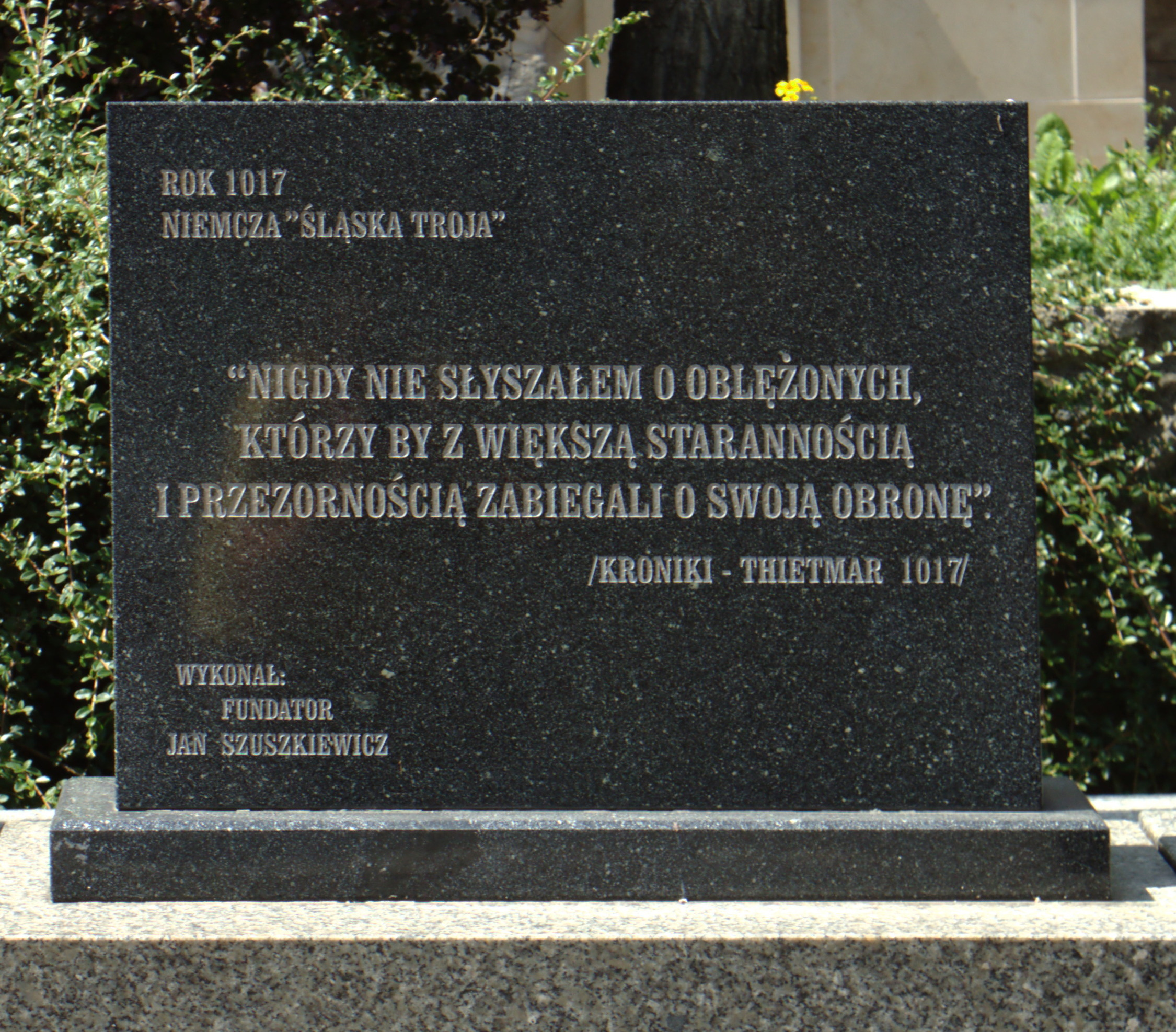
A monument commemorating the Polish defense of Niemcza in 1017 at the Market Square

In early times Niemcza became an important base in Bohemias fight for Silesia. After 990 it was seized by Poland under first historic ruler Mieszko I of Poland and withstood both emperor Henry II. in 1017 (Siege of Niemcza) and a major offensive of Bohemia in 1093. In 1137, the Polish and Czech rulers, Bolesław III Wrymouth and Soběslav I, met in Niemcza. In 1152 the overthrown Polish ruler Władysław II the Exile stayed in Niemcza. After 1155 it became the center of a Piast castellany district. This preurban civitas consisted of a settlement enclosed by imposing ramparts in great-moravian design (the only one in Silesia), the castellany castle with St. Peter chapel, first mentioned in 1288/95, and a market place around St. Adalbert church, one of the oldest churches of Silesia, outside and to the west of the ramparts. The area was surrounded by several manors.

The German Ostsiedlung reached Niemcza and the surrounding area already in 1210. The settlement however grew only slow as the new German town was founded directly on the soil of the cramped old Polish urbs, whereas the more spacious market place around St. Adalbert was remodeled to a village. In 1282, Duke Henry IV Probus granted Niemcza town rights, although it is possible that town rights were granted earlier. Remarkable was the establishment of the parish church of St. Mary, which in 1295 was assigned to both Poles and Germans for shared and separate usage. Before 1300 a new city wall was built, which is in parts preserved. At the same time the wooden castellany castle was replaced by a stone castle, and a city hall was first mentioned in 1474.

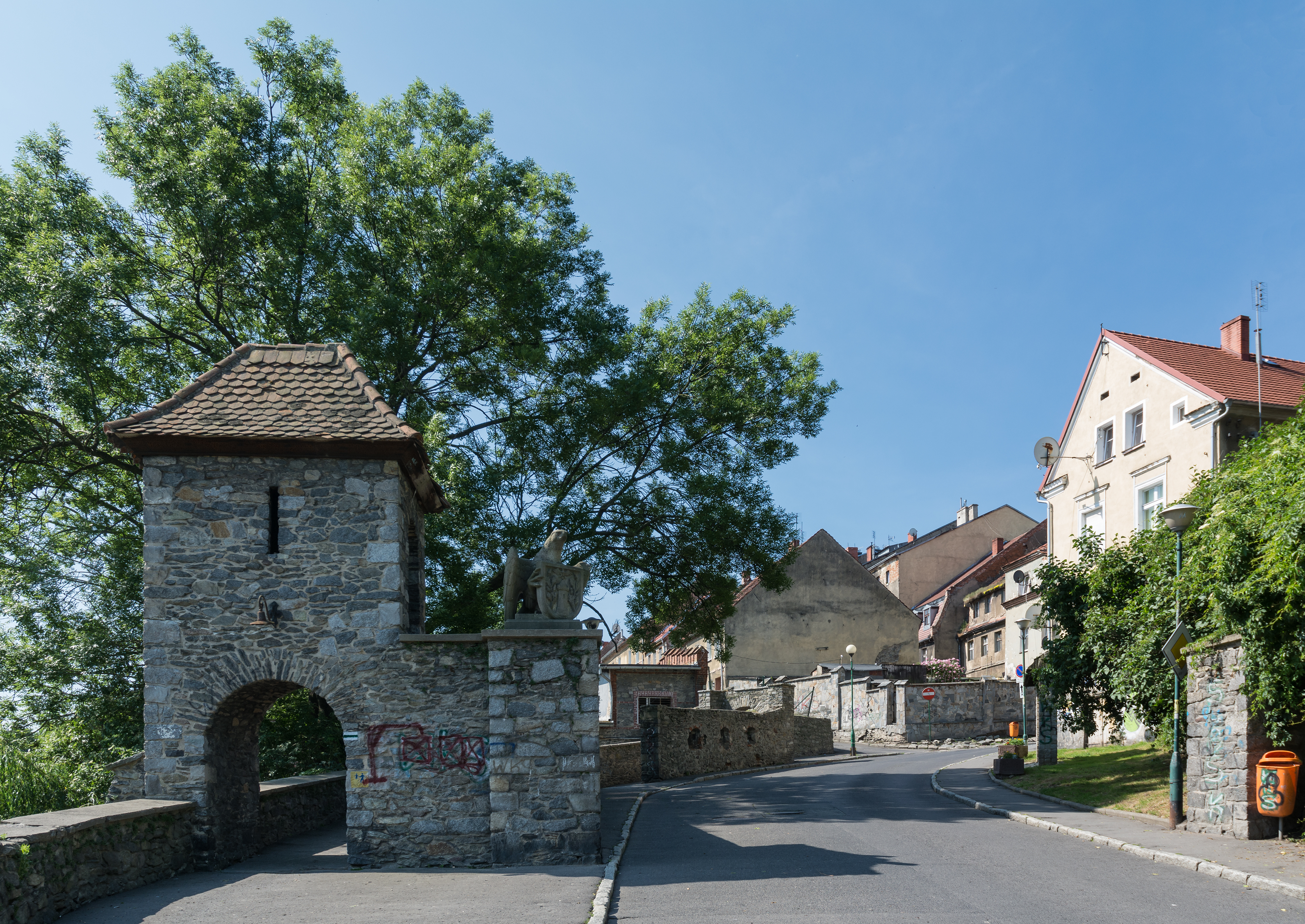
The historical fortifications and gate near the entrance to the Old Town

With the partition of the Duchy of Wrocław in 1311 the town passed to the Duchy of Brzeg. In 1322 both the town and municipal area (Weichbild) became a pledged possession of the Duchy of Świdnica, whose duke Bolko I. used the strategic position of Niemcza in his fight against Bohemia. In 1331 Niemcza was successfully defended during the Czech invasion of King John of Bohemia. After 1392 the duchy of Świdnica was dissolved, Niemcza came back to the duchy of Brzeg, which in 1419 was reunited with the Duchy of Legnica and remained under the rule of the Piast dynasty until 1675, although under Bohemian suzerainty. The Hussites seized Niemcza/Nimptsch in 1430 and held the town for several years. After six unsuccessful sieges it was returned in 1434 and razed to the ground by the burghers of Wrocław. In 1455 duchess Hedwig of Legnica confirmed the town rights of Niemcza.

=== Modern era ===
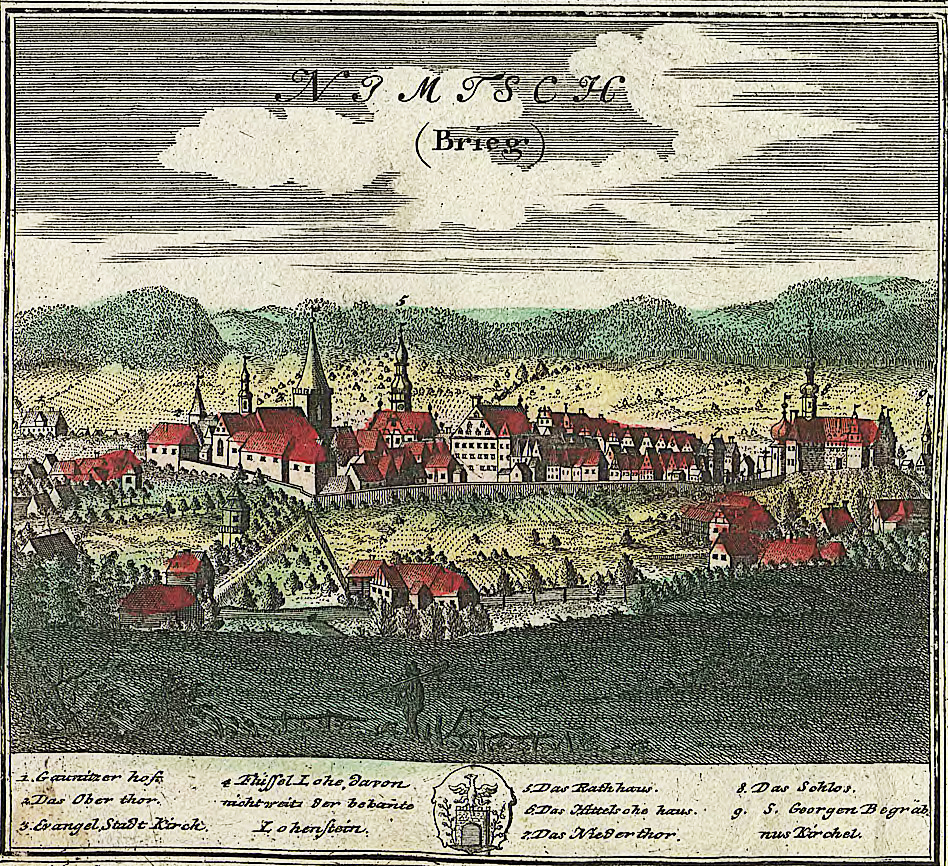
Nimptsch in 1752, drawing by Friedrich Bernhard Werner

In 1481 the administration of the municipal area was moved to Białobrzezie. Nimptsch, which was equipped below average, enclosed by noble properties, on the periphery of the municipal area, in the extreme western corner of the duchy and close to the far more successful foundations of Reichenbach (Dzierżoniów) and Frankenstein (Ząbkowice Śląskie), could never overcome such backlashes. A moderate recovery, marked by the reconstruction of the town wall, the modernisation of the never used, ducal residence, the rebuilding of St. Adalbert as the Protestant church St. George in 1612 and the awarding of several town rights, was stopped by the Thirty Years' War. During the war, in 1625 a plague epidemic broke out, and in the 1630s the town was destroyed and plundered by foreign troops. In 1635 Daniel Casper von Lohenstein was born in the residence, the only building not destroyed during this war. Only 12 out of 103 landlords of Nimpsch survived firestorm and pest. In 1642 the town hall was rebuilt.

The slow rebuilding, with the help of immigrated Bohemians, was again stopped by several major fires, which destroyed the town hall and parts of the residence. After the extinction of the local Piasts in 1675 the Counter-Reformation obtained the tension-filled reestablishment of a Catholic commune. At the same time Nimptsch became a center of sacred music thanks to Protestant cantor Johann Heinrich Quiel.

Historic sights of Niemcza (examples)
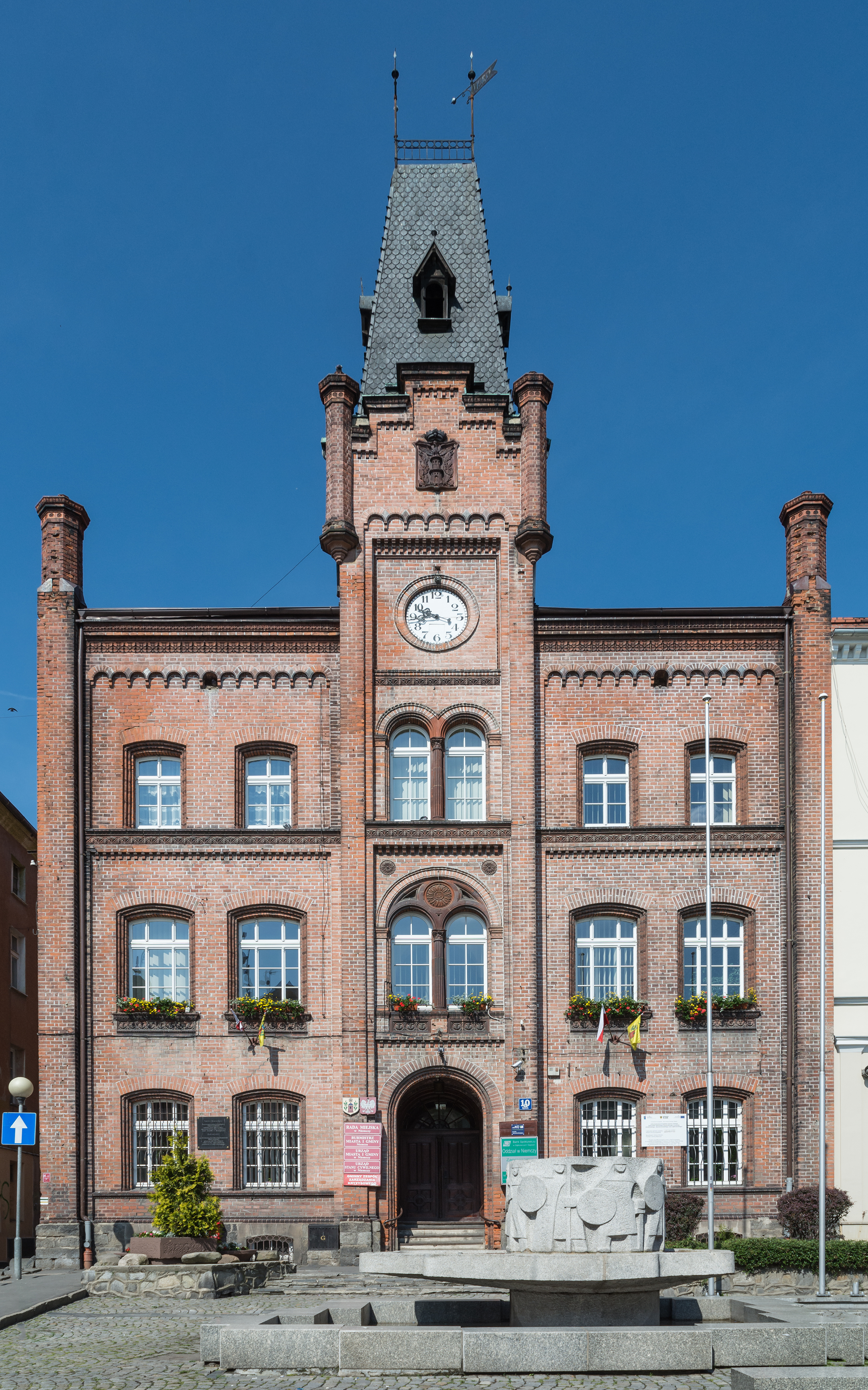
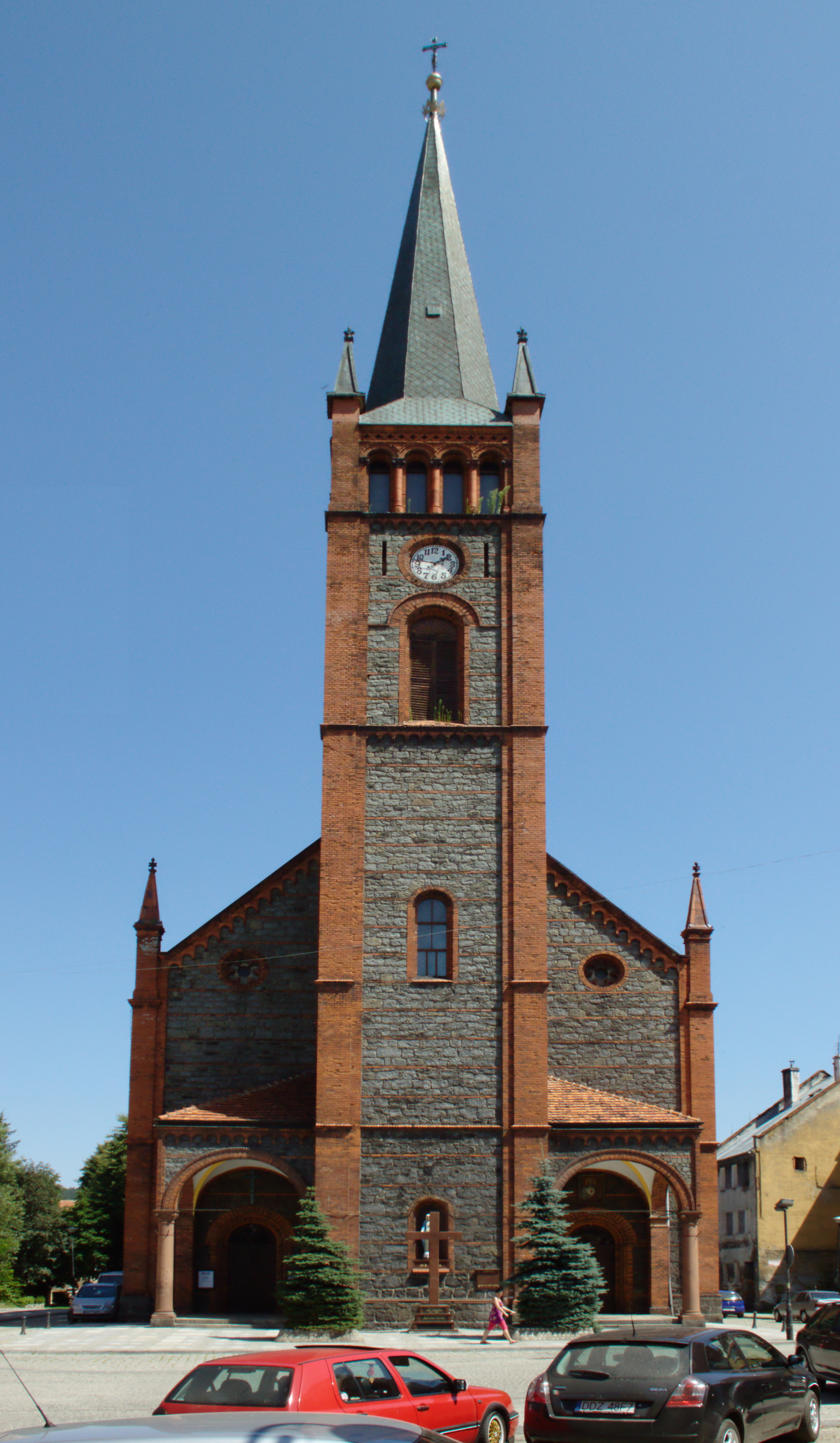
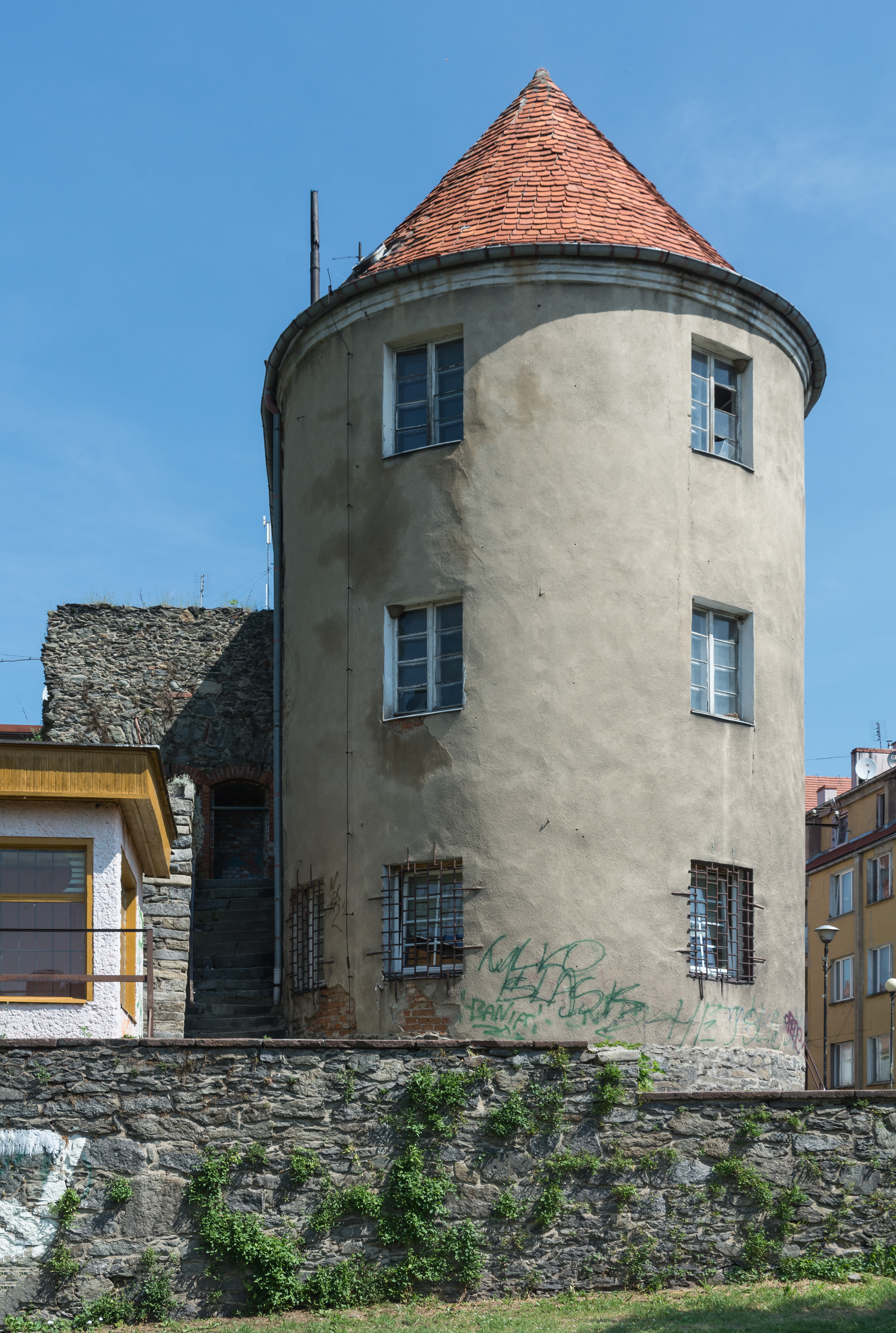
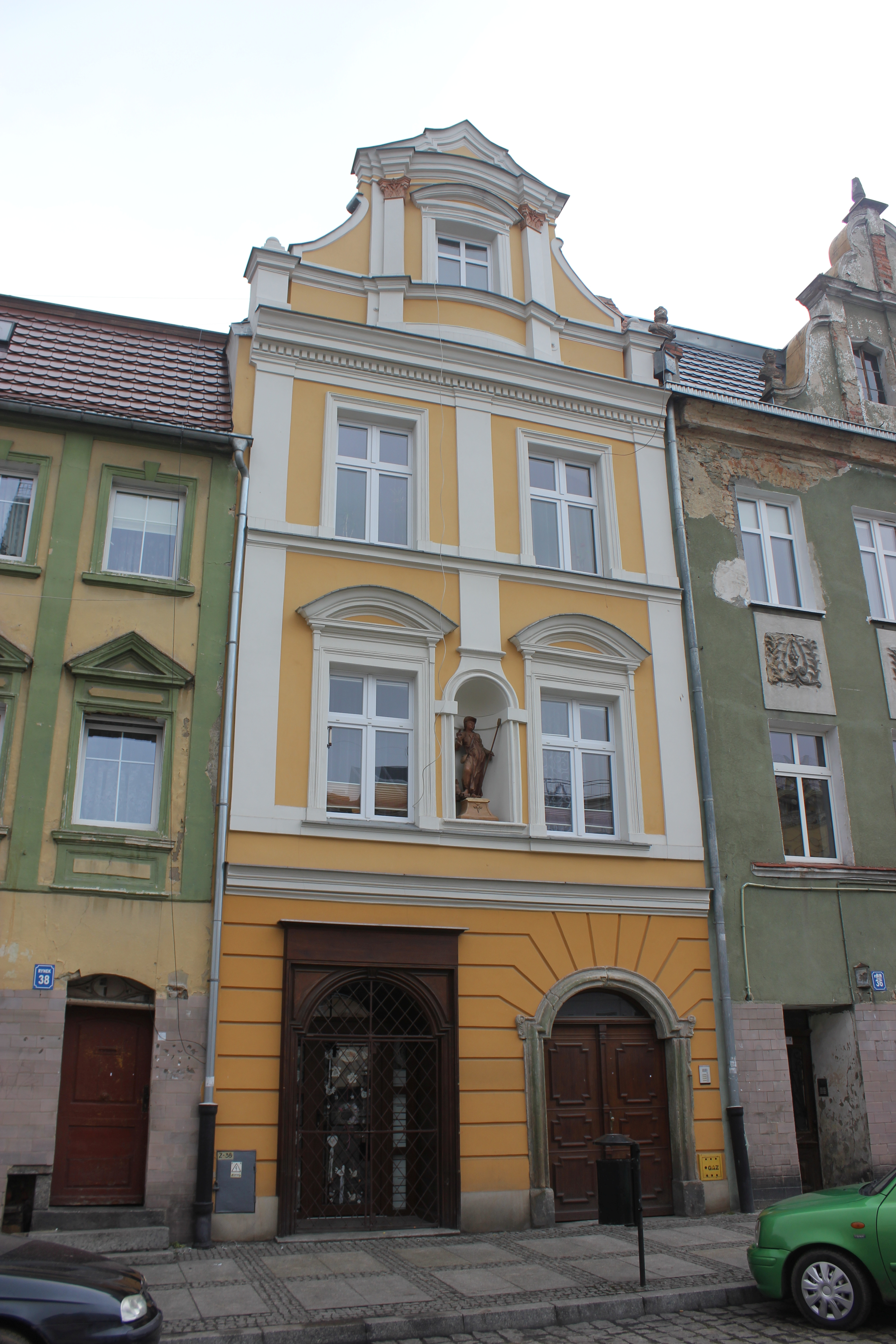
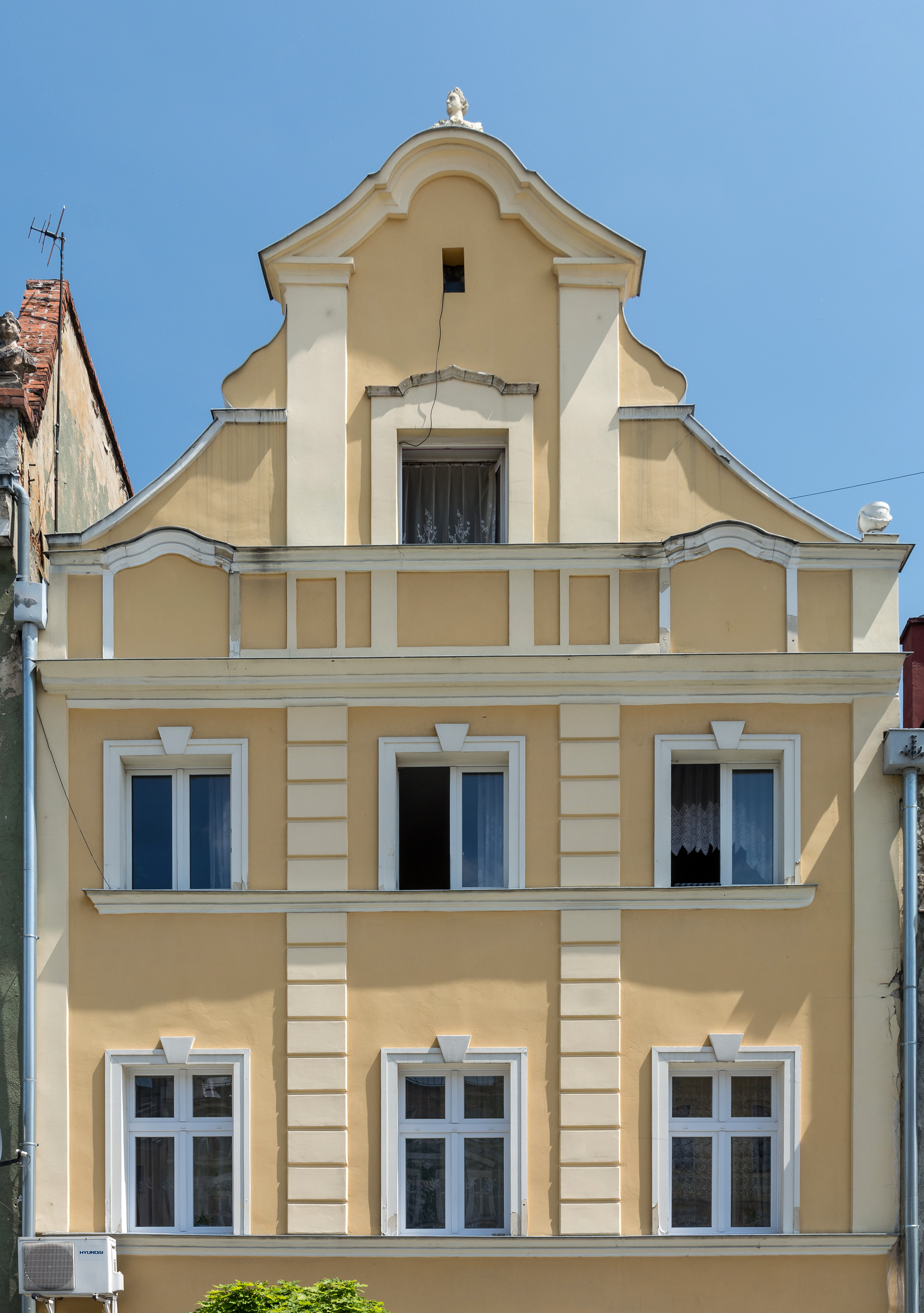
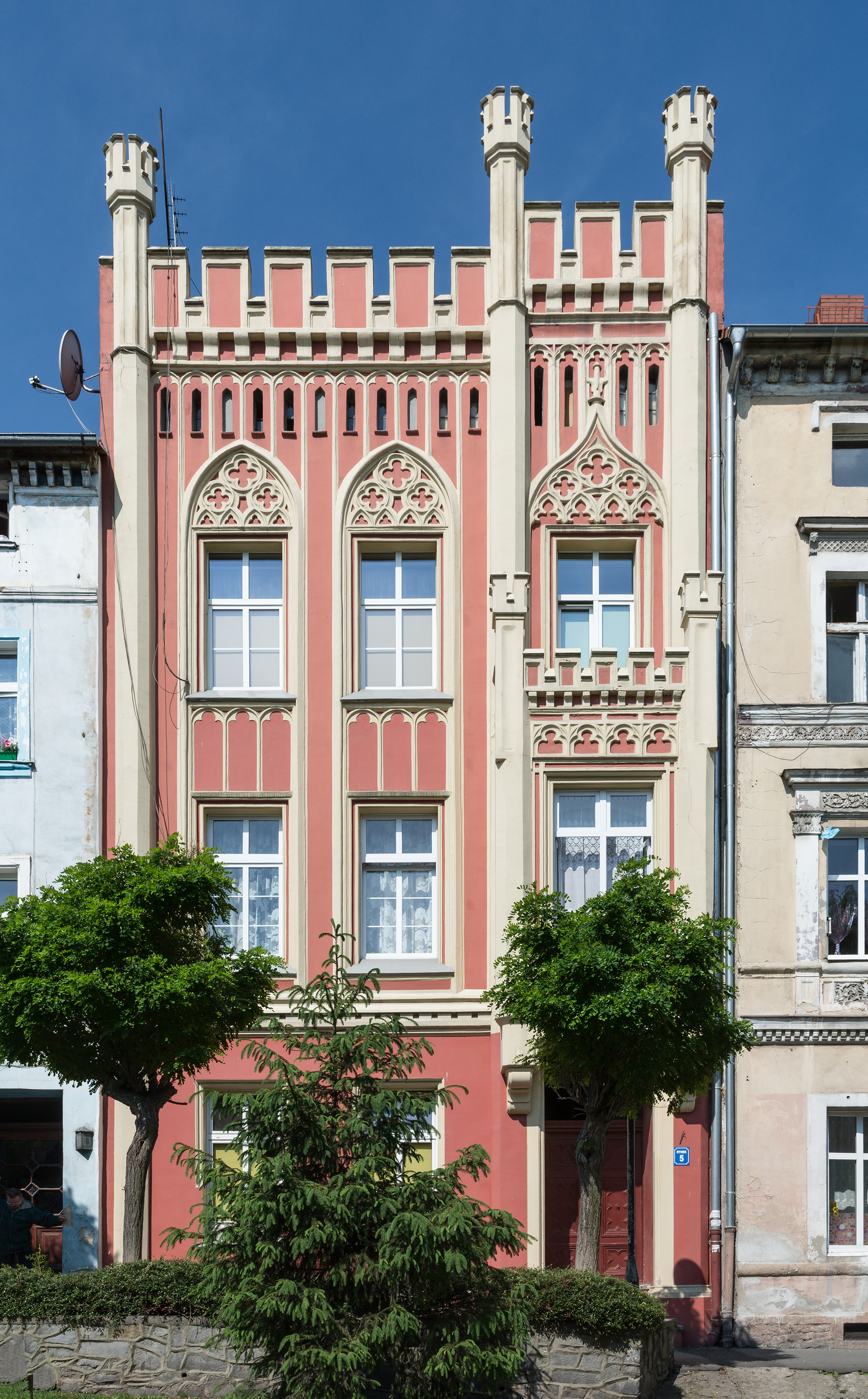
Top, left to right: Town hall, Immaculate Conception church, Tower of the Upper Gate; bottom: historic townhouses at the Market Square

In 1742 it was annexed by Kingdom of Prussia. In 1826 Fryderyk Chopin travelled through the town. In 1832 and 1846, Protestant and Catholic schools were built.

=== 20th century ===
In 1940, the Germans established a forced labour camp in the town, and in 1944 also the AL Nimptsch subcamp of the Groß-Rosen concentration camp, whose prisoners were mostly Poles. After the defeat of Nazi Germany Nimptsch passed again to Poland and the historic Polish name Niemcza was restored. The German inhabitants were expelled and the town was resettled with Poles, many of whom where themselves expelled from former eastern Polish territories, annexed by the Soviet Union. Also Greeks, refugees of the Greek Civil War, settled in Niemcza in the 1950s. The town was not destroyed in World War II. Of the three preserved historical buildings at that time the Renaissance octagon of the residence and the Catholic Church are decayed and demolished. The St. George church is preserved, as well as the late Baroque residential buildings on the market place (Rynek).

From 1975 to 1998 Niemcza was in Wałbrzych Voivodeship. The town suffered in the 1997 Central European flood.

== Population ==
year	population
1740	1150
1787	1256
1825	2182
1905	2216
1939	3523 (16,24 km^{2})
1961	3557 (19,25 km^{2})
1970	3772
2006	3121
2007	3085
2018	2974

== Cuisine ==
The officially protected traditional foods from Niemcza (as designated by the Ministry of Agriculture and Rural Development of Poland) are various meat products, including kiełbasa niemczańska and kiełbasa galicjanka z Niemczy, two local types kiełbasa, szynka wieprzowa niemczańska, a local type of smoked ham, słonina marynowana z Niemczy, a local type of marinated słonina, and home-made Niemcza meat in pieces (mięso w kawałkach niemczańskie domowe), which consists of various types of meat, cut into pieces, marinated with spices, and seasoned with salt, pepper, garlic and herbs.

== Sports ==
The local football team is Niemczanka Niemcza. It competes in the lower leagues. It was the first club of Niemcza native, Poland national football team player, Krzysztof Piątek.

== Notable people ==
- Friedrich von Logau
- Daniel Casper von Lohenstein
- Sigmar Wittig
- Jo Brauner
- Paweł Sibik
- Krzysztof Piatek

== Twin towns – sister cities ==
See the twin towns of Gmina Niemcza.

== Surroundings ==
- Gola Dzierżoniowska Castle
- Cistercian monastery at Henryków
