= De Wit =

Dutch surname

De Wit or de Wit is a surname of Dutch origin meaning "the white (one)", thought to be generally a reference to blond hair. In 2007, 24,904 people had this name in Netherlands alone, making it the 21st most common name in that country. Variant forms are De With (pronounced the same), De Witt, De Witte and, especially in North America, DeWitt. People with the name include:

- Bernard de Wit (born 1945), Dutch theoretical physicist
- Caitlin De Wit (born 1987), Australian wheelchair basketball player
- Dani de Wit (born 1998), Dutch footballer
- Emmie de Wit, Dutch-American virologist
- Frank de Wit (born 1996), Dutch judoka
- Frederik de Wit (1630–1706), Dutch engraver, cartographer, and publisher
- Han F. de Wit (born 1944), Dutch psychologist
- Hans de Wit (born 1950), Dutch educator
- Hendrik de Wit (1909–1999), Dutch botanist
- Jacob de Wit (1695–1754), Dutch painter
- Jan de Wit (born 1945), Dutch lawyer and politician
- Johan de Wit, redirect to Johan de Witt (1625–1672), Dutch grand pensionary
- Johan de Wit (poet) (born 1944), Dutch-born British poet
- John de Wit (born 1947), English Anglican Archdeacon
- Karina de Wit (born 1976), Dutch badminton player
- Kees de Wit (1924–1993), Dutch soil scientist and plant breeder
- Lara de Wit (born 1983), Australian pianist, violinist, and composer
- Maarten de Wit (1883–1955), Dutch Olympic sailor, son of Simon de Wit
- Mees de Wit (born 1998), Dutch footballer
- Michaël Dudok de Wit (born 1953), Dutch animator, film director, and illustrator
- Paul de Wit (1852–1925), Dutch editor and collector of musical instruments
- Peter de Wit (born 1958), Dutch comics artist and cartoonist
- Pierre de Wit (born 1987), German footballer
- Piet de Wit (born 1946), Dutch cyclist
- Rob de Wit (athlete) (born 1962), Dutch decathlete and bobsledder
- Rob de Wit (footballer) (born 1963), Dutch footballer
- Robert de Wit (born 1962), Dutch Olympic decathlete
- Roel de Wit (1927–2012), Dutch politician and conservationist
- Safira de Wit (born c. 1989), Curaçao model
- Santiago de Wit Guzmán (born 1964), Spanish bishop and diplomat
- Sem de Wit (born 1995), Dutch footballer
- Simon de Wit (1852–1934), Dutch founder of eponymous supermarket chain
- Simon de Wit (rower) (1912–1976), Dutch businessman and rower, son of Maarten
- Sophie De Wit (born 1973), Belgian politician
- Stephan de Wit (born 1992), South African rugby player
- Tineke Duyvené de Wit (born 1946), Dutch novelist
- Yannick de Wit (born 1986), Dutch footballer

deWit, DeWit, Dewit

- Jacqueline deWit (1912–1998), American film and TV character actress
- Jeff DeWit (born 1972/1973), American businessman and Arizona politician
- Mark Dewit (born 1986), Canadian football player
- Willie deWit (born 1961), Canadian lawyer and former boxer

de With

- Gerard Frederikszoon de With (fl. 1625), Dutch governor of Formosa
- Witte Corneliszoon de With (1599–1658), Dutch admiral

== See also ==
- DeWitt (name)
- De Witt (surname)
- DeWitt (disambiguation)
