= Thug Notes =

American educational web series

- Genre: Educational, Comedy
- Created by: Jared Bauer
- Written by: Jared Bauer, Joseph Salvaggio
- Presented by: Greg Edwards
- Country of origin: United States
- Original language: English

Production
- Producer: Jacob Salamon
- Running time: 3-6 minutes
- Production company: Wisecrack

Original release
- Network: YouTube
- Release: June 3, 2013 – November 28, 2017

Thug Notes is an American educational web series that summarizes and analyzes various literary works in a comedic manner. Thug Notes first aired on June 3, 2013, on YouTube, with the pilot episode centered on Crime and Punishment. The host of the series is Sparky Sweets, Ph.D., portrayed by actor and comedian Greg Edwards. In 2015, a book of essays based on episodes from the series entitled Thug Notes: A Street-Smart Guide to Classic Literature was published by Vintage Books.

== Style ==
The series is presented by Greg Edwards in character as Sparky Sweets, Ph.D; the character hosts the series in an "original gangster" style.

The following is an example of Sweets' style from his analysis of To Kill a Mockingbird, one of his most popular: "Only a jive-ass fool would bother capping a mockingbird, 'cause all them bitches do is just drop next-level beats for your enjoyment. So what my girl Harper trying to say is ratting on Boo Radley wouldn't do no good. It would only rid the hood of one more true-blue player."

Explaining the usage of African-American Vernacular English within the series, Edwards stated, "but the truth is, the gift of literature is universal in meaning and should be made accessible to everyone on every plane. So, Thug Notes is my way of trivializing academia's attempt at making literature exclusionary by showing that even high-brow academic concepts can be communicated in a clear and open fashion." The style used by Edwards' character was a result of "frustration with the world of academia".

== Episodes ==
#	Book	Author	Note
1	Crime and Punishment	Fyodor Dostoevsky	
2	The Great Gatsby	F. Scott Fitzgerald	
3	To Kill a Mockingbird	Harper Lee	
4	Nineteen Eighty-Four	George Orwell	
5	Pride and Prejudice	Jane Austen	
6	Lord of the Flies	William Golding	
7	Great Expectations	Charles Dickens	
8	The Catcher in the Rye	J. D. Salinger	
9	Jane Eyre	Charlotte Brontë	
10	Hamlet	William Shakespeare	
11	The Hobbit	J. R. R. Tolkien	
12	Of Mice and Men	John Steinbeck	
13	Fahrenheit 451	Ray Bradbury	
14	Brave New World	Aldous Huxley	
15	Beowulf	Unknown	
16	Animal Farm	George Orwell	
17	Moby-Dick	Herman Melville	
18	Odyssey	Homer	
19	The Scarlet Letter	Nathaniel Hawthorne	
20	Frankenstein	Mary Shelley	Halloween Special
21	Heart of Darkness	Joseph Conrad	
22	Macbeth	William Shakespeare	
23	The Crucible	Arthur Miller	
24	Inferno	Dante Alighieri	
25	The Sun Also Rises	Ernest Hemingway	
26	Invisible Man	Ralph Ellison	
27	Notes from Underground	Fyodor Dostoevsky	
28	Romeo and Juliet	William Shakespeare	
29	Wuthering Heights	Emily Brontë	
30	The Picture of Dorian Gray	Oscar Wilde	
31	Lolita	Vladimir Nabokov	
32	All Quiet on the Western Front	Erich Maria Remarque	
33	Oedipus the King	Sophocles	Valentine's Day Special
34	A Separate Peace	John Knowles	
35	Slaughterhouse-Five	Kurt Vonnegut	
36	Things Fall Apart	Chinua Achebe	
37	Grendel	John Gardner	
38	Catch-22	Joseph Heller	
39	Ethan Frome	Edith Wharton	
40	Adventures of Huckleberry Finn	Mark Twain	
41	The Sound and the Fury	William Faulkner	
42	A Portrait of the Artist as a Young Man	James Joyce	
43	The Stranger	Albert Camus	
44	The Old Man and the Sea	Ernest Hemingway	
45	The Count of Monte Cristo	Alexandre Dumas	
46	The Grapes of Wrath	John Steinbeck	
47	The Brothers Karamazov	Fyodor Dostoevsky	
48	The Grand Inquisitor	Fyodor Dostoevsky	
49	Dune	Frank Herbert	
50	At the Mountains of Madness	H. P. Lovecraft	
51	The Giver	Lois Lowry	
52	The Hunger Games	Suzanne Collins	
53	The Metamorphosis	Franz Kafka	
54	One Hundred Years of Solitude	Gabriel García Márquez	
55	Dracula	Bram Stoker	Halloween Special
56	Julius Caesar	William Shakespeare	
57	A Clockwork Orange	Anthony Burgess	
58	Death of a Salesman	Arthur Miller	
59	Othello	William Shakespeare	
60	A Christmas Carol	Charles Dickens	Christmas Special
61	The Raven	Edgar Allan Poe	
62	A Tale of Two Cities	Charles Dickens	
63	A Raisin in the Sun	Lorraine Hansberry	Black History Month Special
64	Beloved	Toni Morrison	Black History Month Special
65	The Color Purple	Alice Walker	Black History Month Special
66	The Tell-Tale Heart	Edgar Allan Poe	
67	Fifty Shades of Grey	E. L. James	BET Short Episode
68	Alice's Adventures in Wonderland	Lewis Carroll	
69	Siddhartha	Hermann Hesse	
70	The Handmaid's Tale	Margaret Atwood	
71	Gone Girl	Gillian Flynn	
72	The Cat in the Hat	Dr. Seuss	Mother's Day Special
73	Watchmen	Alan Moore	
74	King Lear	William Shakespeare	
75	A Game of Thrones	George R. R. Martin	Part 1 of the A Song of Ice and Fire series
76	A Midsummer Night's Dream	William Shakespeare	
77	The Goldfinch	Donna Tartt	
78	The Outsiders	S.E. Hinton	
79	Go Set a Watchman	Harper Lee	
80	Doctor Faustus	Christopher Marlowe	
81	Ender's Game	Orson Scott Card	
82	The Fellowship of the Ring	J. R. R. Tolkien	Part 1 of the Lord of the Rings Trilogy
83	V for Vendetta	Alan Moore	
84	Don Quixote	Miguel de Cervantes	
85	The Lion, the Witch and the Wardrobe	C. S. Lewis	
86	No Country for Old Men	Cormac McCarthy	
87	Les Misérables	Victor Hugo	
88	The Hitchhiker's Guide to the Galaxy	Douglas Adams	
89	Life of Pi	Yann Martel	
90	Where the Red Fern Grows	Wilson Rawls	
91	The Fountainhead	Ayn Rand	
92	American Psycho	Bret Easton Ellis	
93	The Cask of Amontillado	Edgar Allan Poe	
94	Fight Club	Chuck Palahniuk	
95	A Wrinkle in Time	Madeleine L'Engle	
96	The Fall of the House of Usher	Edgar Allan Poe	
97	The Epic of Gilgamesh	Sîn-lēqi-unninni	
98	Madame Bovary	Gustave Flaubert	
99	The Trial	Franz Kafka	
100	The Merchant of Venice	William Shakespeare	
101	One Flew Over the Cuckoo's Nest	Ken Kesey	
102	Where the Wild Things Are	Maurice Sendak	
103	Horton Hears a Who!	Theodor Seuss Geisel	
104	Strange Case of Dr Jekyll and Mr Hyde	Robert Louis Stevenson	
105	Ready Player One	Ernest Cline	
106	No Country for Old Men; The Great Gatsby; The Hobbit	Cormac McCarthy; F. Scott Fitzgerald; J. R. R. Tolkien	This episode promoted the new podcast Thug Notes: Get Lit
107	It	Stephen King	
108	Emma	Jane Austen	

== Reception ==
Thug Notes has been met with a cumulative view total of over 160 million (as of June 2017) and critical acclaim. Thug Notes' popularity has been documented by mainstream news publications such as The New York Times and HuffPost. The Tampa Bay Times has noted that the series can be used as an educational tool.

In 2014, Wisecrack/Thug Notes was listed on NewMediaRockstars Top 100 Channels, ranked at #94.
