= Daniel Casper von Lohenstein =

17th-century German writer

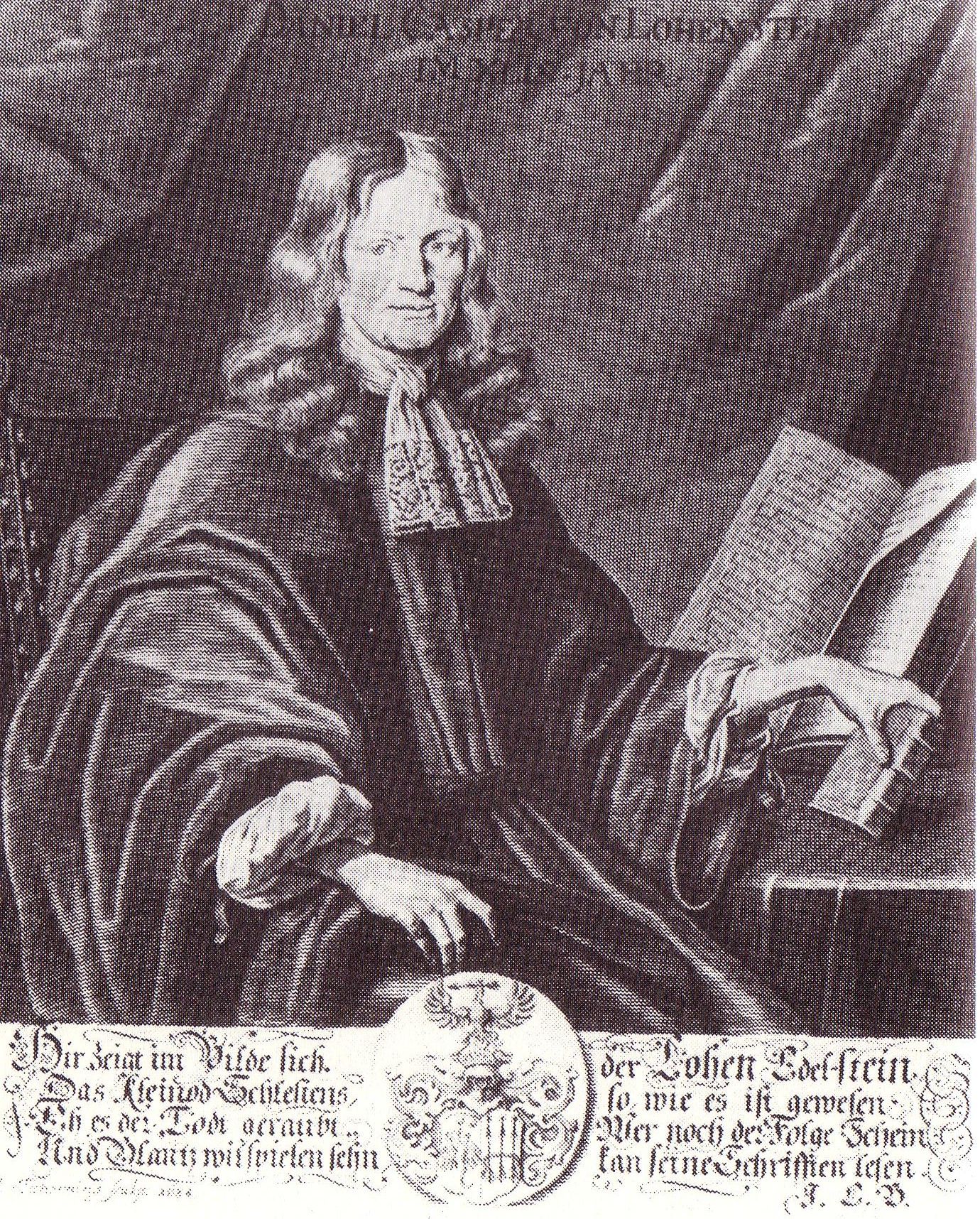
Daniel Casper von Lohenstein im XLIX. Jahr

Daniel Casper (25 January 1635 in Nimptsch, Niederschlesien – 28 April 1683 in Breslau, Niederschlesien), also spelled Daniel Caspar, and referred to from 1670 as Daniel Casper von Lohenstein, was a Baroque Silesian playwright, lawyer, diplomat, poet, and chief representative of the Second Silesian School.

== Family ==
The Casper and/or Caspar (Latin: Caspari) family came from the Brieg principality, first well known as poet and diplomats.

Daniel Casper was the son of the imperial customs-officer, Akzisefälle-Einnehmers and Biergefälle-Einnehmers named Johann (Hans) Casper (c.1600-after 1670), alderman and city constable of Nimptsch, and Susanna Schedel of Greiffenstein (1612–1652). His father Hans in 1642 received a Wappenbrief and was raised on 17 July 1670 to a hereditary imperial peerage, with the name of "von Lohenstein".

== Life ==
=== Youth ===
Daniel Casper was born 1635 in the princely Schloss Nimptsch, to which his parents had withdrawn during the Thirty Years' War. After initial private instruction in Nimptsch, his father sent him to Breslau where Caspar from 1642 to 1651 attended the Magdalenen-School, that had been upgraded in 1643 into a secondary school (Maria-Magdalenen-Gymnasium). In the midpoint of his philological and rhetorical education there, he already as eleven-year-old student carried out disputations with antique examples over what qualified one to be a peer. At 15 he composed his first tragedy, "Ibrahim". Lohenstein was friendly with Heinrich Mühlpfort.

After finishing secondary school, Casper had to leave Breslau because there was as yet no university in the town. At the University of Leipzig he studied under Benedikt Carpzov (1595–1666), the founder of the German criminal justice system, and at the University of Tübingen with Wolfgang Adam Lauterbach (1618–1678), where on 6 June 1655 he produced his Disputation ("Disputation Jurudica de Voluntate").

After finishing his studies, the (at that time usual) Grand Tour which he joined led him first of all to the sovereign courts of Germany, then to Switzerland, Leiden, Utrecht and Vienna (but not Italy, due to the plague then raging there). With Italy ruled out, he spent some time in Hungary, coming into contact with the Turkish-Oriental cultural circles there.

Recalled by his father, he came home by ship, through a strong thunderstorm he remembered his whole life, in which he saw the sinking of 13 ships. After his homecoming, he established himself as a lawyer in Breslau and on 30 October 1657, at 22, in Breslau, he married Elisabeth Herrmann (died 1708 in Zettritz, Landkreis Landsberg (Warthe) ), Mark Brandenburg), the daughter of Caspar Herrmann, Amtmann for Breslau's state property (Landgüter des Rats).

=== Patronage ===
He had in 1665 produced his second poetic work, the tragedy "Aggrippina", dedicated to duchess Louise von Liegnitz-Brieg-Wohlau (born princess of Anhalt-Dessau). Louise's queen-regent Elisabeth Marie in 1668 founded a Regierungsrat at Oels. Caspar was, as a scholar, advising Louise and also helped in the design and construction of the Piasten-Gruft (tomb) in Liegnitz. Duke Christian strove to attract him to his court as a secret advisor, but Caspar declined before returning 1670 to Breslau, where a successful and promising career beckoned.

Already as student, he had moved among the patrician circles of the Breslau city-state and beyond. Now the eldest advisor there, Christian Hoffmann von Hoffmannswaldau (1616–1679) advocated Caspar as a poet and other works of his - like his famous funeral oration of 1679 addressed to Christian - were very admired. He came, on the abdication of the Obersyndikus Peter Muck von Muckendorff 1670, to receive the presidency of the Herzogtums Lauenburg, with the second Syndikus, Andreas von Assig, taking his place as Obersyndikus. Thus Caspar von Lohenstein became a Syndikus at Assig.

=== Syndic and diplomat in Breslau ===
Thus he arrived in one of the most important offices of the city. The elevation of his family into the peerage a few weeks later might have been meant more for him than for his father. In the year 1675, Assig had to abandon his office due to illness and Caspar took his place as Obersyndikus, holding that office for the eight years until his death.

The governing of Schlesien after the Thirty Years' War was strongly marked by anti-reforming efforts. When an imperial edict commanded the dismissal of all Protestant schoolteachers, the danger of an occupation of Breslau by imperial troops under the leadership of the general Kop was so great that Caspar was dispatched to Vienna for negotiations. With the diplomatic skill of an educated man, he succeeded, moving the emperor so much that he gave up his demand. The city took advantage of his high diplomatic capabilities even more often, sending him as an ambassador, though he still achieved much as a lawyer as well as proving himself as a diplomat and politician.

Daniel Casper von Lohenstein was the owner of several towns. He acquired in 1673 the Kittelau from duchess (Herzogin) Louise von Brieg and in the same year inherited Reisau and Roschkowitz from Tobias von Kleindienst. As an acknowledged poet, an ennobled Obersyndikus and landowner, Caspar was at his peak of life in the 1670s. Turning always more strongly towards the Habsburg position, he was appointed an imperial advisor in 1675. He died at the family Schloss at Breslau, Niederschlesien, of a stroke in 1683.

== Works ==
Casper's production as a poet, especially when considered together with his contemporaneous work as lawyer and diplomat, is astonishing. Extremely productive, he was above all known as an author of theatrical pieces marked by the well known French Classicism in drama and as - next to Andreas Gryphius - one of the most important dramatists of the baroque. In addition to this he was known as a poet and as a translator.

His novel "Großmütiger Feldherr Arminius", comprising around 3000 pages, appeared between 1689 and 1690 and was a highpoint of baroque romantic art, despite concerns over the often obscure and overwrought language. In it he put up for discussion the situation of the German empire after the Thirty Years' War and tries to take stock of contemporary knowledge.

His lyric poetry was published in periodic periodicals. He used exaggeration and overdramatisation in his works to work out the contrast to the "better" reality, and they thus stand in the tradition of Senecan tragedy.

Daniel Caspar von Lohenstein in many of his writings showed his views on statesmanship and the art of ruling, similar to "Christian Hoffmann von Hoffmannswaldau" views.

=== List of works ===
- „Ibrahim, 1649/50 (first printed after his death in 1685)
- Cypress-Tafel, (tragic poem or lyric), 1652
- Denk- und Dankaltar, 1652
- Ibrahim, Trauerspiel (Tragedy), 1653
- Rechtsstreit der Schönheit und Freundlichkeit, 1657
- Trauer- und Trostgedanken, 1658
- Schuldiges Ehren-Gedächtnis, 1660
- Cleopatra, Drama, 1661
- Redender Totenkopf, 1662
- Erlangte Ewigkeit, 1664
- Agrippina, Trauerspiel, 1665
- Epicharis, Trauerspiel, 1665
- Ibrahim Sultan, Schauspiel (tragedy that ends happily), 1673
- Blumen, poem, 1680
- Geistliche Gedanken, poem, 1680
- Trauer- und Lustgedichte, 1680
- Sophonisbe, Drama, 1680
- Großmütiger Feldherr Arminius, Roman (novel), 1689–90
