= Goose Creek Energy Center =

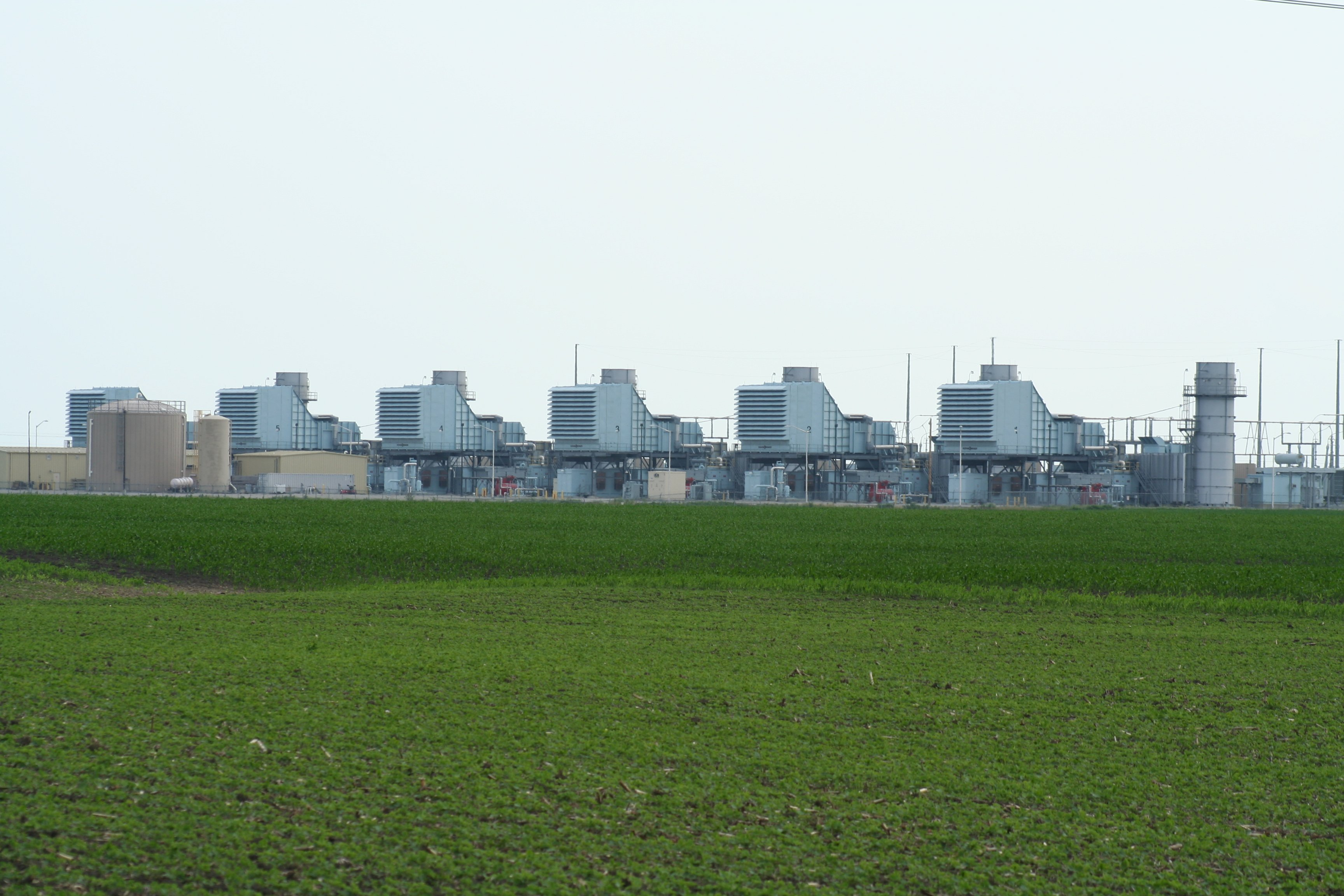
- Country: United States
- Location: Goose Creek township, Piatt County, Illinois
- Coordinates: 40°6′25″N 88°35′57″W
- Status: Operational
- Commission date: November 2002, purchased by Ameren in 2006
- Owner: AmerenUE

Thermal power station
- Primary fuel: Natural gas or fuel oil
- Turbine technology: Gas turbine

Power generation
- Units operational: 6
- Nameplate capacity: 684 megawatts

Goose Creek Energy Center is a 684 megawatt natural gas fired power station located in Goose Creek township, Piatt County, Illinois between Lodge, Illinois and De Land, Illinois. Previously owned by Aquila Piatt County Power, purchased by AmerenUE in 2006.
