= Paweł Sibik =

Polish footballer

Personal information
- Date of birth: 15 February 1971 (age 55)
- Place of birth: Niemcza, Poland
- Height: 1.80 m (5 ft 11 in)
- Position: Midfielder

Senior career*
| Years | Team | Apps | (Gls) |
| 1988–1989 | Argona Niemcza | | |
| 1989–1995 | Lechia Dzierżoniów | 147 | (23) |
| 1995–2002 | Odra Wodzisław Śląski | 184 | (28) |
| 2003 | Apollon Limassol | 22 | (2) |
| 2004 | Odra Wodzisław Śląski | 8 | (0) |
| 2004 | Podbeskidzie Bielsko-Biała | 12 | (0) |
| 2005 | Ruch Chorzów | 16 | (0) |
| 2005 | Apollon Limassol | 3 | (0) |
| 2006 | Przyszłość Rogów | | |
| 2015 | GKS Krupiński Suszec | | |
| 2016–2019 | Victoria Tuszyn | | |

International career
| 2002 | Poland | 3 | (0) |

Managerial career
- 2008: Odra Wodzisław Śląski
- 2008–2009: Przyszłość Rogów
- 2009: Odra Wodzisław Śląski (caretaker)
- 2009–2010: LKS Krzyżanowice
- 2011: Odra Wodzisław Śląski (caretaker)
- 2011–2015: GKS Krupiński Suszec
- 2019–2024: Lechia Dzierżoniów
- * Club domestic league appearances and goals

Paweł Sibik (born 15 February 1971) is a Polish professional football manager and former player who played as a midfielder. He was most recently in charge of Lechia Dzierżoniów.

He played for clubs such as Odra Wodzisław, Ruch Chorzów, Cypriot club Apollon Limassol and Podbeskidzie Bielsko-Biała. Sibik earned three caps for the Poland national team during 2002, including an appearance at the 2002 FIFA World Cup in a group stage match against the USA.

== Career statistics ==
=== International ===
Appearances and goals by national team and year
| National team | Year | Apps | Goals |
|---|---|---|---|
Poland
| Poland | 2002 | 3 | 0 |
| Total | | 3 | 0 |

== Honours ==
=== Player ===
Apollon Limassol

- Cypriot First Division: 2005–06

=== Managerial ===
Przyszłość Rogów

- Polish Cup (Racibórz regionals): 2008–09

GKS Krupiński Suszec

- Regional league Katowice I: 2012–13

Lechia Dzierżoniów

- IV liga Lower Silesia East: 2021–22
- Polish Cup (Lower Silesia regionals): 2021–22
- Polish Cup (Wałbrzych regionals): 2021–22
