= Wittig =

Wittig is a surname, and may refer to:

- Burghardt Wittig (born 1947), German biochemist
- Claudia Wittig (born 1983), German historian and politician
- Curt Wittig, American chemist
- David Wittig (born 1955), American executive
- Edward Wittig (1879–1941), Polish sculptor
- Ferdinand Wittig (1851–1909), American politician
- Georg Wittig (1897–1987), German chemist
- Iris Wittig (1928–1978), German military pilot
- Johnnie Wittig (1914–1999), American baseball player
- Martin C. Wittig (born 1964), German CEO
- Michael Wittig (born 1976), American musician
- Monique Wittig (1935–2003), French author and feminist theorist
- Peter Wittig (born 1954), German diplomat
- Reinhold Wittig (1937–2026), German board game designer and geologist
- Rüdiger Wittig (born 1946), German professor of geobotany and ecology
- Sigmar Wittig (born 1940), German Chair of the European Space Agency
- Susan Wittig Albert (born 1940), American mystery writer
- Werner Wittig (cyclist) (1909–1992), German cyclist
- Werner Wittig (painter) (1930–2013), German painter, engraver and printmaker
- Werner Wittig (politician) (1926–1976), East German politician

== See also ==
- Wittich
- Wittig River
- 1,2-Wittig rearrangement
- 2,3-Wittig rearrangement
- Wittig reaction
- Wittig reagents
- Witting
