= Witting =

Witting is a popular Germanic surname.

== Etymology ==
"Witting" is thought to be a patronymic surname, derive the Old English personal name Hwit, meaning "the white one".

== Notable people ==
- Alexander Witting (1861–1946), German mathematician
- Amy Witting (1918–2001), Australian novelist and poet
- Richard Witting (1856–1923), Prussian politician and financier
- Rolf Witting (1879–1944), Minister of Foreign Affairs (Finland) 1940–1943

== See also ==
- Wittig
