= Police impersonation =

Impersonation of a law enforcement officer

Police impersonation is the act of falsely portraying oneself as a member of the police for the purpose of deception.

== Typology and methods ==
Criminology research has developed a typology of police impersonators, categorizing offenders as (1) "police enthusiasts" (or "wannabe cops"); (2) compulsive deviants; and (3) common criminals seeking material gain through thefts and robberies committed through vehicle pull-overs and home invasions.

A 2012 article in the American Journal of Criminal Justice noted that "Distinguishing between real and phony officers can be difficult, and impersonators present themselves in numerous manners and commit a wide variety of crimes. Impersonators do more than just pretend to be a law enforcement officer. At times, impersonators engage in serious and wide ranging crimes including robbery, rape, and homicide." The same study found that "in general, police impersonators, depending on the type of offense, may be easily deterred. In vehicle pull-over cases, most impersonators fled when the targeted victim was on the phone with 911 verifying the legitimacy of the stop. Additionally, potential victims who questioned the legitimacy of the stop and challenged the fake officer tended to avoid further victimization."

The 2012 study examined 56 police impersonation episodes from May 2002 to February 2010 from three U.S. metropolitan areas, dealing with 63 offenders and 71 victims. The study found that these incidents "most often involve one victim (76%), one offender (91%), no witnesses (75%), no weapon (68%), and result in no injury to the victim (96%)." The mean value of cash and property lost was $616. Of police impersonation episodes, 45% occurred on a highway, roadway, or alley; 20% occurred in or near the victim's home (such as a fake "knock and talk"); and 34% occurred in some other place. The study found that only 46% of police impersonation incidents were "cleared" (i.e., arrest made or resolved in some other way).

Police impersonation has also facilitated extortion and assault. Police "wannabees" may drive cars equipped with police-style emergency lights, wear police uniforms, and carry fake police badges. There is a limited body of research concerning police impersonation. Some scholars suggest that police impersonation may weaken public confidence in law enforcement and trust in authority, "particularly if victims believe that the event was a 'legitimate' police action undertaken by a corrupt cop." Some sexual predators have impersonated police to commit sexual abuse, harassment, and rape. Impersonation involving police vehicle and uniforms has also been used by Mexican drug cartels to smuggle currency across the U.S.–Mexico border; within Mexico, Gulf Cartel operatives have also posed as members of the Mexican police and military.

== History ==
Police impersonation has a long history. In 17th and 18th-century London, impostors presented to be constables, Marshalsea, or sheriffs' officers to extort bribes or commit sex crimes. Between 1685 and 1701, 29 men in London were caught assuming the identities of law officers. In 18th-century Qing China, the police, officials, and yamen runners were often vulnerable to impersonation. There were almost 150 surviving recorded cases in the Third Reich of impersonations of its police, mostly of the notorious Gestapo secret police. A study by Robert Gellately concluded that: "As the Gestapo and to some considerable extent also the Kripo attained a reputation for ruthlessness, brutality and mystery, their powers and reputation not only deterred, but called forth amateur imitators. From the point-of-view of impostors, the Gestapo (and Kripo) had the additional advantage of being detectives operating mostly in civilian clothes."

In Nigeria, impersonation of Nigeria Police Force officers remains a problem, inhibiting public confidence in police.

In 2011, Anders Behring Breivik carried out a bombing in Oslo and a mass shooting in Utøya, all while dressed in a police uniform and presenting himself as an Oslo Police Department officer.

During a two-day spree shooting in Nova Scotia in April 2020, the perpetrator, who killed 22 people, posed as a Royal Canadian Mounted Police officer and a drove a replica RCMP cruiser.

== Criminal laws ==
=== United Kingdom ===
Police impersonation "with intent to deceive" is criminalised by Section 90 of the Police Act 1996. The same section also restricts the sale of police uniforms and paraphernalia, although illicit trade in items such as warrant cards continues in the UK.

=== Ireland ===
Under Section 60 of the Garda Síochána Act 2005, it is an offence to impersonate a member of the Garda Síochána. It is also an offence under Section 61 to possess and/or wear any article of Garda uniform, or possess or use any article, equipment or vehicle with Garda markings that could deceive. Punishment for both offences, upon conviction on indictment, is a fine of up to €50,000, or imprisonment for up to five years, or both. An exception to Section 61 may be made for an artistic performance or with the permission of the Garda Commissioner.

== See also ==
- Impersonating a public servant
- Impersonations of United States immigration officials
- Military impostor
- Jeremy Dewitte
