= Wisecrack (disambiguation) =

Wisecrack is a form of wit.

Wisecrack may also refer to:

- Wisecrack (album), by Haley Blais
- Wisecrack (company), an American film and production company
- Wisecrack, a character in the Malibu Comics series Protectors

== See also ==
- Wisecracks, a 1991 film
