= Wyt =

Wyt, or WYT, may refer to:

- The Play of Wyt and Science, a mid-sixteenth-century English morality play written by John Redford
- Wyt, an archaic spelling of wit, a form of intelligent humour
- WYT, the National Rail code for Wythall railway station in Worcestershire, UK

== See also ==
- Wit (disambiguation)
