= Witke =

Witke is a German surname originating in the Slavic given name Witek. Notable persons with the surname include:

- Dominik Witke-Jeżewski (1862, Skrwilno – 1944, Jasieniec), a Polish landowner, art collector, patron of artists and cultural institutions
- Robert Witke Polish ski jumper
- Roxane Witke
- Ryszard Witke (1939–2020, Sanok), a Polish ski jumper
- Kurt Witke (born 1948), a German football referee

== See also ==
- Wittke
