= Wittich =

Wittich is a surname. Notable people with the surname include:

- Paul Wittich (c.1546 – 1586), Silesia-born astronomer
- Christopher Wittich (Latin: Christophorus Wittichius; 1625–1687), Silesia-born Dutch theologian
- Ludwig von Wittich (1818–1884), Prussian lieutenant general
- Marie Wittich (1868–1931), German operatic soprano
- Paul Wittich (politician) (1877–1957), German social democratic politician in Slovakia
- Art Wittich (born 1957), American politician
- Ines Wittich (born 1969), German shot putter
- Patrick Wittich (born 1982), German football player

== See also ==
- Wittig
