= Witte =

Witte (and de Witte) are Dutch and Low German surnames meaning "(the) white one". Witte can also be a patronymic surname. Notable people with the surname include:

- Alfred Witte (1878–1941), German astrologer
- Barbara Witte (1922–1992), German politician
- Carla Witte (1889–1943), German-Uruguayan painter, sculptor and teacher
- Dave Witte, American drummer
- Earl Witte (1906–1991), American football player
- Edwin E. Witte (1887–1960), American economist, "father of social security"
- Els Witte (born 1941), Belgian historian
- Erich Witte (1911–2008), German stage actor, operatic tenor and opera director
- George Witte (21st-century), American poet
- Helmut Witte (1915–2005), German U-boat commander
- Herman Witte (1909–1973), Dutch engineer and politician
- Jean Carlo Witte (born 1977), Brazilian football (soccer) player
- Jerry Witte (1915–2002), American baseball player
- Joe Witte (born 1943), American weatherman
- John Witte (1933–1993), American football player
- John Witte, Jr. (born 1959), Canadian-American legal scholar
- Karl Witte (1800–1883), German jurist and Dante Alighieri scholar
- Keiser Witte (born 1995), American weightlifter
- Laura Witte (1869–1939), American-born suffragette active in Germany
- Les Witte (1911–1973), American college basketball player
- Luke Witte (born 1950), American basketball player
- Michael Witte (born 1944), American-born illustrator and cartoonist
- Otto Witte (1872–1958), German circus acrobat
- Philip Witte (born 1984), German field hockey player
- Russ Witte (1916–2016), American swimmer
- Sergei Witte (1849–1915), Russian policy-maker
- Terry L. Witte (born 1952), American attorney and politician
- William Witte FRSE (1907–1992), Slovak-British scholar of German language and literature
- William Henry Witte (1817–1876), American politician

== As a given name ==
- Witte van Haemstede (c. 1281 – 1321), Dutch nobility, son of Floris V, Count of Holland
- Witte de With (1599–1658), Dutch naval officer

== Other ==
- Witte Museum
- Witte Automotive

== See also ==
- Witt (disambiguation)
