= Hans de Witte =

Hans de Witte (1583–1630) was a German financier who was the main financial backer of Albrecht von Wallenstein's army during the Thirty Years War. After Wallenstein was dismissed by Ferdinand II, de Witte committed suicide. Wallenstein was dismissed on 26 August 1630, De Witte committed suicide on 28 August 1630 and couldn't possibly have heard the news. De Witte had become very wealthy in partnership with Wallenstein. Unable to service loans his credit rating dropped and other financiers avoided him . Wallenstein replied to his pleas by demanding immediately 20,000 gulden for the monthly upkeep of his court. De Witte threw himself down his well. On receiving the news Wallenstein sent a team to salvage any assets.

== Sources ==
- John G. Gagliardo. Germany Under the Old Regime, 1600-1790. New York: Longman, 1991. p. 78.
- Fritz Redlich. "Military Entrepreneurship and the Credit System in the 16th Century". in Kykols: International Review of Social Sciences. Vol. 10, issue 2, p. 186-193. May 1957.
