= Wisecrack (company) =

American film and video production company

Wisecrack, Inc.
- Type: Private company (INC)
- Industry: Web series
- Founded: 2014; 12 years ago
- Defunct: April 16, 2025; 17 months ago
- Headquarters: Los Angeles, United States
- Area served: Worldwide
- Key people: Jacob Salamon (CEO), Drew Levin (Channel Manager), Todd Mendeloff (Chief Operating Officer)
- Products: Comedy; Film analysis Web series
- Website: Wisecrack.com

Wisecrack, Inc. was an American production company operated by Jacob Salamon, Jared Bauer, Greg Edwards, Drew Levin, and Todd Mendeloff. The company was founded in 2014 and produced various web series and podcasts such as Thug Notes, Earthling Cinema, and 8-Bit Philosophy. The group focused on an analysis of anime, film, literature, and video games drawing out philosophy, sociology, psychology and other meanings that can be interpreted from media. Wisecrack was purchased by Blue Ant Media in August 2019. On April 16, 2025, Wisecrack announced that it was shutting down.

== Web series ==
- Earthling Cinema stars actor-comedian Mark Schroeder as Garyx Wormuloid, an extraterrestrial historian with huge eyebrows from the distant future wherein the human species has long since gone extinct, who examines common films as the last remnants of human civilization, while comedically demonstrating lack of certain knowledge that almost no one in that civilization would lack, but simultaneously having a depth of understanding that if only those poor sad humans had had, they might have been able to save themselves.
- Thug Notes stars actor-comedian Greg Edwards as Sparky Sweets, Ph.D., a stereotypical gangster who presents literary analysis of classic and popular literature such as The Great Gatsby, Dracula and Beloved.
- 8-bit Philosophy, produced and animated by MB X McClain, explores philosophical questions with narration by Nathan Lowe. Usually each episode is set in the style of a classic game from the 80s or 90s, and the series had some reoccurring gags. Music was provided by David Krystal. The series concluded in 2016.
- Boss Bitches of History, written and hosted by pornographic actors Ela Darling and Sovereign Syre, explores the lives of strong women throughout history such as Cleopatra and Marie-Joseph Angélique.
- Wisecrack Edition
- Pop Psych

== Podcasts ==
- The Squanch a Rick and Morty analysis podcast.
- Show Me the Meaning! a podcast that analyzes an eclectic mix of movies.
- The Maze a Westworld podcast.
- Respect Our Authoritah! a South Park podcast.
- Thug Notes: Get Lit! a podcast companion to the popular web series. While the web series covers individual literary works, each entry in this podcast covers a literary theme and not a specific literary work.
- Culture Binge a current pop culture discussion/analysis podcast.
