= Sigmar Wittig =

Chair of the European Space Agency

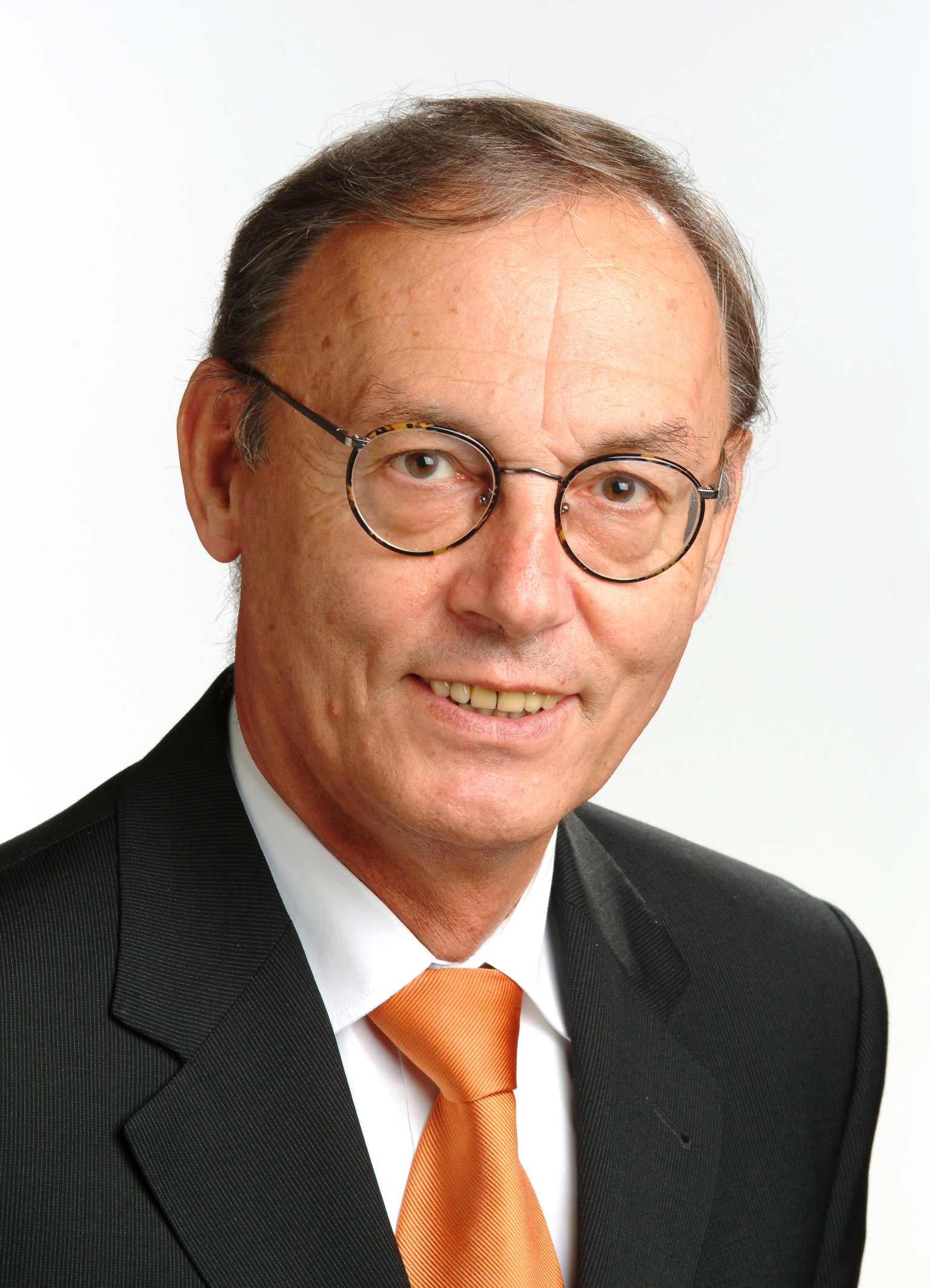
Sigmar Wittig

Dr. Sigmar Wittig (born 25 February 1940 in Nimptsch, former Silesia region of Germany) has been the chairman of the executive board of the German Aerospace Center (Deutsches Zentrum für Luft- und Raumfahrt) since March 2002. He was the chair of the European Space Agency Council for a two-year term between 1 July 2005 and 30 June 2007.

Professor Wittig was instrumental in starting an exchange program between Purdue University and the University of Karlsruhe called the Global Engineering Alliance for Research and Education (GEARE).

== Curriculum vitae ==
He studied mechanical engineering at the RWTH Aachen, finishing with a doctorate in 1967. This was followed by a nine-year spell in the U.S., as an associate professor at Purdue University.

In 1976, he went back to Germany to the University of Karlsruhe, to lead the Institute of Thermal Turbomachinery. From 1994 to 2002, he was president of the university.
