= Witt =

Witt or WITT may refer to:

== People ==
- Witt (surname), including a list of people with the name
- Lefty Guise (1908–1968), American baseball player born Witt Orison Guise

== Places ==
- Witt, Illinois, United States
- Witt, Kentucky
- Sultan Iskandar Muda International Airport (ICAO code WITT), in Banda Aceh, Indonesia
- Windsor International Transit Terminal

== Other uses ==
- 2732 Witt, an asteroid
- Museum Witt, the world's leading collection of moths in Munich, Germany
- Western Institute of Technology at Taranaki, a polytechnic in New Zealand
- WITT (FM), a radio station (91.9 FM) in Zionsville, Indiana, United States
- Witt (poetry collection), a 1973 book by Patti Smith
- Witt Weiden, a German mail order house

== See also ==
- Wit (disambiguation)
- Witte, a surname
- Witts, a surname
