= Pauline de Witt =

French historian

Pauline de Witt (née Guizot; 22 June 1831 in Paris – 28 February 1874 in Cannes) was a French historian and translator.

== Biography ==
She was the second daughter of François Guizot and the sister of Guillaume and Henriette Guizot.

She wrote Histoire de Guillaume le Conquérant ("History of William the Conqueror") and actively collaborated to her father's last work Histoire de France racontée à mes petits-enfants ("History of France told to my grand-children").

On May 18, 1850, she married historian and Calvados deputy Cornélis Henri de Witt, with whom she had seven children. Their two daughters Henriette and Pauline married the brothers Conrad and Cornélis Henri de Witt, who were also Protestants.

Pauline de Witte was buried at the cemetery of Saint-Ouen-le-Pin, Calvados.

== Works ==
- Guillaume le Conquérant, ou, L'Angleterre sous les Normands, London: Hachette; Philadelphia: J.B. Lippincott, 1878.
- Six mois de guerre, 1870-1871 : lettres et journal de Mme Cornélis de Witt, 1894.
- Histoire de deux petits frères, Paris: Hachette, 1890.
- Contes anglais, Paris, 1883.

Translation

- Elizabeth Prentiss, Les petits brins de fil ou fil embrouillé, fil-d'argent et fil-d’or, transl. from English by Pauline de Cornelis de Witt, 1865.

== Bibliography ==
- Marie-Nicolas Bouillet & Alexis Chassang (ed.) (1878). "Pauline de Witt". Dictionnaire universel d'histoire et de géographie (in French).
