= Jeremy Dewitte =

American police impersonator

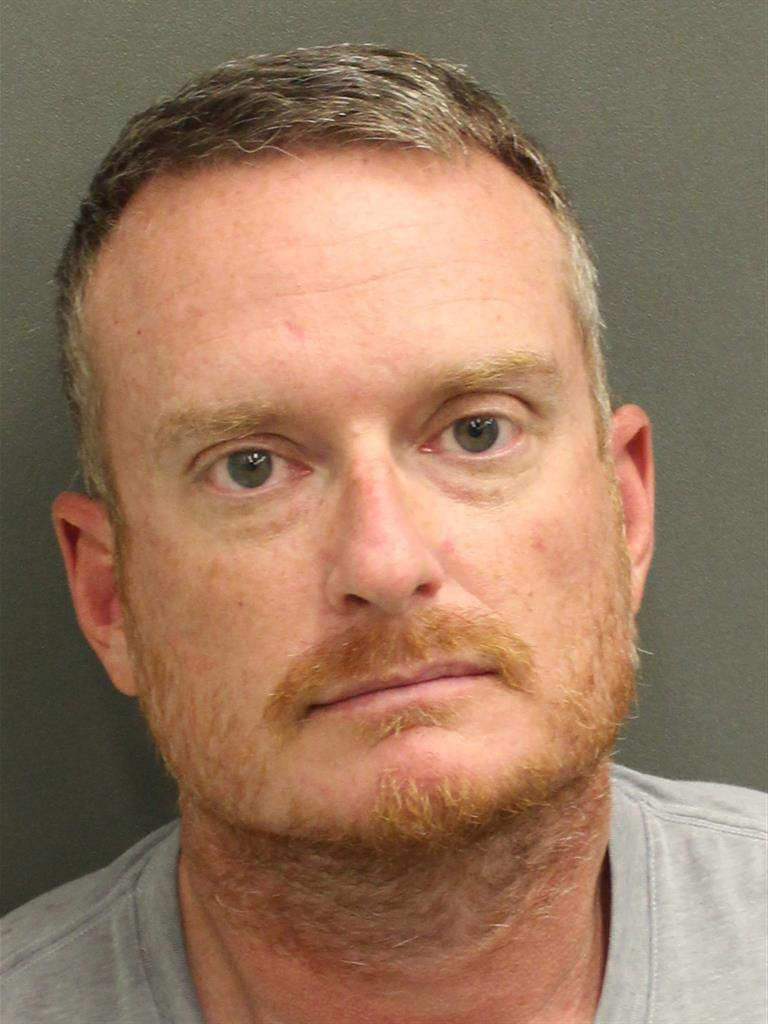
- Mugshot of Dewitte in 2022
- Born: Jeremy Charles Dewitte; February 10, 1980 (age 46); Florida, U.S.
- Organization: Metro State Vehicle Protection Services (owner-operator)
- Known for: Impersonating law enforcement / Child Crimes
- Television: Dr. Phil (2021)
- Criminal charges: Impersonating a police officer; and Failing to register as a sex offender; and Filing false tax returns

Details
- State: Florida

Jeremy Charles Dewitte (born February 10, 1980) is an American serial police impersonator and convicted sex offender. Dewitte has been jailed multiple times for repeatedly impersonating police officers, among other crimes, while working as a funeral procession escort.

== Career ==
Dewitte is from central Florida and was the owner-operator of Metro State Vehicle Protection Services which provided vehicle escorts to funeral processions.

Dewitte claimed to have served in the United States Army Special Forces, to have participated in the Second Battle of Fallujah, and to have had an early medical discharge due to injuries sustained in a parachute jump. In reality, Dewitte never served in any branch of the armed forces and was in prison during the time he claims to have served.

== Legal and media issues ==
Dewitte was charged in 2001 with impersonating a police officer, while a member of a police explorers’ program. A 2003 charge of impersonating a police officer resulted in an almost two year state prison sentence. In 2005 he was arrested for sexual battery of a victim between 12 and 15 years old, mandating him to register as a sex offender. In 2009, he was sentenced to an extra four years in prison for breaching parole stipulations, although he was released early in October 2011.

In 2018, Dewitte was criminally charged for failing to register as a sex offender.

In October 2019, he was arrested by the Orange County Sheriff's Office a second time for impersonating a police officer in Windermere, Florida. Dewitte was accused of "wearing a shirt with a police badge, a bullet-resistant vest and a helmet with a police-like badge while he worked a funeral procession."

In November 2019, he was arrested and accused of impersonating a police officer a third time.

In February 2021, he appeared on the television talk show Dr. Phil and denied impersonating police. The next month, he was arrested again for impersonating a police officer. Dewitte had an imitation pistol when arrested. In September 2021, he was sentenced to 18 months in prison, had his driving license suspended for six months, and was sentenced to four years of probation.

After being released from prison around August 2022, Dewitte was arrested on November 29, 2022, by Osceola County Sheriff's Office for violating his probation conditions. Dewitte informed news channel WFTV that the arrest stemmed from his not shutting down his YouTube channel, and that he had lost control of the channel, preventing him from taking the channel offline. In 2023 and 2024, Dewitte was arrested several times on insurance fraud charges and failure to report online accounts and vehicles as required of convicted sex offenders by Florida law.

On November 1, 2024 Dewitte was convicted and sentenced to nearly seven years in prison by a jury for failure to register a new motor vehicle as a past sexual offender.

On January 7, 2025 Dewitte was sentenced to 41 months in federal prison plus one year of supervised release and $70,000 in restitution for filing false tax returns related to his income from his business.

On September 17, 2025 Dewitte was sentenced to five and a half years in state prison followed by probation on insurance fraud charges.
