= Lodewijk De Witte =

Belgian politician

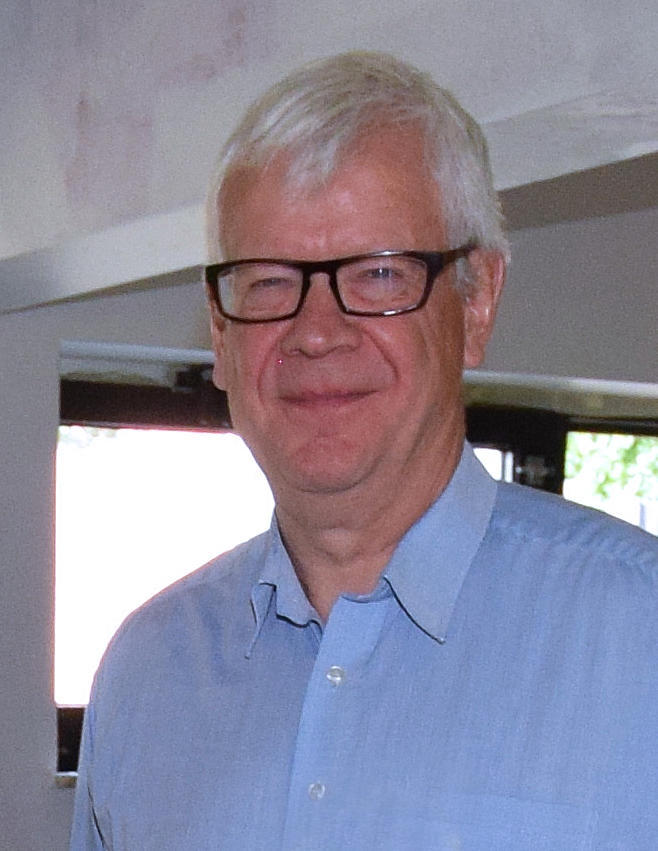

Lodewijk "Lode" De Witte (Dutch pronunciation: [ˈloːdə(ʋɛiɡ) də ˈʋɪtə]; born 12 December 1954 in Zwevegem) is the former governor of the Belgian province of Flemish Brabant.

After his studies at the law school of the Katholieke Universiteit Leuven, he remained active as a researcher and became specialised in issues concerning labour law (namely the formal position of foreign employees), which was assigned to him by the European Economic Community. Since 1981, he was involved with the Emile Vandervelde-Institute, where he became a public servant in 1988. Initially, as an attaché for the Ministry of Internal Affairs, after subsequently as advisor and adjunct-head of cabinet.

In 1994 he was appointed as the commissionary of government and was given the task to prepare the division of the unitary Belgian province of Brabant. He became the first governor of the newly made Flemish Brabant, which exists alongside the province of Walloon Brabant since 1 January 1995. He retired on the 28 of August 2020. Jan Spooren is his successor as governor.
