= Worldwide Industrial Telemetry Standards =

Set of communication protocols

Worldwide Industrial Telemetry Standards (WITS) is a suite of communications protocols designed for use within the public utility industry between components of a SCADA system. It was developed for communications between a WITS Master Station and its remotely connected WITS Field Devices (for example, Remote Telemetry Units).

WITS maintains two protocols, WITS-DNP3 and WITS-IoT.

- WITS-DNP3 is a DNP3 protocol based protocol primarily used for larger 'always-on' utility assets. WITS-DNP3 is very well suited to traditional SCADA Telemetry control operations. WITS-DNP3 is based on the DNP3 protocol level2+, and uses DNP3’s generic protocol extension mechanism to define and provide the additional functionality required by water industry users. WITS-DNP3 provides Secure Authentication between Master and Field Device and uses device vendor supplied Configuration Applications for limited plug and play functions.
- WITS-IoT is a JSON based application layer protocol designed for very large numbers of smaller devices which may be online only for brief periods. WITS-IoT is well suited to the monitoring and logging of large numbers of infrastructure assets using battery powered devices over a Wireless WAN. WITS-IoT provides for robust security using industry standard protocols, enjoys wide and easy availability of its protocol stack and adds full plug and play to WITS for the first time.

While initially developed by and for the Water Industry, the WITS protocols are generic SCADA Communications protocols.

The WITS functionality was originally defined in the mid 2000s by the UK water companies via a joint UK Water Industry / equipment vendors team. During 2011, ownership of the WITS protocol passed into the hands of the WITS Protocol Standards Association for future management and maintenance.

== Technical details ==
WITS-DNP3 adds functionality to the underlying DNP3 protocol :-

- Device Profiles
  - The characteristics and capabilities of a particular WITS-DNP3 Field Device are defined in a ‘Device Profile’, which is in XML format. This 'device profile' is read into the WITS-DNP3 Master Station and used to limit what a user can do to that particular Field Device.
- Device Configuration
  - WITS-DNP3 provides Master Stations with the ability to incrementally change the configuration of Field Devices. This is done using DNP3 file transfer to send incremental configuration updates to a Field Device. This mechanism provides flexibility for managing the configuration of remote Field Devices from a central location. Examples of configuration changes could be analog input scaling, definition of alarm limits and enabling / disabling inputs.
- Information exchange between a WITS-DNP3 Master Station and Field Device
  - WITS-DNP3 defines seven DNP3 'Data Sets' for Field Devices to report data to a Master Station and for a Master Station to control a Field Device. These are as follows :-
  - for reporting data - change of state or transgression of a limit
  - for monitoring the health of a device
  - for requesting a device to 'call in' and test a communications path
  - for controlling programs sent to a Field Device
  - for controlling whether inputs cause events to be sent to the Master Station
- Data Logging
  - WITS-DNP3 Field Devices can record local data log files. These contain data with a time stamp and retrieved later by a Master Station. The logs are retrieved by means of DNP3 file transfer.

WITS-IoT provides, as a minimum, the same base functionality as WITS-DNP3. WITS-IoT takes the WITS-DNP3 protocol definition and replaces DNP3 with JSON structures and a new communications life-cycle description.

== Accreditation ==
WITS-DNP3 devices are 'accredited' in one of two forms:

- WITS Self certified
  - Tests have been conducted by the vendor themselves using their own test equipment.
  - Tests did not involve any third party.
  - The tests demonstrate compliance with the WITS PSA Test Specification.
- WITS Verified
  - Tests have been carried out using WITS verified equipment in conjunction with one or more third parties who can provide WITS Verified devices for testing.
  - Verified Outstations have been tested against two verified WITS Master Stations
  - Verified WITS Master Stations have been tested against three WITS verified field devices
  - Testing has confirmed compliance with the WITS PSA Test Specification.
