= DeWitt notation =

Notation used in quantum field theory

Physics often deals with classical models where the dynamical variables are a collection of functions {φ^{α}}_{α} over a d-dimensional space/spacetime manifold M where α is the "flavor" index. This involves functionals over the φ's, functional derivatives, functional integrals, etc. From a functional point of view this is equivalent to working with an infinite-dimensional smooth manifold where its points are an assignment of a function for each α, and the procedure is in analogy with differential geometry where the coordinates for a point x of the manifold M are φ^{α}(x).

In the DeWitt notation (named after theoretical physicist Bryce DeWitt), φ^{α}(x) is written as φ^{i} where i is now understood as an index covering both α and x.

So, given a smooth functional A, A_{,i} stands for the functional derivative

$$A_{,i}[\varphi] \ \stackrel{\mathrm{def}}{=}\ \frac{\delta}{\delta \varphi^\alpha(x)}A[\varphi]$$

as a functional of φ. In other words, a "1-form" field over the infinite dimensional "functional manifold".

In integrals, the Einstein summation convention is used. Alternatively,

$$A^i B_i \ \stackrel{\mathrm{def}}{=}\ \int_M  \sum_\alpha A^\alpha(x) B_\alpha(x) d^dx$$
