= Witz =

Witz may refer to:

== People ==
- Bob Witz (1934–2021), American artist
- Chaim Witz (born 1949), birth name of Gene Simmons, American musician, band member of Kiss
- Dan Witz (born 1957), Brooklyn-based street artist and realist painter
- Emanuel Witz (1717–1797), Swiss painter
- Isaac Witz (1934–2026), Austrian-born Israeli immunologist, cancer researcher and academic
- Konrad Witz, (c. 1400–1445), German painter
- Laurent Witz, filmmaker
- Sergio Witz Rodríguez (born 1962), Mexican poet

== Geography ==
- Saint-Witz, commune in the Val-d'Oise department in Île-de-France in northern France
- Stadion in der Witz, stadium in Mainz-Kastel, Wiesbaden, Germany

== Other uses ==
- Witz (novel), novel by Joshua Cohen
- Kwik Witz, syndicated comedy program
- Witz (וויץ) is Yiddish and German for "joke"
- WITZ (AM), a radio station (990 AM) licensed to Jasper, Indiana, United States
- WITZ-FM, a radio station (104.7 FM) licensed to Jasper, Indiana, United States
- Wake Island Time Zone, a time zone (UTC+12) in the U.S. territory of Wake Island
