= De Witte (disambiguation) =

De Witte is a Dutch and Flemish surname.

De Witte may also refer to:

- De Witte (novel), a celebrated 1920 novel by Ernest Claes
- De Witte (film), a 1934 Belgian film based upon the novel
- Whitey (film) (AKA De Witte van Sichem), a 1980 Belgian film based on the novel
- De Witte (restaurant), a former Dutch restaurant with a Michelin star
