= DeWitt Township, DeWitt County, Illinois =

DeWitt Township
- Township
- Location in DeWitt County

- DeWitt County's location in Illinois
- Coordinates: 40°11′02″N 88°44′52″W
- Country: United States
- State: Illinois
- County: DeWitt
- Established: November 2, 1858

Area
  - Total: 34.01 sq mi (88.1 km^{2})
  - Land: 31.77 sq mi (82.3 km^{2})
  - Water: 2.24 sq mi (5.8 km^{2}) 6.59%
- Elevation: 732 ft (223 m)

Population (2020)
  - Total: 428
  - Density: 13.5/sq mi (5.20/km^{2})
- Time zone: UTC-6 (CST)
  - Summer (DST): UTC-5 (CDT)
- ZIP codes: 61735, 61842, 61882
- FIPS code: 17-039-19785
- GNIS feature ID: 428894

DeWitt Township is one of thirteen townships in DeWitt County, Illinois, USA. As of the 2020 census, its population was 428 and it contained 207 housing units. It was renamed from its original name of Marion Township on June 7, 1859.

== Geography ==
According to the 2021 census gazetteer files, De Witt Township has a total area of 34.01 square miles (88.09 km^{2}), of which 31.77 square miles (82.28 km^{2}) (or 93.41%) is land and 2.24 square miles (5.80 km^{2}) (or 6.59%) is water.

=== Cities, towns, villages ===
- DeWitt

=== Unincorporated towns ===
- Fullerton at 40.210313°N 88.744516°W

(This list is based on USGS data and may include former settlements.)

=== Cemeteries ===
The township contains these three cemeteries: Barnes, DeWitt and McCord.

== Demographics ==
As of the 2020 census there were 428 people, 168 households, and 128 families residing in the township. The population density was 12.58 inhabitants per square mile (4.86/km^{2}). There were 207 housing units at an average density of 6.09 per square mile (2.35/km^{2}). The racial makeup of the township was 96.03% White, 0.47% African American, 0.00% Native American, 0.23% Asian, 0.00% Pacific Islander, 0.23% from other races, and 3.04% from two or more races. Hispanic or Latino of any race were 2.34% of the population.

There were 168 households, out of which 28.00% had children under the age of 18 living with them, 70.24% were married couples living together, 1.79% had a female householder with no spouse present, and 23.81% were non-families. 18.50% of all households were made up of individuals, and 7.70% had someone living alone who was 65 years of age or older. The average household size was 2.61 and the average family size was 2.96.

The township's age distribution consisted of 21.7% under the age of 18, 0.0% from 18 to 24, 19% from 25 to 44, 48.4% from 45 to 64, and 11.0% who were 65 years of age or older. The median age was 50.1 years. For every 100 females, there were 81.0 males. For every 100 females age 18 and over, there were 91.6 males.

The median income for a household in the township was $93,000, and the median income for a family was $94,000. Males had a median income of $80,104 versus $32,457 for females. The per capita income for the township was $45,864. About 6.3% of families and 8.7% of the population were below the poverty line, including 14.7% of those under age 18 and 6.3% of those age 65 or over.

Historical population
Census	Pop.	Note	%±
1930	840		—
1940	759		−9.6%
1950	665		−12.4%
1960	644		−3.2%
1970	461		−28.4%
1980	469		1.7%
1990	417		−11.1%
2000	475		13.9%
2010	479		0.8%
2020	428		−10.6%

== School districts ==
- Blue Ridge Community Unit School District 18
- Clinton Community Unit School District 15
- DeLand-Weldon Community Unit School District 57

== Political districts ==
- Illinois's 15th congressional district
- State House District 110
- State House District 87
- State Senate District 44
- State Senate District 55
